= Christopher Pike (Star Trek) =

Character in the Star Trek franchise

- Star Trek character
- Anson Mount as Christopher Pike in "Brother", episode of Star Trek: Discovery season 2
- First appearance: Jeffrey Hunter: "The Cage" (1964); "The Menagerie" (1966); (The Original Series); Bruce Greenwood: Star Trek (2009); Anson Mount: "Brother" (2019); (Discovery)
- Last appearance: Bruce Greenwood: Star Trek Into Darkness (2013); Anson Mount: Star Trek: Strange New Worlds (2022–present)
- Created by: Gene Roddenberry
- Portrayed by: Jeffrey Hunter (1964); Sean Kenney (1966); Bruce Greenwood (2009–2013); Anson Mount (2019–present)

In-universe information
- Species: Human
- Gender: Male
- Titles: Captain; Fleet Captain; Admiral (Alternate Universe)
- Affiliation: United Federation of Planets; Starfleet
- Significant others: Vina; Minister Alora; Captain Marie Batel

Christopher Pike is a fictional character in the Star Trek science fiction franchise. He is the immediate predecessor to James T. Kirk as captain of the starship USS Enterprise.

Pike first appeared as the main character of the original unaired pilot episode for Star Trek: The Original Series, "The Cage", portrayed by Jeffrey Hunter. When this pilot was rejected, Hunter withdrew from the series, and the character of Pike was replaced with Kirk. The series later established Pike as being Kirk's predecessor in the two-part story "The Menagerie", which extensively used archive footage from "The Cage"; the framing story included an older, scarred, and disabled Fleet Captain Pike portrayed by Sean Kenney.

The films Star Trek (2009) and Star Trek Into Darkness (2013), which take place in an alternate timeline, feature Bruce Greenwood as a version of Pike who acts as a mentor to the young Kirk. Christopher Pike is a main character in the second season of Star Trek: Discovery (broadcast 2019), portrayed by Anson Mount; set several years after "The Cage", the show has Captain Pike assume temporary command of the USS Discovery. The series Star Trek: Strange New Worlds (2022–present), a spinoff of Discovery, is centered on Pike's time as captain of the USS Enterprise, with Mount reprising the role.

== Biography ==
According to dialogue in "The Cage", he is from the city of Mojave, California, and once owned a horse named Tango.

Pike is the second captain of the USS Enterprise NCC-1701 and the first to be shown in Star Trek canon. Star Trek: The Animated Series reveals that Captain Robert April predated Pike, and printed Star Trek fiction and reference books also identify April as Pike's predecessor. Pike took command of the USS Enterprise in the year 2250, at the age of 38, taking over command from Robert April.

== Appearances ==
=== Television ===
==== Star Trek: The Original Series ====
===== "The Cage" =====
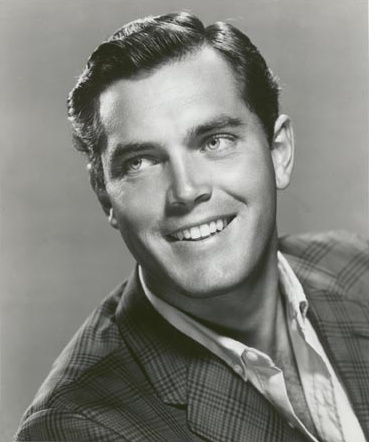
Jeffrey Hunter (pictured in 1960) portrayed the role in the previously unreleased pilot "The Cage", whose scenes were reused for "The Menagerie".

At the beginning of "The Cage", set in the year 2254, Pike and his crew are recuperating from a mission to Rigel VII during which several members of the landing party were killed by the inhabitants. The incident filled Pike with so much guilt that he is considering resigning his commission.

Meanwhile, the Enterprise is en route to Vega Colony to drop off wounded crew members when it receives a distress call from the survey vessel SS Columbia, lost eighteen years previously. Pike initially refuses to investigate, citing that the injured crew members take priority. However, when an abbreviated follow-up message is received, he orders the ship diverted to Talos IV to rescue survivors.

Pike soon learns that all but one of the survivors are illusions created by the Talosians in order to lure the Enterprise crew to Talos IV. The Talosians make every effort to provide fantasies that they hope will appeal to Pike, using Vina, the only real Columbia survivor, as the object of desire. After Pike escapes from his prison cell with the aid of his first officer, Number One, and Yeoman J. M. Colt, the Talosians reveal, to Pike, Vina's real appearance as a disfigured older woman. The Talosians saved her life after the Columbia crashed, but they had no guide on how to repair a human body. Pike requests that the Talosians restore her illusion of beauty and the Enterprise leaves Talos IV.

===== "The Menagerie" =====
At some point prior to the two-part episode "The Menagerie", set in the year 2266, Pike is promoted to fleet captain. He is severely injured while rescuing several cadets from a baffle plate rupture on board a J-class training vessel, the delta ray radiation leaving him paralyzed, unable to speak, badly scarred, and using a brainwave-operated wheelchair for mobility. His only means of communicating is through a light on the chair: one flash meaning "yes" and two flashes indicating "no".

In "The Menagerie", the Enterprise, now under the command of Captain James T. Kirk, travels to Starbase 11. Spock, who had served with Pike for "eleven years, four months, and five days", makes clandestine arrangements to take Pike back to Talos IV, despite travel to Talos IV being the only criminal offense still punishable by death in Starfleet. Spock undergoes court-martial, with his evidence presented during the trial being footage from "The Cage". At the two-part episode's conclusion, it is revealed that the entire procedure was a Talosian-generated illusion to ensure that the Enterprise reached Talos. The Talosians invite Captain Pike to spend the remainder of his life among them, "unfettered by his natural body", which was the entire purpose of Spock's actions. Pike accepts the offer and Spock, now cleared of all charges, sees him off. The Talosians then show Captain Kirk an image of Pike in perfect health and reunited with Vina (another scene from "The Cage").

==== Star Trek: Discovery ====
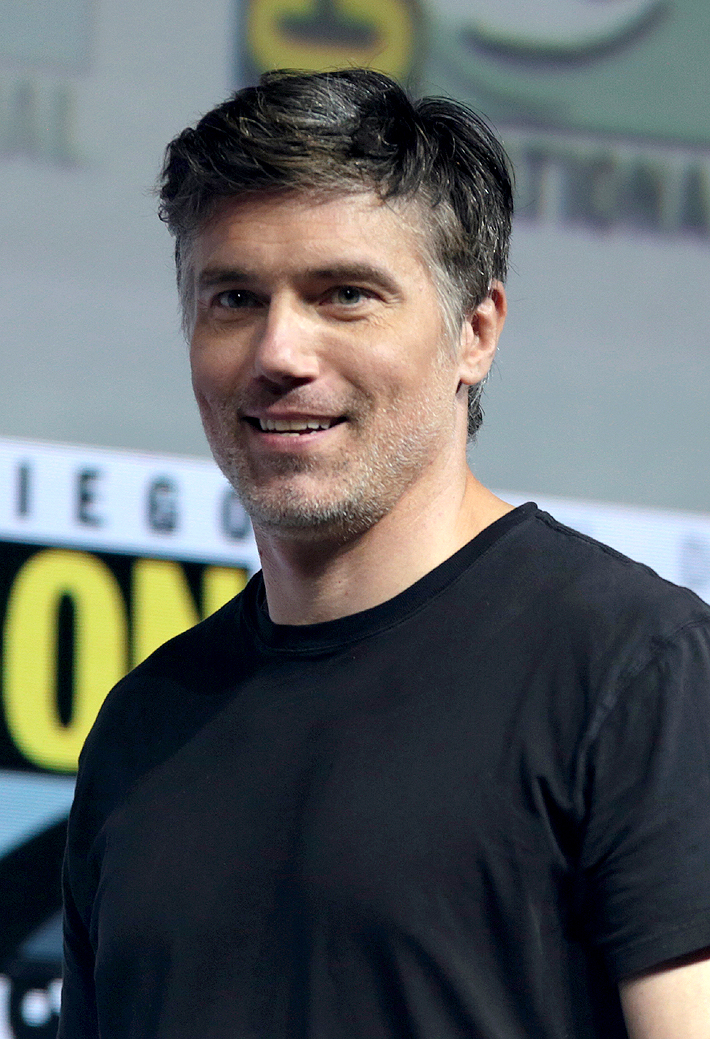
Anson Mount at the 2018 San Diego Comic-Con panel for Discovery

Prior to appearing on Star Trek: Discovery as a main character, Pike is referenced twice in the show's first season. The episode "Choose Your Pain" has Pike listed on the Starfleet Database as one of Starfleet's most decorated Captains as of 2256. (Also included in the list are Jonathan Archer, Matt Decker, Philippa Georgiou and Robert April.) The season finale "Will You Take My Hand?" shows the Enterprise on-screen, with Pike sending a distress call to the Discovery. Anson Mount being cast as Captain Pike for the second season was announced on April 9, 2018.

Captain Christopher Pike was introduced to Star Trek: Discovery in the second-season premiere, "Brother", which first aired in the U.S. on January 17, 2019. Set in the years 2257–2258, the season-long story arc involves Pike assuming temporary command of the USS Discovery while the Enterprise is disabled, in order to investigate the mysterious "red signals" – temporal anomalies appearing throughout space that have some connection to the apparent breakdown and disappearance of Spock. The planet Talos IV reappears in the episode "If Memory Serves", which also has Pike and Vina once again making mental contact. In the episode "Through the Valley of Shadows", Pike receives a premonition of his own future including his injury and disfigurement. He is forced to choose between taking a time crystal from Boreth which would solve the red signal crisis at the cost of his disability in the future or risking the fate of the galaxy. He chooses to remain loyal to Starfleet ideals and accept his future injuries. Pike departs the show in the season finale "Such Sweet Sorrow, Part 2", first aired 18 April 2019, which shows him relinquishing command of the USS Discovery to Saru, who solves the crisis by taking the ship 930 years into the future. Pike reunites with Spock and chooses to resume command of the Enterprise, knowing his future but enjoying the present.

==== Star Trek: Short Treks ====
Anson Mount reprised his role as Pike in the first three episodes of the second season of the anthology series Star Trek: Short Treks. originally airing October 5 to November 14, 2019.

==== Star Trek: Strange New Worlds ====
After Anson Mount left Discovery following the second-season finale, fans of the series began calling for him to reprise his role of Christopher Pike in a spin-off set on the USS Enterprise, alongside Rebecca Romijn as Number One and Ethan Peck as Spock. Alex Kurtzman confirmed that development on such a series had begun in January 2020. Production began on the series in February 2021, and the series premiered in May 2022.

In the first season, set in the year 2259, Pike undergoes a crisis of faith concerning his future injuries. He spends much of the season debating and grappling with the forthcoming incident. When he encounters a child who will become one of the cadets he will fail to save, Pike attempts to alter the timeline to save everyone and himself. However, his future self Admiral Pike appears with a time crystal to reveal that averting his fate leads to an alternate timeline where the events of “Balance of Terror” took place with Pike, not Kirk, commanding the Enterprise. Pike's pacifist approach to the Romulan incursion encourages a full-scale Romulan invasion, causing Spock to suffer grievous injuries that would prevent his roles in both the Federation/Klingon peace accords and the reunification of Vulcans and Romulans, and plunge the Federation into a decades-long war with the Romulans. Ultimately, Pike realises that he can do nothing to change his fate.

=== Reboot/Kelvin timeline films ===
==== Star Trek ====
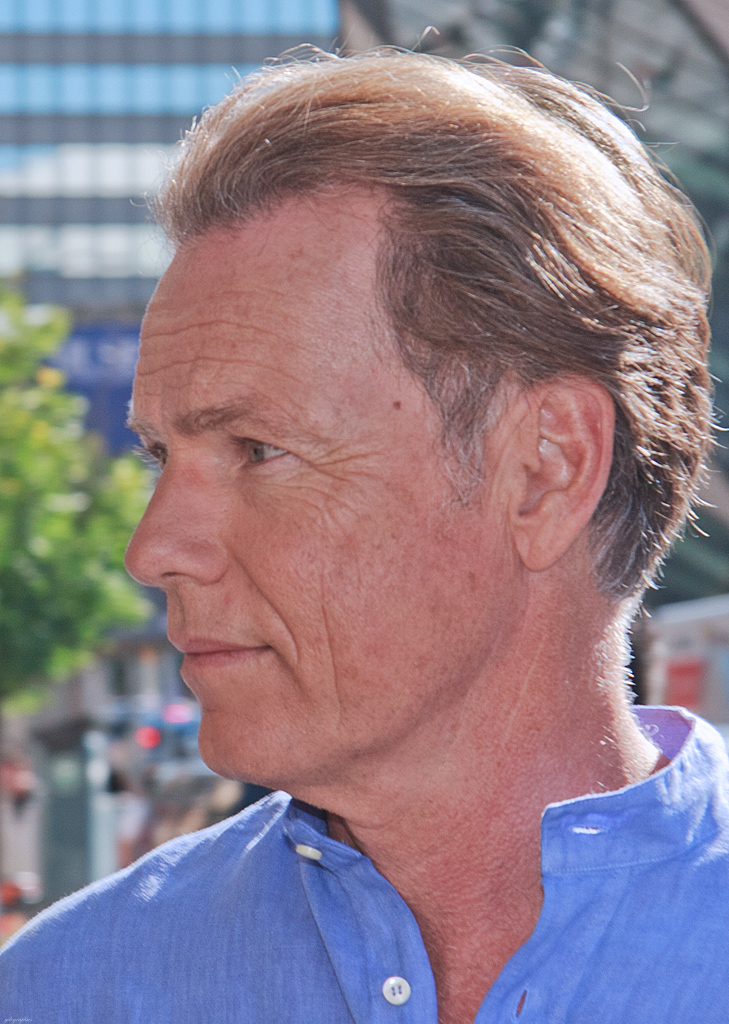
Bruce Greenwood portrays Pike in the 2009 and 2013 films.

Captain Pike appears in the reboot Star Trek (2009), this time portrayed by Bruce Greenwood. In the film, Pike encourages a young, directionless James T. Kirk (Chris Pine) to follow in the footsteps of his hero father and enlist in Starfleet. Pike is the first Captain of the USS Enterprise, with the then deselected, cadet Kirk on board as a stowaway. In the culmination of the Battle of Vulcan, Pike follows an ultimatum of Nero (Eric Bana) to board the enemy ship. Pike leaves Spock in command of the Enterprise with the words: "And I'm not the captain. You are." (Kirk later assumes Spock's role of acting captain.) Pike is tortured for information about Earth's defenses but is later rescued by Kirk, whom Pike also manages to save from an attack despite his wounds. At the end of the film, Pike is promoted to the rank of admiral and uses a wheelchair. Unlike his counterpart in "The Menagerie", however, Pike still retains the ability to speak and to use his upper body. He proudly yields command of the Enterprise to Kirk while he recovers from his injuries, stating that Kirk's father would be proud of his actions.

==== Star Trek Into Darkness ====
Greenwood reprised his role as Pike in the 2013 sequel film, Star Trek Into Darkness. In the film, Pike has partially recovered from the trauma Nero inflicted, using a cane rather than a wheelchair. After Kirk violates the Prime Directive to rescue Spock (Zachary Quinto), Pike briefly retakes command of the Enterprise and warns Kirk that the Admiralty is threatening to put him back into the academy. Pike confronts Kirk about his reckless behavior and how his own actions can get those nearest to him killed. Despite his anger at Kirk, however, Pike retains him as his First Officer, sparing him from having to return to the academy. He later explains to Kirk that he still believes in him and that he also sees a "greatness" behind his recklessness. During a meeting with the Starfleet commanders, including veteran Admiral Marcus and Captain Kirk, Pike is killed in a terrorist attack on Starfleet by John Harrison. Pike's death incites a desire for revenge in Kirk, who seeks to hunt down Harrison, nearly bringing the Federation into a full-scale war with the Klingons. At the end of the film, a memorial service is held for Pike and all of the other people who died as a result of Admiral Marcus and Harrison's actions.

=== Later references ===
Pike is referenced in the original series episode "Mirror, Mirror". An alternate-universe version of Captain Kirk reportedly assassinated Pike to become captain of the ISS Enterprise (the Mirror Universe version of the USS Enterprise).

In the Star Trek: The Next Generation episode "The Most Toys", the name "Pike" can be seen briefly on the side of the shuttlecraft Lt. Commander Data was going to pilot at the beginning of the episode.

A citation named for Pike is revealed in the Star Trek: Deep Space Nine episode "Tears of the Prophets"; Captain Benjamin Sisko receives the "Christopher Pike Medal of Valor" for his actions during the Dominion War. Captain Sisko and his Vulcan rival Captain Solok congratulate each other on receiving "Christopher Pike Medals" in the Deep Space Nine episode "Take Me Out to the Holosuite" (S07E04).

=== Licensed media ===
==== Novels and short stories ====
Pike appears in the Pocket Books novels Enterprise: The First Adventure (Vonda N. McIntyre, 1986), Final Frontier (Diane Carey, 1988), Vulcan's Glory (D. C. Fontana, 1989), The Rift (Peter David, 1991), Burning Dreams (Margaret Wander Bonanno, 2006) and Child of Two Worlds (Greg Cox, 2015).

A mirror-universe version of Pike (established in "Mirror, Mirror", as having been assassinated by the mirror James T. Kirk.)

He also appears in the novel Dark Victory (William Shatner, 1999), and the short story "The Greater Good" (Margaret Wander Bonanno) in the anthology Star Trek: Mirror Universe: Shards and Shadows (2009).

Dave Stern's 2010 original series novel The Children of Kings was set aboard Pike's Enterprise.

Captain Pike has his own novel in "Captain's Table" series, Where Sea Meets Sky, written by Jerry Oltion and published in October 1998.

Captain Pike and the Enterprise appear in the first Star Trek: Discovery novel Desperate Hours (David Mack, 2017) and feature prominently in the fifth novel The Enterprise War (John Jackson Miller, 2019), which chronicles the Enterprise's activities concurrent with the first season of that series.

==== Comics ====
Star Trek: Early Voyages

In the Paramount-licensed Star Trek comic book series published by Marvel Comics, Star Trek: Early Voyages chronicled the adventures of the Enterprise under the command of Pike. The earliest issues lead up to the events seen in "The Cage", which was retold from Yeoman Colt's point of view. Although extremely popular, the comic series ended on a cliffhanger when Marvel lost the Star Trek license rights.

Star Trek Annual #2 – "The Final Voyage" (DC comics, 1986)

In this issue, the Enterprise tries to return home to Earth only to find itself around Talos IV. They discover that the Klingons have gone to the planet reasoning anything that scared the Federation enough to maintain the death penalty could be used as a weapon. While on the surface they also discover two Klingons torturing Pike, who is back in his chair due to the Klingons having partially mastered the Talosian's mind powers. One of the Klingons then tortures the crew of the Enterprise by making them live their worst fears. Kirk, forced to relive the death of Edith Keeler, goes berserk with rage and breaks the illusion. Kirk then beats the Klingon tormenting them to death with his bare hands. The crew quickly free the Talosians, who mentally imprison the Klingons in illusions of peaceful, tranquil settings as they purge their memories of Talos IV. The crew returns home with Pike remaining on Talos IV to continue his illusionary life.

Starfleet Academy comic series

In the Paramount-licensed Star Trek comic book series published by Marvel Comics, Starfleet Academy, Nog and some fellow cadets encounter a solid image of Pike on Talos IV.

Star Trek Captain's Log: Pike (IDW Publishing, 2010)

Captain's Log: Pike published by IDW details the events leading up to and including Pike becoming disabled from the baffle plate rupture aboard the USS Exeter (NCC-1788) under the watch of Captain Colt, Pike's former yeoman on the Enterprise. The story also reveals Colt's unrequited love for her former Captain.

=== In popular culture ===
In an episode of the non-canon fan film series Star Trek: New Voyages, a time-traveling Kirk and Spock attempt to warn Pike not to attempt to rescue the trapped cadets. Pike attempts it, in spite of what future-Kirk and future-Spock say, causing him to be injured by the delta rays and subsequently transition to a life in the wheelchair and its light communication device.

== Reception ==
In 2012, IGN ranked the character Christoper Pike, as depicted in the original series and the 2009 film Star Trek, as the 23rd best character of the Star Trek universe.

In 2017, The Washington Post ranked Pike as the sixth best captain of Star Trek, including the character's presentations in the Kelvin films (Bruce Greenwood) and the Star Trek pilot and original series (Jeffrey Hunter and Sean Kenney).

In 2019, TV Guide called Captain Pike (played by Anson Mount) featured in Star Trek: Discovery a "fan favorite", also noting Pike's Number One (played by Rebecca Romijn).

In 2019, due to his inclusion in Star Trek: Discovery's second season, Screen Rant ranked Anson Mount's Pike as the second best captain in Star Trek:

This guy saw his future as a disfigured hunk of meat on a wheelchair, and yet he still pressed on. That's what we call bravery.
