= Star Trek: Discovery season 2 =

Star Trek: Discovery
- Season 2
- Promotional poster
- Showrunner: Alex Kurtzman
- Starring: Sonequa Martin-Green; Doug Jones; Anthony Rapp; Mary Wiseman; Shazad Latif; Wilson Cruz; Anson Mount
- No. of episodes: 14

Release
- Original network: CBS All Access
- Original release: January 17 – April 18, 2019

Season chronology
- ← Previous; Season 1 Next → Season 3

The second season of the American television series Star Trek: Discovery is set a decade before Star Trek: The Original Series in the 23rd century and follows the crew of the starship Discovery. With the crew of the USS Enterprise they investigate seven signals that were sent by a time traveler to prevent a rogue artificial intelligence from destroying all sentient life. The season was produced by CBS Television Studios in association with Secret Hideout and Roddenberry Entertainment, with Alex Kurtzman serving as showrunner.

Sonequa Martin-Green stars as Michael Burnham, first officer of the Discovery, along with the returning Doug Jones, Anthony Rapp, Mary Wiseman, and Shazad Latif. They are joined by former recurring guest star Wilson Cruz, and by Anson Mount as Captain Christopher Pike of the Enterprise. The season was officially ordered in October 2017, and introduced the Enterprise and its crew—including recurring guest star Ethan Peck as Spock and guest star Rebecca Romijn as Number One—to help align the series to the larger Star Trek franchise, as those characters originated on The Original Series. Designs for the Enterprise and its uniforms were updated to match Discovery's more modern style. Filming took place in Toronto, Canada, from April to December 2018. Co-creator Kurtzman chose to use anamorphic lenses on the season to make it more cinematic, and he took over as showrunner from the first season's Gretchen J. Berg and Aaron Harberts after they were fired during production. The season connects to the companion shorts series Star Trek: Short Treks.

The 14-episode season was released from January 17 to April 18, 2019, on the streaming service CBS All Access. Many critics found it to be an improvement on the first season, praising its lighter tone, cast (especially Mount and guest star Tig Notaro), and high production value. The season's attempts to align with existing Star Trek continuity received mixed reviews. It won a Primetime Creative Arts Emmy Award for its prosthetic makeup, and received several other awards and nominations. A third season was ordered in February 2019, and after a spin-off series starring Mount, Peck, and Romijn was called for by fans and critics alike, CBS All Access ordered Star Trek: Strange New Worlds in May 2020.

== Episodes ==
No. overall	No. in season	Title	Directed by	Written by	Original release date
16	1	"Brother"	Alex Kurtzman	Ted Sullivan & Gretchen J. Berg & Aaron Harberts	January 17, 2019
En route to Vulcan to pick up its new captain after Gabriel Lorca betrayed the crew during the Federation–Klingon War, the USS Discovery receives a distress call from the USS Enterprise. Captain Christopher Pike takes emergency command, explaining that the Enterprise suffered catastrophic damage while investigating seven mysterious signals scattered across the galaxy. Six signals have since disappeared, and when Discovery arrives at the seventh location, it also disappears. There, the crew discovers the wreckage of the USS Hiawatha, which had been believed lost during the war, on an asteroid composed of non-baryonic matter. Inside they find chief engineer Jett Reno nursing the last survivors. While helping them off the asteroid, commander Michael Burnham sees what she describes as a "red angel." Burnham visits the Enterprise to search the quarters of her foster brother Spock, who Pike reveals is on a leave of absence from Starfleet. She discovers a file from Spock's log that describes nightmares of the seven signals and red angel he has had since childhood.
17	2	"New Eden"	Jonathan Frakes	Story by : Akiva Goldsman & Sean Cochran; Teleplay by : Vaun Wilmott & Sean Cochran	January 24, 2019
Confronted with the log entry, Pike reveals Spock committed himself to a psychiatric unit one week after taking leave and requested Starfleet inform neither Burnham nor their parents. Discovery detects another signal and uses its experimental spore drive to travel to it, finding a planet with a previously unknown human population. A looped transmission suggests the population departed Earth during World War III. Pike and Burnham lead an away team to the surface, finding a primitive society with a religion combining multiple faiths. As the investigation continues, an anomaly produces an extinction-level radiation shower. Ensign Sylvia Tilly, acting on a fellow ensign's advice, uses a sample from the asteroid's non-baryonic matter to avert the catastrophe. Tilly later recognizes the ensign as May Ahearn, a high school classmate who died five years earlier. Pike reviews footage from a helmet camera belonging to a founding member of the society, which shows the Red Angel bringing the population to Terralysium from Earth.
18	3	"Point of Light"	Olatunde Osunsanmi	Andrew Colville	January 31, 2019
Amanda Grayson, Spock's mother and Burnham's adoptive mother, learns that Spock has escaped the psychiatric unit and is wanted for murdering three doctors. She steals his medical records and takes them to Discovery for decryption. Grayson recognizes a drawing in the records from Spock's childhood art: the Red Angel. Burnham admits to emotionally hurting Spock when they were young to protect him from Vulcan's logic extremists. On Qo'noS, Klingon house leader Kol-Sha threatens to kill Starfleet Officer Ash Tyler—formerly the Klingon Voq—and the Klingon Empire's leader L'Rell for having a secret child together. The pair kill Kol-Sha with the help of Philippa Georgiou, the former Empress of the Mirror Universe's Terran Empire, who is now an agent of Starfleet's secretive Section 31. In a ruse to consolidate power, L'Rell convinces the Klingon High Council that Tyler and the baby are dead. Georgiou delivers the baby to a Klingon monastery and recruits Tyler to Section 31. Burnham and Engineer Paul Stamets use dark matter to remove a parasite from Tilly that caused her hallucination of May.
19	4	"An Obol for Charon"	Lee Rose	Story by : Jordon Nardino & Gretchen J. Berg & Aaron Harberts; Teleplay by : Alan McElroy & Andrew Colville	February 7, 2019
A living, intelligent, planetoid-sized Sphere pulls Discovery out of warp and immobilizes it. The crew surmises that the Sphere is well-intentioned and has gathered huge amounts of data from all over the galaxy that it does not want to be lost before it dies. However, the Sphere's hold on Discovery triggers the Vahar'ai in Commander Saru, a fatal condition to his species, the Kelpiens. The Sphere transmits its information to the crew and dies, releasing Discovery so that it will not be caught in the ensuing explosion. Saru asks Burnham to euthanize him by removing his threat ganglia, which sense danger. However, they fall out on their own and leave Saru healthy and living without the overwhelming fear his species is known for. Meanwhile, the parasite attaches itself to Tilly again, once again accessing her memories to communicate as a hallucination of May. The parasite claims Discovery has nearly destroyed its ecosystem by using its species' mycelial network to jump through space with the spore drive. It then consumes Tilly, leaving no trace of her.
20	5	"Saints of Imperfection"	David Barrett	Kirsten Beyer	February 14, 2019
Stamets and Burnham conclude that Tilly has been taken into the mycelial network. She wakes up there with the May parasite, who wants her to help stop a "monster" ravaging their world. Discovery finds the shuttle Spock used to escape the psychiatric unit only to discover Georgiou onboard. Section 31 Captain Leland assigns Tyler to Discovery as a liaison to ensure that Discovery does not interfere with Section 31's own investigation into Spock. Discovery conducts a half-jump into the mycelial network to give Stamets and Burnham limited time to find Tilly before the network consumes the ship. Burnham and Stamets discover the monster is Stamets' husband, Hugh Culber, the former Discovery Medical Officer who Tyler murdered during the war. Stamets was connected to the network when Culber died, allowing Culber's energy to be recreated by the spores. Burnham now convinces May to use the parasite cocoon on Discovery, through which Tilly was transported into the network, to rebuild Culber's body in normal space. They leave the network with Culber and Tilly.
21	6	"The Sound of Thunder"	Douglas Aarniokoski	Bo Yeon Kim & Erika Lippoldt	February 21, 2019
Another of the mysterious signals leads Discovery to Saru's homeworld of Kaminar, where the fearful Kelpiens are preyed upon by predators called the Ba'ul who demand that Pike surrender Saru to them since Starfleet has agreed to stay out of the conflict between the two species. Pike refuses, but Saru turns himself over to prevent a fight. Tilly works with technologically-augmented Lieutenant Commander Airiam to sift through the Sphere's information on Kaminar: they learn that the fearless, post Vahar'ai Kelpiens were once Kaminar's dominant species and nearly eradicated the Ba'ul. The latter were only able to survive by using their superior technology to cull Kelpiens before they lose their threat ganglia and become fearless. Pike uses the Ba'ul's technology to trigger Vahar'ai in all Kelpiens, hoping the two species can instead work towards a peaceful solution once the Kelpiens are freed. The Ba'ul retaliate against Starfleet's actions by attempting genocide on the Kelpiens, but are stopped by the Red Angel, whom Saru sees is a humanoid wearing a highly-advanced suit.
22	7	"Light and Shadows"	Marta Cunningham	Story by : Ted Sullivan & Vaun Wilmott; Teleplay by : Ted Sullivan	February 28, 2019
Discovery is confronted by a time anomaly while researching the Red Angel's signal over Kaminar. Pike and Tyler investigate the anomaly in a shuttlecraft, sending a probe into it. That same probe soon returns through the anomaly having been upgraded with future technology. It attacks the shuttle, and secretly infects Airiam's augmentations using the shuttle's computer system. Pike and Tyler destroy the probe with Stamets' help, as his exposure to the mycelial network allows him to ignore the time discrepancies in the anomaly. Meanwhile, Burnham visits Vulcan as she continues to search for Spock. Confronting Grayson, Burnham learns that their mother has been hiding Spock, who is in psychological distress and is repeating phrases and a series of numbers. Their father Sarek instructs Burnham to trust Starfleet and take Spock to Section 31 to fix his mind. Section 31's doctors claim that they can help him, but Georgiou warns her that Spock will not survive the memory extractor that Section 31 plans to use on him. Georgiou helps Burnham stage an attack that allows Burnham and Spock to escape the ship.
23	8	"If Memory Serves"	T. J. Scott	Dan Dworkin & Jay Beattie	March 7, 2019
Previously, the Enterprise visited the planet Talos IV where Pike and Spock met the Talosians, beings that can create incredible illusions. Pike fell in love with Vina, an injured Federation crewman in the Talosians' care, but she was unable to leave the planet due to the Talosians' abilities keeping her alive. Pike chose to return to the Enterprise, and Starfleet banned future visits to Talos IV. (Note: These events occurred in "The Cage", the first pilot for Star Trek: The Original Series. Footage from "The Cage" is used in a recap that plays at the start of "If Memory Serves".) In the present, Burnham and Spock secretly travel to Talos IV, where the Talosians heal Spock's mind in exchange for Burnham's memories of emotionally scarring Spock which they are interested in observing. Spock reveals that he mind-melded with the Red Angel, a time traveller trying to avert a galactic catastrophe in the future. Stamets attempts to reconnect with Culber, who is going through an identity crisis since his resurrection. Culber confronts Tyler, but realizes that the latter is going through a similar crisis. Discovery collects Spock and Burnham, and they escape while Section 31 is distracted by illusions created by the Talosians.
24	9	"Project Daedalus"	Jonathan Frakes	Michelle Paradise	March 14, 2019
Starfleet Admiral Katrina Cornwell secretly boards Discovery to interrogate Spock and brings video footage depicting Spock murdering the three doctors. Saru discovers that Section 31 faked the footage using holograms, and Cornwell directs Discovery to Section 31 headquarters where Starfleet's Control artificial intelligence is kept. Control is behind the forgery and has been directing Section 31 to pursue Spock. Burnham, Security Officer Nhan, and Airiam beam into the headquarters to find the personnel, including Section 31's leadership, dead after Control turned off life-support systems. Airiam is tasked with restoring Control to Starfleet's intended purpose, but the virus from the future she carries is actually Control itself and instead attempts to upload the Sphere's knowledge of all artificial intelligence into Control's database. Airiam asks to be ejected into space before Control gains the knowledge it wishes; Burnham hesitates, but Commander Nhan jettisons Airiam before it is too late. Airiam dies reliving her favorite memory from before she was technologically-augmented.
25	10	"The Red Angel"	Hanelle M. Culpepper	Chris Silvestri & Anthony Maranville	March 21, 2019
While preparing for Airiam's funeral, her system is purged of the Control virus along with all other Control systems around Starfleet. While doing this, Tilly discovers a bio-neural scan of the Red Angel in Airiam's code that matches Burnham. Leland reveals that Section 31 built the Red Angel time travel suit twenty years ago in a temporal-arms race with the Klingons and that Burnham's biological parents had been part of that program. Leland's carelessness at the time led to their deaths. The crew now plan to use Burnham as bait for the Red Angel. Discovery travels to Essof IV, where there is enough energy to power their trap. Burnham is left out in the planet's unbreathable atmosphere until the Red Angel appears. Leland's Section 31 ship can close the wormhole behind the Red Angel to stop the future version of Control from following her through, though Leland is attacked by the present-day version of Control which is still active within his ship. The Red Angel is caught in the trap and revives the momentarily dead Burnham, who recognizes the figure as her mother.
26	11	"Perpetual Infinity"	Maja Vrvilo	Alan McElroy & Brandon Schultz	March 28, 2019
When the Burnhams' laboratory was attacked by Klingons years ago, Michael's mother donned the experimental time travel suit to go back in time an hour and warn them of the coming attack. She instead arrived 950 years in the future to find all sentient life destroyed by Control. Tethering herself to a nearby planet, Dr. Burnham made over 840 attempts to change the future, including moving humans to her new planet, Terralysium, to test how she can change history. Trying to stop Control from gaining the Sphere's data, Dr. Burnham was responsible for directing the Sphere to cross paths with the Discovery. Now, the Discovery crew plans to upload the Sphere data into the suit and send it to the future where Control cannot access it while keeping Dr. Burnham in the present, but a Control-possessed Leland intercepts their upload. Georgiou and Tyler confront Leland, with Tyler gravely injured but able to warn Discovery. The crew is forced to cut the transmission short and release Dr. Burnham back to the future, with the suit now damaged. Control-Leland escapes with half of the Sphere data.
27	12	"Through the Valley of Shadows"	Douglas Aarniokoski	Bo Yeon Kim & Erika Lippoldt	April 4, 2019
A new signal appears over Boreth, a planet which is sacred to Klingons and has a monastery where Klingon monks guard time crystals. These are the same monks that Tyler and L'Rell left their son to be raised by. Pike visits the monastery to retrieve a time crystal and finds that their son is now a fully grown adult named Tenavik. Tenavik explains that life on Boreth is affected by the crystals and that if Pike takes one, he will not be able to change the future that it shows him. Pike sees a future where he is severely disabled in an accident but chooses to take the crystal anyway to serve the greater good. Meanwhile, Burnham and Spock investigate a Section 31 ship that had checked in ten minutes later than usual and find all of the crew dead except for one, Kamran Gant, an old colleague of Burnham's who has been possessed by Control and attempts to transfer Control into Burnham's body. Spock is able to stop Control with magnetism, and they escape back to Discovery. The Section 31 fleet soon arrives, forcing Pike to order Discovery be destroyed to keep the Sphere data away from Control.
28	13	"Such Sweet Sorrow"	Olatunde Osunsanmi	Michelle Paradise & Jenny Lumet & Alex Kurtzman	April 11, 2019
29	14	"Such Sweet Sorrow"	Olatunde Osunsanmi	Michelle Paradise & Jenny Lumet & Alex Kurtzman	April 18, 2019
Part 1: Discovery escapes to rendezvous with the Enterprise. The Discovery crew is evacuated onto the other starship, and they initiate the Discovery's self-destruct sequence, but the Sphere data takes control of Discovery's systems and prevents this from happening. It also defends itself from torpedoes. Burnham proposes that the time crystal be used to take Discovery itself to the future where Control cannot get to it, and plans to wear a copy of her mother's suit to lead the ship there. Pike agrees and resumes command of the Enterprise to keep Control distracted. A new signal appears, leading Discovery and Enterprise to the planet Xahea which is ruled by Tilly's friend Queen Me Hani Ika Hali Ka Po. A brilliant engineer, Po helps Stamets, Tilly, and Reno prepare the suit and time crystal for the journey. Some of the Discovery's crew choose to stay with Burnham, as does Georgiou, while Pike makes Saru acting captain. As the Section 31 fleet arrives, Discovery and Enterprise prepare for battle while the suit and time crystal are finalized. Part 2: Tyler retrieves the Klingon fleet to assist in the battle, while Saru's sister Siranna arrives with Ba'ul fighters after receiving a farewell message from Saru. Stamets is seriously injured and is cared for by Culber. A Section 31 torpedo penetrates the Enterprise without detonating, and Cornwell seals off the surrounding area which prevents further damage when a secondary detonation kills her. Control-Leland boards Discovery and is defeated when Georgiou magnetizes the nanites in his body, allowing Section 31's fleet to be destroyed. In the suit, Burnham travels to the past and sets the five signals that led them to this point. She then sets a sixth for Discovery to follow as she travels forward over 900 years, and promises to set a seventh when they arrive. The Enterprise crew tells Starfleet that Discovery was destroyed in the battle and are ordered to never speak of it or the crew again (on Spock's recommendation, to prevent another incident like Control). Tyler is placed in command of Section 31. Months later, the Enterprise detects the seventh signal as it begins a new adventure.

== Cast and characters ==
=== Main ===
- Sonequa Martin-Green as Michael Burnham
- Doug Jones as Saru
- Anthony Rapp as Paul Stamets
- Mary Wiseman as Sylvia Tilly
- Shazad Latif as Voq / Ash Tyler
- Wilson Cruz as Hugh Culber
- Anson Mount as Christopher Pike

=== Recurring ===
- Mia Kirshner as Amanda Grayson
- Tig Notaro as Jett Reno
- Bahia Watson as May Ahearn
- Michelle Yeoh as Philippa Georgiou
- Alan van Sprang as Leland
- Rachael Ancheril as Nhan
- Jayne Brook as Katrina Cornwell
- Ethan Peck as Spock
- Sonja Sohn as Gabrielle Burnham / Red Angel

=== Notable guests ===
- James Frain as Sarek
- Mary Chieffo as L'Rell
- Kenneth Mitchell as Kol-Sha and Tenavik
- Rebecca Romijn as Number One
- Hannah Spear as Siranna
- Melissa George as Vina
- Rob Brownstien as the Keeper
- Kenric Green as Mike Burnham
- Yadira Guevara-Prip as Me Hani Ika Hali Ka Po

== Production ==
=== Background ===
On November 2, 2015, CBS announced a new Star Trek television series to premiere in January 2017, "on the heels" of Star Trek: The Original Series' 50th anniversary in 2016. In February 2016, Bryan Fuller, who began his career writing for the series Star Trek: Deep Space Nine and Star Trek: Voyager, was announced as the new series' showrunner, and co-creator alongside Alex Kurtzman. CBS did not have a plan for what the new show would be when Fuller joined, and he proposed an anthology series with each season being a standalone, serialized show set in a different era, beginning with a prequel to the original series. CBS told Fuller to just start with a single serialized show and see how that performs first, and he began further developing the prequel concept. By the end of 2016, Fuller had left the series due to conflicts with CBS and other commitments. He had hired Gretchen J. Berg and Aaron Harberts to act as co-showrunners with him, and they took over after his departure. In June 2017, Kurtzman said that he and Fuller had discussed plans for future seasons before the latter's departure.

=== Development ===
In August 2017, before the series premiere, executive producer Akiva Goldsman stated that though the series is not an anthology as Fuller first proposed, "it's kind of a hybridized approach. I don't think we're looking for an endless, continuing nine or 10 year story. We're looking at arcs which will have characters that we know and characters that we don't know." Kurtzman elaborated that the Federation-Klingon War story arc of the first season would not continue in a second. However, he was not interested in a full anthology series because "I wouldn't necessarily want to throw [the characters] away at the end of the season for a new show", and instead felt that the aftereffects of the first season would be felt moving forward: "The results of the war are going to allow for a lot of new storytelling", with "the casualties, the things that have grown in Starfleet as a result of the war" carrying over to the next season. By the end of the month, Berg and Harberts had developed a road map for a second season. After the series premiered, Kurtzman said a "big idea" had been proposed mid-way through production on the first season which became the "spine" of the second, with the writers' "emotional compass" having pointed them to using that idea. He added that the series' producers wanted to avoid announcing release dates for future seasons just to delay them as happened on the first season, but he hoped a second season would be available in early 2019 as long as the quality and scope of the series was not compromised to achieve that.

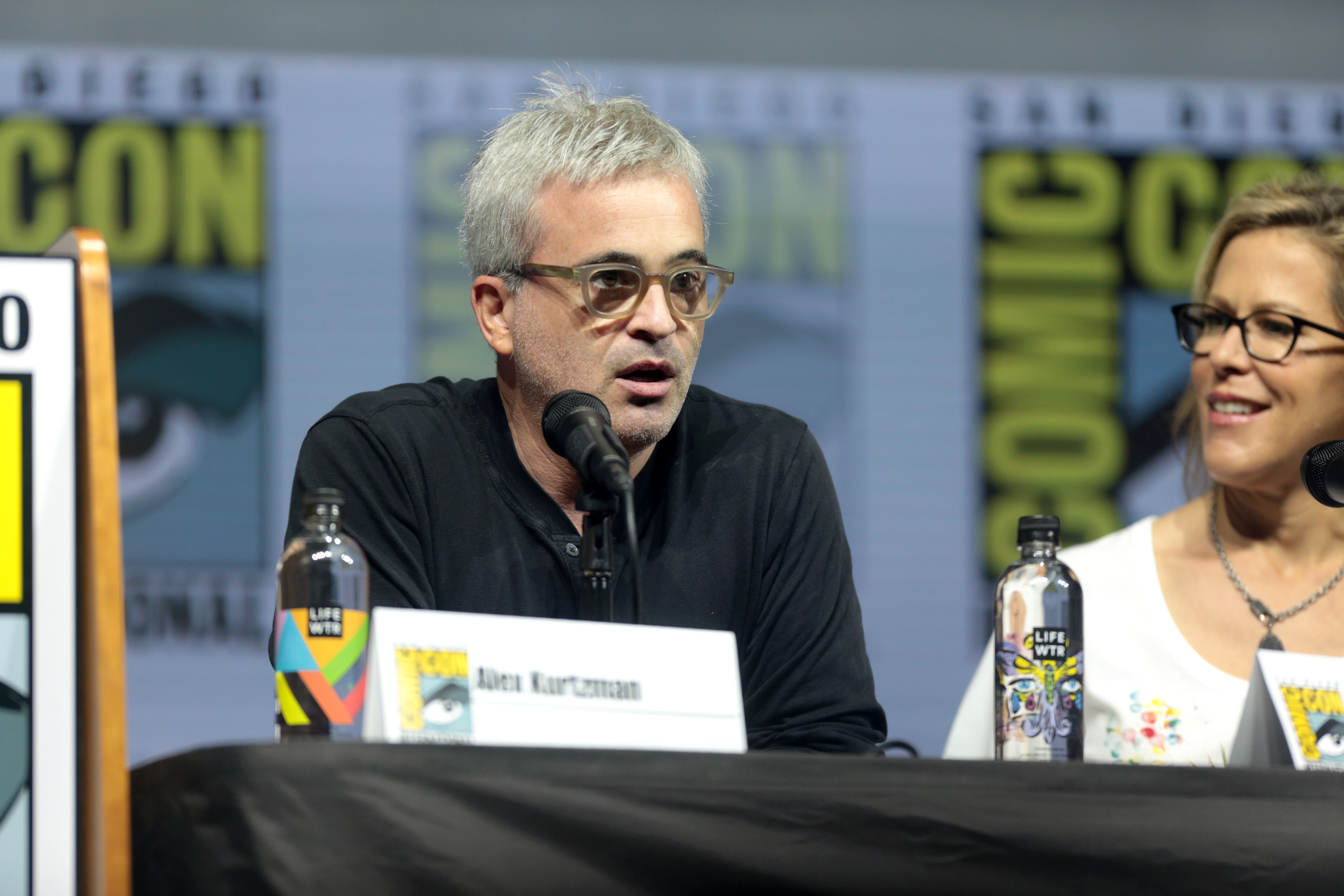
Co-creator Alex Kurtzman became sole showrunner of the series during production of the second season.

On October 23, a 13-episode second season was officially ordered by CBS All Access. CBS Interactive President Marc DeBevoise cited the increased subscriptions for All Access since the series' debut, as well as critical acclaim and fan interest, when announcing the renewal. In June 2018, during production on the season, CBS Television Studios fired Berg and Harberts. The studio and network were pleased with the scripts and early cuts of already filmed episodes, but the first episode had gone significantly over budget—to the point that the budgets for later episodes would have to be reduced—and the pair were allegedly abusive towards the writing staff, with multiple writers becoming uncomfortable working with them. Some had apparently been threatened by Harberts after stating their intention to file a formal complaint. Kurtzman was made sole showrunner in their place, and was described as the "glue holding Discovery together". Kurtzman took over the role because he felt Berg and Harberts had been forced to "pick up the pieces" following Fuller's departure and he did not want to make someone else do that again. Despite not planning to showrun Discovery, Kurtzman felt as co-creator of the series that it was his responsibility to make sure it was working.

With the change in showrunner came news that Goldsman had not returned as executive producer for the second season, after serving as Kurtzman's "right-hand man" on the first, because he had a "management style and personality that clashed with the writing staff". At the end of June, James Duff joined as an executive producer to help Kurtzman run the writers room. Olatunde Osunsanmi, who served as a director and co-executive producer during the first season, became a full executive producer and was set as producing director for the rest of the season. Additionally, Jenny Lumet, who joined as a consulting producer at the beginning of the season, was promoted to co-executive producer. In July 2018, the season was confirmed to premiere in January 2019. Star Anson Mount revealed in December that the season had been extended to 14 episodes to amortize the cost of production delays following the showrunner change.

=== Writing ===
The series' writers began work on the second season in December 2017, and were considering "science vs. faith" as the main theme. Harberts said the season would be "jam packed" with things that they were not able to do in the first. In March 2018, he clarified that the series would not just be looking at religion, but also "patterns in our lives. It means connections you can't explain. Who enters your life and who leaves your life and these indelible impressions people make ... that is one of our biggest ideas now and it is threading through all of our characters' lives." Something that Kurtzman felt the best Star Trek series had was examinations of the real world at the time of their creation, and so this season would address "building walls around ourselves, literally, to keep people out" and how that can "chip away at our essential understanding of Starfleet doctrine, and what it means to assume diversity". Mount felt the season was able to "get back to those big questions" because it was no longer questioning the leadership of the Discovery as was done with Captain Gabriel Lorca in the first season. Kurtzman noted that religion is a controversial topic among Star Trek fans, and the series' study of faith was "never about picking on religion as much as it was about faith in each other and in themselves". He felt that protagonist Michael Burnham wrestles with faith because she was not raised with it, but is rewarded for finding it. He interpreted this as saying, "If you believe in yourself, ultimately, the best outcome presents itself."

Without the first season's Federation–Klingon War storyline, Kurtzman said there would be less focus on the Klingons in the second season and far fewer Klingon-only scenes, but Klingon characters would still appear. He added that the Klingons would grow their hair back to show that they are no longer at war, something he said was always intended and not a response to fan criticisms of the bald Klingons in the first season. The second season has a single serialized story like the first season had, but the writers moved towards a more episodic feel by having a central character or question for each episode. The second season begins where the first season ended, with the arrival of the USS Enterprise. This ties into a larger story that is the main arc for the second season, involving seven mysterious signals and a mysterious "red angel" figure. Harberts wanted to explore the character Christopher Pike, captain of the Enterprise, feeling that he had not been seen much in the franchise. Burnham's adoptive brother Spock is also a crew member of the Enterprise, but Harberts was less interested in exploring him given his many appearances throughout the Star Trek franchise. Harberts was also reluctant to have an actor other than Leonard Nimoy or Zachary Quinto portray the character. However, Spock was confirmed to be included in the season in April 2018, and his relationship with Burnham became the most important part of the season for Kurtzman. The writers wanted to tell a new story with Spock that would show him become closer to the Nimoy and Quinto versions over time, visually signified by having the character shave his beard at the end of the season to look more like them. The season also reveals that it was Burnham's relationship with Spock that allowed him to "fully actualize himself" with James Kirk in the original Star Trek series, which was an important development for Kurtzman to explore when telling this part of Spock's life.

The season finale had to answer all the season's mysteries, complete its character arcs, feature a large battle, and set-up stories for the next season. While planning this, the writers realized that they could not do justice to it all within a single episode's length. It was around this time that CBS added an additional episode to the season's order, which allowed the writers to expand their plans to a two-part season finale. Executive producer Michelle Paradise compared the scope of the finale to a feature film. A goal of the showrunners for the season was to "cement Discovery firmly in the timeline" by reconciling some of the apparent continuity errors from the first season, such as why Burnham has never been mentioned by Spock in the franchise or why Discovery's advanced spore drive technology is not used on other starships in later Star Trek series. The season ends with Discovery and its crew traveling over 900 years into the future, and Spock recommending to Starfleet that the starship and its crew never be mentioned again to prevent the events of the season from being repeated. Kurtzman said this solution was chosen after months of work with the writers, which included considerations of the future of the series; he compared the decision to the film Star Trek (2009) starting a new timeline to avoid established continuity.

=== Casting ===
The season stars the returning Sonequa Martin-Green as Burnham, Doug Jones as Saru, Anthony Rapp as Paul Stamets, Mary Wiseman as Sylvia Tilly, and Shazad Latif as Voq / Ash Tyler. Wilson Cruz reprises his guest role of Hugh Culber, who died in the first season, and is promoted to the main cast for the second.

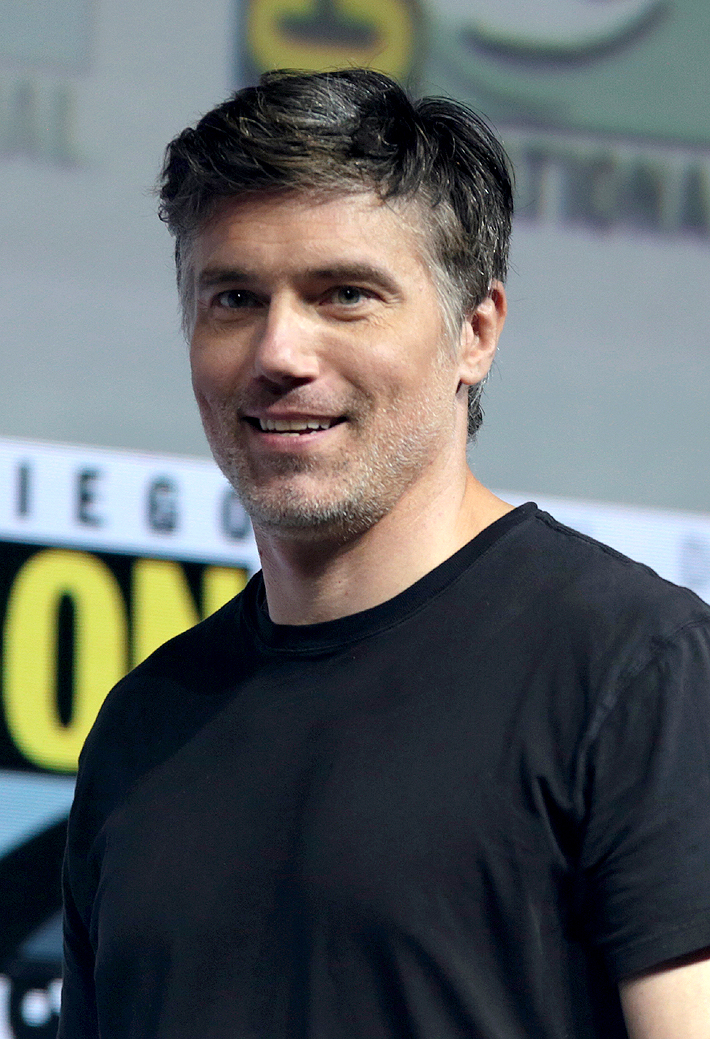
Anson Mount joined the cast of the series for this season, portraying Discovery's temporary captain Christopher Pike, a character from the original Star Trek series.

In April 2018, Anson Mount—who was considered for the role of Lorca in the first season—was cast as Pike, and a young Spock was confirmed to be appearing; Kurtzman noted that casting for Spock took into consideration a balance between Vulcan logic and revealing "emotion in the eyes and in the small gestures". Mount revealed in July that he would star for the full season, and that Rebecca Romijn would portray the original series character Number One. Mount and Romijn both signed one year deals for the series, with their characters included to help closer align the series to the wider Star Trek continuity. In August, Ethan Peck was announced as portraying Spock in the season. Kurtzman compared the actor to both Nimoy and Quinto and stated that he believed Peck "would, like them, effortlessly embody Spock's greatest qualities, beyond obvious logic: empathy, intuition, compassion, confusion, and yearning".

An alternate ending to the first season was revealed in March 2018, introducing a Section 31 agent named Leland who is portrayed by Alan van Sprang. The producers confirmed that Van Sprang would be portraying the character in the second season. Van Sprang had worked with Berg and Harberts on the series Reign, and they had been trying to find a character for him to play throughout production on the first season. The actor said his role was a "massive part" of the second season. The alternate ending saw Leland approach Michelle Yeoh's Philippa Georgiou about joining Section 31, and, in February 2018, Kurtzman said that it was possible for Yeoh to reprise the role in the second season along with Jason Isaacs as Gabriel Lorca. Yeoh was confirmed to be appearing in the season to continue the Section 31 storyline in October 2018, while in January 2019, Kurtzman said Isaacs would not be appearing but could still return in the future.

Tig Notaro was cast in the guest role of Denise Reno in April 2018. She later revealed that this would be a recurring role for the season, and that she had been able to rename her character to Jett Reno. That October, Martin-Green announced that her husband Kenric Green had been cast for the season, and would be making an "indelible contribution". He portrays Burnham's father Mike in a flashback in the episode "Perpetual Infinity", while Sonja Sohn portrays her mother Gabrielle. The latter is revealed to be the "Red Angel", a character seen throughout the season. Several other recurring guests also return from the first season, including James Frain as Sarek, Mia Kirshner as Amanda Grayson, Mary Chieffo as L'Rell, and Jayne Brook as Katrina Cornwell. Introduced in the season are Bahia Watson as May Ahearn and Rachael Ancheril as Nhan. Kenneth Mitchell, who had a recurring role in the first season as the Klingon Kol, appears in the second season as Kol's relative Kol-Sha. He also portrays the older version of Tenavik, the son of L'Rell and Tyler.

Hannah Cheesman took over the role of Airiam for the season, with original actress Sara Mitich recast in the role of Nilsson. Other returners include Emily Coutts as Keyla Detmer, Patrick Kwok-Choon as Gen Rhys, Oyin Oladejo as Joann Owosekun, Ronnie Rowe Jr. as R. A. Bryce, Ali Momen as Kamran Gant, and Julianne Grossman as the voice of Discovery's computer. David Benjamin Tomlinson also appears throughout the season as Linus. Hannah Spear and Yadira Guevara-Prip respectively reprise their Star Trek: Short Trek roles of Saru's sister Siranna (from the short "The Brightest Star") and Tilly's friend Me Hani Ika Hali Ka Po (from the short "Runaway"). The episode "If Memory Serves" begins with archival footage from the original Star Trek pilot "The Cage" featuring the original actors for several characters seen in the series, including Spock, Pike, and Number One, as well as Vina and the Keeper, portrayed in Discovery by Melissa George and Rob Brownstein, respectively.

=== Design ===
==== Costumes ====
Costume designer Gersha Phillips and her team created over 180 different costumes for the season. For the Enterprise costumes, Phillips applied the colors from the costumes seen in the original series to the design and style of the Discovery uniforms. She noted that the collars on the Discovery uniforms already evoked the v-shape design of the original uniform collars. The difference in uniforms between the Discovery and Enterprise crews is explained when a character remarks that the more colorful uniforms are new and being introduced to Starfleet starting with Enterprise. Phillips and her team overlooked the fact that the Discovery uniforms identify rank through pips on their Starfleet badges which are not present on the Enterprise uniforms, and so there was no identification of rank on any of the Enterprise characters. The mistake was pointed out by John Van Citters, the vice president of Star Trek brand management at CBS Studios, and the solution was to add stripes to the sleeves of the uniforms. Visual effects were used to add these stripes to footage from before the mistake was discovered.

Phillips was asked to make the Section 31 costumes black, and to not give the characters a uniform. Phillips made sure these costumes were different from the cleaner style of the main Starfleet uniforms to highlight the different types of people hired by Section 31 and their different approach. She noted that this was appropriate for Georgiou, who Phillips felt "wouldn't wear a uniform, because she's not going to conform". Kurtzman's directions to Phillips regarding the Talosians was to look at the costumes from the original series and "revamp" them. After seeing her first designs for the costumes, Kurtzman asked her to take them further. Phillips used fabrics with puffy textures printed onto them for the costumes. The Talosians also wear necklaces that were designed in collaboration with jeweler Dana Schneider. The Red Angel suit was inspired by Scarlett Johansson's costume from the film Ghost in the Shell (2017), with Discovery's prop master Mario Moreira contributing to the design. It was created with companies Plassens and By Design using 3D printing. Phillips stated that all the actors who wore the suit said it was one of the most comfortable to wear, noting that this is not usually the case for actors wearing complex costumes.

For the Klingons, Phillips was excited to depict the species in a time of peace, and was able to produce several different costumes that were not warrior-based. Phillips noted that in previous appearances groups of Klingons were often depicted as wearing the same costume, but on Discovery there was a mandate to have more diverse looks within groups of aliens. L'Rell's costumes are provocative to show the character as "just being the woman that she [is] and have her feel more of a full character". Phillips was inspired by various Klingon costumes from Star Trek: The Next Generation for the season. One of L'Rell's dresses was created from a jumpsuit bought from Gelareh Designs, a clothing company that Phillips calls "the Klingon store". A cape for the dress was made from leather pieces that were lifted from the jumpsuit and painted.

==== Prosthetics ====
Glenn Hetrick and Neville Page of Alchemy Studios, who provide prosthetics and armor for the series, teased in May 2018 that the season would feature a "truly alien" character for which they had to figure out new ways to reduce the weight of the prosthetics and make it breathable for the actor, as well as try improve the actor's vision because the eyes of the creature did not align with where human eyes are positioned. Hetrick said there would be more interesting prosthetics for extras, while the pair were able to use a species from earlier Star Trek canon that had not been in the first season after producing a of species they would like to use for the executive producers.

==== Starships ====
Several new sets for the Discovery were built for the season, adding to the ones constructed for the first. These included a new "loop corridor" and new entrances to the mess hall and sick bay sets. The engineering set from the first season was also renovated for the second, with production designer Tamara Deverell explaining that the cinematography department had issues with the large amount of light coming from the spore chamber in contrast to the rest of the room. Additionally, some season one sets were repurposed for the second season, with Lorca's season one ready room becoming a new science lab for Burnham in the second season.

John Eaves and Scott Schneider, designers of the starships for the series, were required to redesign the USS Enterprise for Star Trek: Discovery, making it 25 percent different from Matt Jefferies' original design due to legal concerns regarding the ownership of different Star Trek elements. CBS ultimately confirmed that they were free to reuse Jefferies' design in Star Trek: Discovery, but stood by the changes made by Eaves and Schneider as creative improvements that took advantage of modern visual effects. These changes included adding elements that could realistically be removed or replaced in the time between this series and the beginning of the original series. The visual effects department made further adjustments to the design after Eaves and Schneider completed their work. The final version of the ship seen in the series also adopts some of the characteristics of the Enterprise from the films, such as being "a little bit fatter, a little bit bigger", to fit into the aesthetic of the series. Elaborating on this, Kurtzman explained that the original designs for the Enterprise would look out of place in the series due to the far more advanced modern technology being used to produce the show. He added that any sets designed for the Enterprise would bridge the look of the original series and Discovery while still trying to adhere to canon.

There had been plans to show the interior of the Enterprise during the first-season finale, but this was ultimately saved for the second season. Deverell did extensive research on the original sets before trying to recreate them using Discovery's style, including searching through the CBS archives to do color tests on the original bridge sets which feature a distinctive red that sometimes appeared to be orange on the original series (Discovery includes a joke about the bridge being orange, though Deverell insisted that it is red). The Enterprise bridge set was built on a new soundstage specifically for the two-part second season finale, rather than being a repurposed set. James Cawley, owner of the Official Star Trek Set Tour, provided reproductions of the buttons from the original bridge set for Deverell to base hers on.

=== Filming ===
Filming for the season began at Pinewood Toronto Studios on April 16, 2018, under the working title Green Harvest. Production was set to take place at the studio until November 8. At the time of Berg and Harberts' firing, production was underway on the fifth episode of the season, and a hiatus in filming was planned to follow that. This allowed Kurtzman to take the time to "regroup" the writing staff without delaying the season's production. The production was ultimately delayed enough that it needed to extend its time at Pinewood in order to complete the season, and to amortize these costs CBS added an additional episode to the season's run, which pushed the end of filming on the season to December 21. Due to the delay, episodic director Jonathan Frakes ultimately directed the ninth episode of the season instead of the originally planned tenth.

Kurtzman hoped that if the series was projected in a theater it would appear indistinguishable from a feature film, and chose to use anamorphic lenses for the season to "immediately [convey] a sense of scope and scale". He also pushed the lighting and design departments to use color in ways that are not traditionally considered for television, and challenged the episode directors to each shoot a scene where they would not use the same shot twice; this was to encourage them to use more inventive shot choices rather than just typical "coverage", which is when a master shot of the scene is filmed plus whatever extra angles from different sides there is time to capture. Kurtzman wanted as many options available to the editors as possible during post-production. Addressing the fact that Star Trek was originally inspired by naval tradition, Kurtzman said that the season would be leaning further into that than the first did, especially in the way that they filmed the bridge scenes and a funeral sequence. He named Crimson Tide (1995) as an influence for the filming style. Frakes reiterated the cinematic approach to the series, especially comparing the camera work to the style of the Star Trek films directed by J. J. Abrams. He added that Osunsanmi encouraged the episodic directors to "express ourselves visually in as exciting a way as possible".

During filming in August 2018, Mount was involved in an "on-set physical altercation" with a director when he touched them while rehearsing a pointing action before beginning a scene. The incident was reported to CBS's HR department who reviewed it and decided against any disciplinary action for Mount. The actor had apologized to the director at the time. The incident had no effect on Mount's involvement with the series, as work on the season continued without interruption and the series production was believed to be interested in working with Mount further despite his contract being only for the second season.

=== Visual effects ===
The season's visual effects were provided by CBS Digital, Crafty Apes, Filmworks FX, Fx3x, Ghost VFX, Pixomondo, and Spin VFX. They include digitally created environments and set extensions to portray new planets, the starships, and space visuals, as well as digital enhancements to Saru's threat ganglia, and adding holograms and external visuals to the Discovery. Completely digital sets created for the season include Discovery's hangar and the mycelial network, with the actors performing in front of green screen for these. An on-set prop was used for Tyler and L'Rell's baby son Tenavik, with a digital head added that was animated using performance capture.

=== Music ===
Composer Jeff Russo planned to begin work on the second season in May 2018, after receiving the first script for the season. He did not expect to significantly change the tone of his music for the season, feeling that so much work in the first season had gone towards creating a unique sound for the series within the Star Trek franchise which he would like to continue moving forward. Russo did feel that the score for the second season would focus more on the "swashbuckling" aspects he wrote at times for the first season. Russo generally works directly with the showrunners rather than any of the episodic directors but discussed his score for the season's second episode with director Frakes. A soundtrack album for the season was released digitally by Lakeshore Records on July 19, 2019. It includes three cues from Russo's Short Treks score. All music composed by Jeff Russo:

Original Series Soundtrack: Season 2
No.	Title	Length
1.	"The Final Frontier"	4:32
2.	"Christopher Pike"	2:20
3.	"Lost Communication"	2:10
4.	"What's Wrong"	1:27
5.	"All of Them"	2:40
6.	"I'm Coming Back"	1:39
7.	"Flashback"	3:30
8.	"Stuck"	1:43
9.	"The Cathedral"	2:52
10.	"He'll Never Know Me"	1:19
11.	"The Sphere"	0:44
12.	"Quarantined"	1:04
13.	"Shields"	3:05
14.	"Questions"	1:22
15.	"Prey"	3:34
16.	"The Hull"	4:06
17.	"Airlock"	2:03
18.	"Ariam in Space"	2:35
19.	"Fiercely Loyal"	3:06
20.	"Song of Remembrance"	0:59
21.	"On Site"	4:28
22.	"Two Minutes"	2:49
23.	"Big Picture"	2:38
24.	"Gone"	4:46
25.	"What Do They Call You"	1:38
26.	"Pillar of the Past"	5:00
27.	"Failure"	2:43
28.	"Essential Personnel"	2:17
29.	"Goodbyes"	2:59
30.	"Pike on the Bridge"	3:07
31.	"Ready"	3:15
32.	"Time Traveler"	2:45
33.	"Change"	1:41
34.	"Goodbye, Pike"	3:40
35.	"Spock's Personal Log"	4:43
36.	"Star Trek: Discovery End Credits (Season 2 Finale Version)"	1:04
37.	"Many Mudds" (From Short Treks: "The Escape Artist")	0:59
38.	"Star Trek: Short Treks End Credits (Lounge Version)" (From Short Treks: "The Escape Artist")	1:34
39.	"Star Trek: Short Treks Main Title (Disco Version)" (From Short Treks: "The Escape Artist")	0:19
Total length:		99:15

== Marketing ==
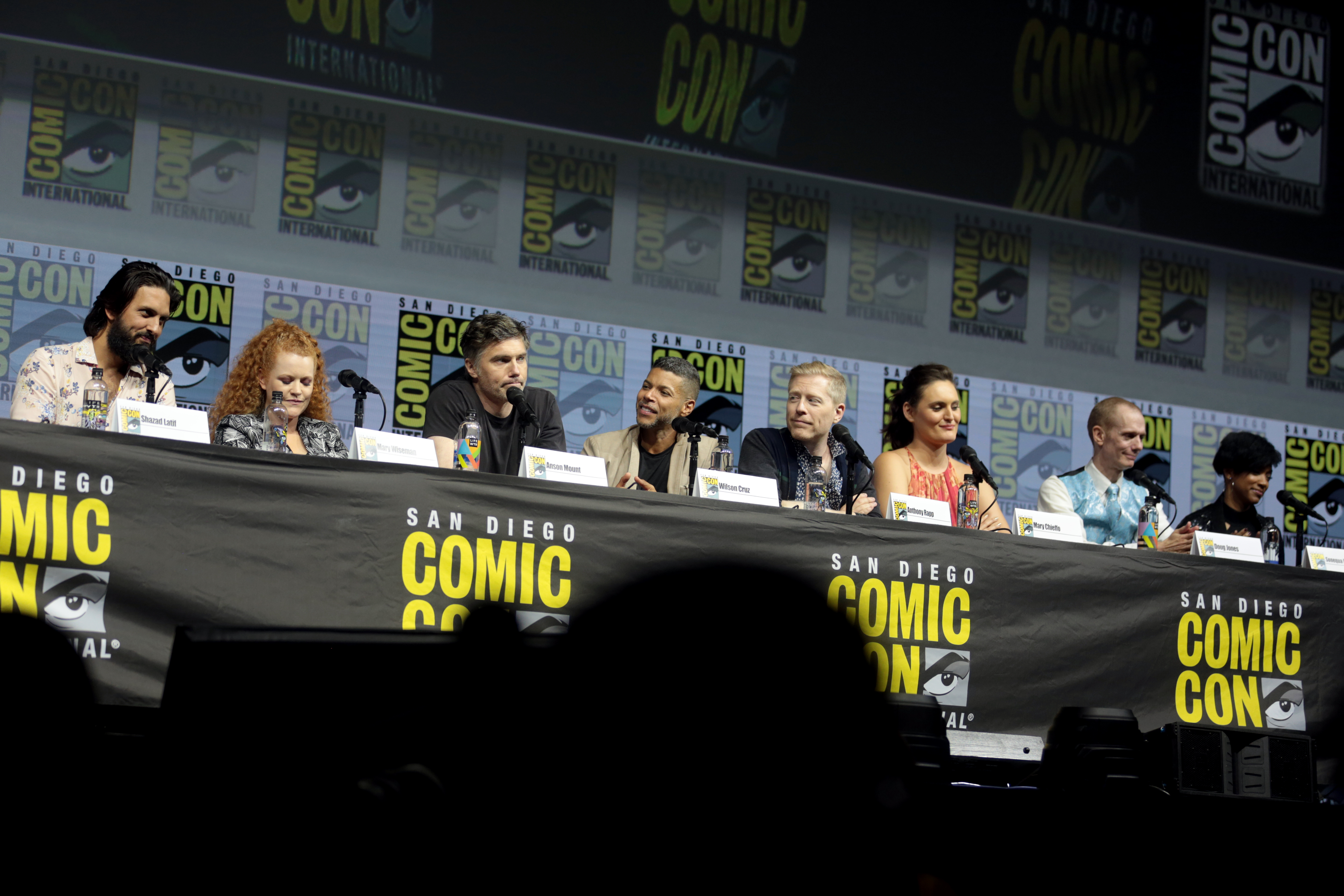
Star Trek: Discovery panel at the 2018 San Diego Comic-Con

The season was promoted at San Diego Comic-Con in July 2018, with Notaro moderating a panel that featured Kurtzman, Martin-Green, Jones, Latif, Wiseman, Rapp, Cruz, Chieffo, Mount, and executive producer Heather Kadin. The first trailer for the season debuted at the panel before being released online. Scott Collura at IGN highlighted the lighter tone of the trailer compared to the first season, as well as the Enterprise uniforms seen in the trailer. A second trailer for the season was revealed by Kurtzman and cast members for the season at a panel at New York Comic Con in October, providing a first look at the series' version of Spock.

After the season had completed airing, an exhibition for the series was held at the Paley Center for Media in Beverly Hills, California from May 8 to July 7, 2019, titled Star Trek: Discovery – Fight for the Future. It covered the creative process for the season, including production and concept art, models, props, and costumes used during production, pieces from the set such as the USS Discovery captain's chair, and full prosthetic makeup busts. The installation covered two floors of the Paley Center building, and was free to the public.

== Release ==
=== Streaming and broadcast ===
The season premiered on CBS All Access in the United States on January 17, 2019. Bell Media broadcast the season in Canada on CTV Sci-Fi Channel (English) and Z (French) on the same day as the U.S., before streaming episodes on Crave. Netflix released each episode for streaming in another 188 countries within 24 hours of its U.S. debut. In September 2020, ViacomCBS announced that CBS All Access would be expanded and rebranded as Paramount+ in March 2021. Existing episodes of the season remained on Paramount+ along with future seasons of the series. In November 2021, ViacomCBS announced that it had bought back the international streaming rights to Discovery from Netflix effective immediately. In August 2023, Star Trek content was removed from Crave and the season began streaming on Paramount+ in Canada. It would continue to be broadcast on CTV Sci-Fi and be available on CTV.ca and the CTV app.

The episode "The Sound of Thunder" was made available to stream for free on CBS.com, StarTrek.com, and PlutoTV for a week beginning June 17, 2020, as part of a CBS All Access event titled #StarTrekUnited. The episode was among 15 of the "most culturally relevant" Star Trek episodes that were chosen to be included as part of the event, which served as a fundraiser for several organisations including Black Strategy Fund, Movement for Black Lives, and Black Lives Matter. For the fundraiser, $1 was donated to one of those organizations by CBS All Access for every fan that tweeted using the hashtag #StarTrekUnitedGives on the day of June 17.

=== Home media ===
The season was released on DVD and Blu-Ray formats in the U.S. on November 12, 2019. The release includes two hours of bonus features, including featurettes, deleted scenes, a gag reel, and cast and crew commentaries on four episodes, as well as two shorts from the Star Trek: Short Treks companion series: "Runaway" and "The Brightest Star". On November 2, 2021, a home media box set collecting the first three seasons of Discovery was released, with more than eight hours of special features including behind-the-scenes featurettes, deleted and extended scenes, audio commentaries, and gag reels.

== Reception ==
=== Critical response ===
Star Trek: Discovery season 2: Critical reception by episode
Season 2 (2019): Percentage of positive critics' reviews tracked by the website Rotten Tomatoes

The review aggregator website Rotten Tomatoes reported an 81% approval rating for the second season, with an average rating of 7.35/10 based on 209 reviews. The website's critical consensus reads, "The second season of Discovery successfully—if stubbornly—cleans up the problematic storylines of Trek past while still effectively dramatizing new takes on the lore." The average rating for each of the season's individual episodes is 82%. Metacritic, which uses a weighted average, assigned a score of 72 out of 100 based on reviews from 10 critics, indicating "generally favorable" reviews.

Many reviews of the season premiere highlighted its lighter tone and focus on adventure compared to the darker, war-focused first season. This included Rob Owen, writing for the Pittsburgh Post-Gazette, who praised the episode for having "a little fun along the way", as Pike says. Verne Gay at Newsday called the episode "much more fun and energetic", scoring it three stars out of four. Gay also highlighted how expensive the season looked, comparing it to the production value of Game of Thrones, as well as the returning cast and new additions such as Notaro and Mount. Vox's Emily VanDerWerff also called the premiere fun, attributing that to Mount as well as the season's central mystery, new cast members like Notaro, and the more episodic style of storytelling. She expressed concern about the season's focus on previous Star Trek elements, but felt this would work if it used those elements to further explore the series' own characters. At Newsweek, Andrew Whelan thought the premiere was promising, highlighting its action scenes and the ensemble cast (especially Mount and Notaro). He was critical of the continued focus on Burnham's backstory rather than developing her character based on present actions.

Reviewing the full season, Jordan Hoffman of Polygon praised Mount and Peck, expressing disappointment that they would not be returning for the third season, and suggesting their stories be continued in some other way. Despite this, he was positive about the way the season still focused on Burnham and its other main characters rather than letting the existing Star Trek characters take over the series. Hoffman was also positive about the efforts made in the season finale to align the series with the existing Star Trek canon, and praised the decision to have the Discovery travel to the future believing that was "where they should have been in the first place". Vulture's Devon Maloney praised the season-long story arc and how the various mystery elements all came together in the finale. He described the changes made in the finale episode to line up with continuity as an "annoyingly clever retcon", and also highlighted the season's cinematic visuals and music which he compared to the Star Wars films. Scott Collura at IGN also praised the jump into the future, but felt the attempts to fix the franchise's continuity were less successful. Overall he felt the season was both "sloppy" and "pretty effective, offering up nice character interplay, crazy visuals and effects, and some 'whoa' moments of Star Trek grandeur". Collura also expressed interest in a new series following Spock on the Enterprise. Darren Franich was critical of the season at Entertainment Weekly, grading it a 'C−'. He felt the serialized story was too stretched out, said Burnham's character did not receive interesting development, and described the efforts made at the end of the season to tie-into existing continuity as "dumb". He did praise Mount and Notaro, and felt the next season could only be better than this one.

In addition to critics expressing interest in seeing Mount and Peck continue on in a new series after the end of the season, fans also began calling for such a series, including through online petitions. Mount and Peck both responded positively to the idea, as did Kurtzman, who said in April 2019, "The fans have been heard. Anything is possible in the world of Trek. I would love to bring back that crew more than anything." CBS All Access officially ordered a spin-off series focused on the Enterprise crew, titled Star Trek: Strange New Worlds, in May 2020. Mount, Peck, and Romijn all reprise their roles in the spin-off.

=== Accolades ===
The season is one of 21 television series that received the ReFrame Stamp for the 2018 to 2019 season. The stamp is awarded by the gender equity coalition ReFrame as a "mark of distinction" for film and television projects that are proven to have gender-balanced hiring, with stamps being awarded to projects that hire female-identifying people, especially women of color, in four out of eight critical areas of their production.

Year	Award	Category	Recipient	Result	Ref.
2019	Costume Designers Guild Awards	Excellence in Sci-Fi / Fantasy Television	Gersha Phillips	Nominated	
2019	Directors Guild of Canada	Best Production Design – Dramatic Series	Tamara Deverell (for "Such Sweet Sorrow, Part 2")	Won	
2019	Dragon Awards	Best Science Fiction or Fantasy TV Series	Star Trek: Discovery	Nominated	
2019	Hollywood Music in Media Awards	Original Score – TV Show / Limited Series	Jeff Russo	Nominated	
2019	Hollywood Professional Association	Outstanding Visual Effects – Episodic (Over 13 Episodes)	"Such Sweet Sorrow, Part 2"	Nominated	
2019	Primetime Creative Arts Emmy Awards	Outstanding Main Title Design	Star Trek: Discovery	Nominated	
2019	Primetime Creative Arts Emmy Awards	Outstanding Prosthetic Makeup for a Series, Limited Series, Movie or Special	"If Memory Serves"	Won	
2019	Primetime Creative Arts Emmy Awards	Outstanding Sound Editing for a Comedy or Drama Series (One-Hour)	"Such Sweet Sorrow, Part 2"	Nominated	
2019	Primetime Creative Arts Emmy Awards	Outstanding Special Visual Effects	"Such Sweet Sorrow, Part 2"	Nominated	
2019	Saturn Awards	Best Streaming Science Fiction, Action & Fantasy Series	Star Trek: Discovery	Won	
2019	Saturn Awards	Best Actress in a Streaming Presentation	Sonequa Martin-Green	Won	
2019	Saturn Awards	Best Supporting Actor in a Streaming Presentation	Wilson Cruz	Nominated	
2019	Saturn Awards	Best Supporting Actor in a Streaming Presentation	Doug Jones	Won	
2019	Saturn Awards	Best Supporting Actor in a Streaming Presentation	Ethan Peck	Nominated	
2019	World Soundtrack Awards	Best Television Composer of the Year	Jeff Russo (for Star Trek: Discovery and other series)	Nominated	
2020	GLAAD Media Awards	Outstanding Drama Series	Star Trek: Discovery	Nominated	
2020	Make-Up Artists and Hair Stylists Guild Awards	Best Special Make-Up Effects in Television and New Media Series	Glenn Hetrick, James MacKinnon, and Rocky Faulkner	Nominated	
