= Bolaji Badejo =

Nigerian actor (1953–1992)

- Badejo partially in costume on the set of Alien in 1979
- Born: 23 August 1953; Lagos, British Nigeria
- Died: 22 December 1992 (aged 39); Lagos, Nigeria
- Cause of death: Sickle cell disease
- Occupations: Actor; visual artist
- Years active: 1979
- Known for: Alien (1979)
- Height: 208 cm (6 ft 10 in)

Bolaji Badejo (23 August 1953 – 22 December 1992) was a Nigerian visual artist and a one-time actor, known for playing the Alien in Ridley Scott's 1979 film Alien. He was 208 cm (6 ft 10 inches) tall, a height which convinced Scott to cast him in the role. It is his sole acting credit.

== Life and career ==
Born in Lagos, Badejo was of Yoruba descent and was the son of the director general of the Nigerian Broadcasting Corporation. He studied in Ethiopia, then in the United States before finally moving to London to specialize in graphic design.

Badejo was discovered in a Soho pub by a member of director Ridley Scott's casting team, who had been searching for a candidate to play the titular creature in his science fiction horror film Alien. Standing at 208 cm (6 ft 10 inches) in height, he was chosen to play the part due to his height and "very long legs". He was described as "mild-mannered" and "withdrawn" on set, and special effects supervisor Nick Allder said "To have been the center of attraction… it was a bit of a shock to him." Alien was released in 1979 to significant critical and commercial success, and Screen Rant wrote in a retrospective review that he "effectively brought the Xenomorph to life ... Badejo certainly helped make the creature one of the most recognizable monsters in horror."

The success of Alien spawned the Alien franchise. Badejo was offered a role in a sequel, but moved back to Nigeria in 1980; this led to the sequels incorporating more puppetry and animation alongside several suit performers. Alien is his sole film credit.

After his return to Nigeria, Badejo began running his own art gallery in 1983. He died from sickle cell disease at the age of 39 in 1992.

== Filmography ==
List of acting credits for Bolaji Badejo
| Year | Title | Role | Notes |
|---|---|---|---|
| 1979 | Alien | Alien / Xenomorph | Feature film |

== See also ==
- Creature actor
