= Number One (Star Trek) =

Character of the television series Star Trek

Una Chin-Riley "Number One"
- Star Trek character
- Majel Barrett as Number One in the rejected 1965 pilot for Star Trek: The Original Series, "The Cage"
- First appearance: Majel Barrett: "The Cage" (1965); "The Menagerie" (1966); (The Original Series); Rebecca Romijn: "An Obol for Charon" (2019); (Star Trek: Discovery)
- Created by: Gene Roddenberry
- Portrayed by: Majel Barrett (1966); Rebecca Romijn (2019–present)
- Voiced by: Rebecca Romijn ("Those Old Scientists")

In-universe information
- Full name: Una Chin-Riley
- Nickname: Number One
- Species: Illyrian
- Gender: Female
- Position: USS Enterprise executive officer
- Affiliation: United Federation of Planets; Starfleet

Commander Una Chin-Riley, commonly and originally only known as Number One, is a fictional character in the science-fiction franchise Star Trek. She is Christopher Pike's second-in-command during his captaincy of the starship Enterprise.

She first appeared, portrayed by Majel Barrett, in "The Cage", the initial 1965 pilot episode of the original series. The pilot was rejected and most of its characters, including Number One, were omitted from the second pilot and the subsequent series (the relationship between Spock and Kirk emulated that of Number One and Pike). Footage from "The Cage" featuring the character was reused in the two-part story "The Menagerie" in 1966, establishing Pike and Number One as members of a previous crew of the Enterprise and part of the Star Trek canon; Barrett herself, who became the wife of Star Trek creator Gene Roddenberry, portrayed a number of unrelated characters in the franchise from 1966 to 2009, such as Nurse Christine Chapel in the original series, Lwaxana Troi in Star Trek: The Next Generation, and the voice of the Enterprise computer for both series.

In 2019, the second season of Star Trek: Discovery, set during Pike's tenure as captain of the Enterprise, featured Number One's first on-screen appearance in 53 years, now played by Rebecca Romijn. Romijn reprised her role in two episodes of Star Trek: Short Treks the same year, and, beginning in 2022, as a series regular in Star Trek: Strange New Worlds, which is centered on the adventures of Pike's crew.

== Appearances ==
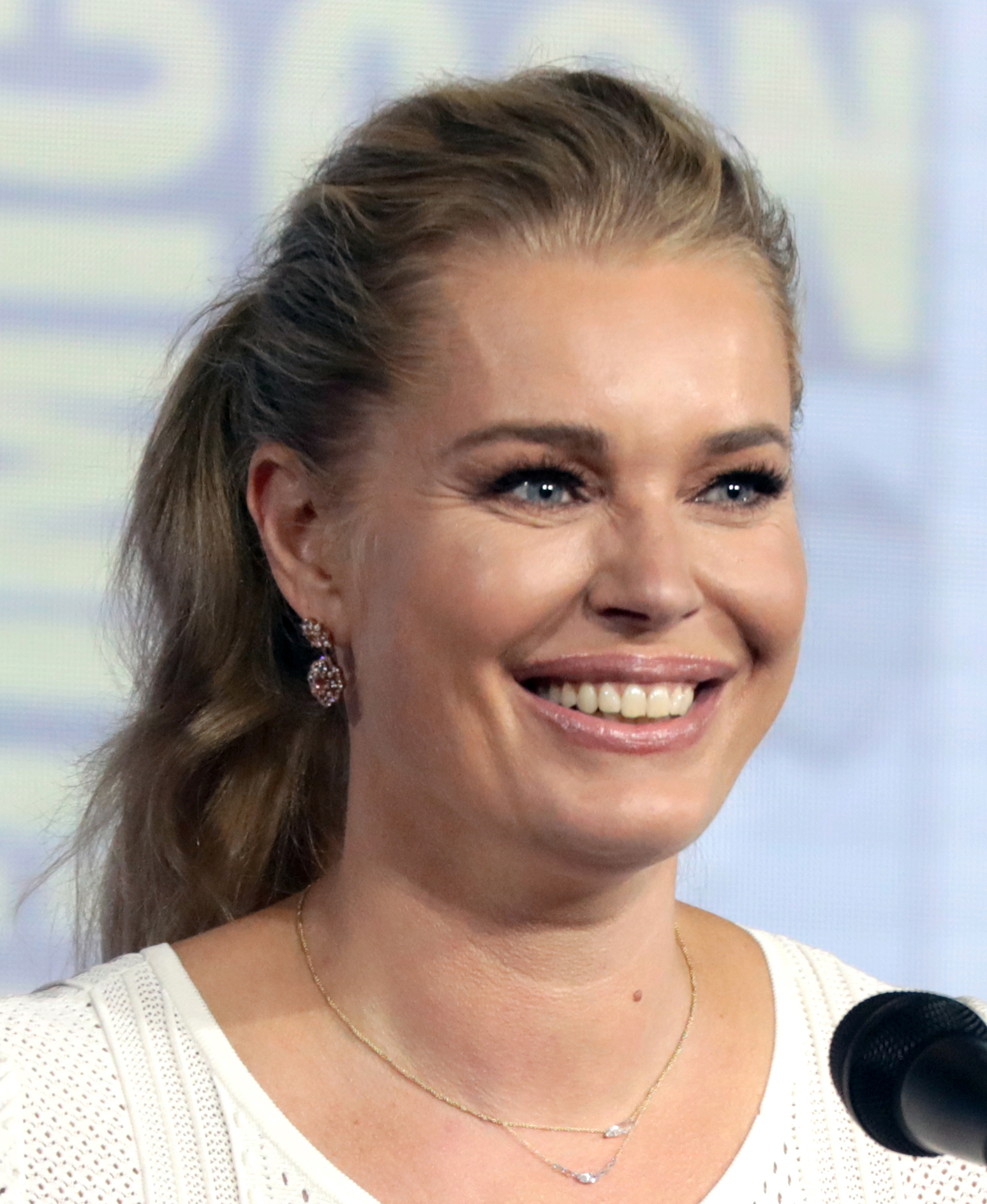
Rebecca Romijn portrays Number One/Una Chin-Riley in Star Trek: Discovery and Star Trek: Strange New Worlds

The character debuted in "The Menagerie" in 1966, and also in "The Cage", which was not broadcast until 1988. The character was not seen in live-action Star Trek again until 2019, when she was made a recurring character in the second season of the CBS All Access web series Star Trek: Discovery.

Her official biography notes that she is secretly attracted to Pike.

Number One appears in three episodes of the second season of Star Trek: Discovery, starting with the episode "An Obol for Charon", where she visits Pike on the USS Discovery. She briefs Pike on the repairs being made to the Enterprise and also provides him with information regarding the whereabouts of Lieutenant Spock. Number One is said to be a very resourceful individual (Pike wryly points out that "people have a tendency to end up owing her favors") and has a predilection for spicy food – in the mess hall scene with Pike, she orders a cheeseburger with habanero sauce.

The second-season finale of Discovery, "Such Sweet Sorrow", reveals that the character's first name is Una, while the third episode of Strange New Worlds, "Ghosts of Illyria", gives the character's full name as "Una Chin-Riley", and reveals that she is Illyrian rather than Human. Una is an Irish name, perhaps derived from a word meaning 'lamb'; the word una also means 'one' in Latin and Spanish, and 'first' in Tagalog.

Number One appears in two installments of the series of short films Star Trek: Short Treks.

== Controversy ==
During the development of the first pilot for Star Trek: The Original Series ("The Cage"), Roddenberry wrote the part of Number One specifically for Barrett. There was reluctance from the NBC executives to agree to an actress who was almost unknown. Roddenberry did see other actresses for the part, but no one else was considered.

According to Gene Roddenberry and Stephen Whitfield, the prominence of a woman among the crew of a starship was one of the reasons the original Star Trek pilot was rejected by NBC, who, in addition to calling the pilot "too cerebral," felt the alien Spock and a female senior officer would be rejected by audiences. Roddenberry related the tale of how women of the era had difficulty accepting her as well. Executive producer Herb Solow attempted to sell NBC executives on the idea that a fresh face would bring believability to the part, but they were aware that she was Roddenberry's girlfriend. Despite this, they agreed to her casting, not wanting to upset Roddenberry at this point in the production. After the pilot was rejected, a second pilot was produced. While it was generally explained that the network disliked a female character as the second-in-command of the Enterprise, Solow had a different opinion of events; he explained, "no one liked her acting... she was a nice woman, but the reality was, she couldn't act." In his book Inside Star Trek: The Real Story, Solow suggests the network had no problem with the character, but was infuriated when a relatively unknown actress was cast simply because she was having an affair with Roddenberry. Because of NBC's rare order of a second pilot, Roddenberry compromised by eliminating Number One, but aspects of her character—specifically, her cool demeanor and logical nature—were merged into Spock (who does appear in "The Cage") during the regular run of the series.

== Influence ==
On the series Star Trek: The Next Generation, Commander William Riker is usually (and informally) called "Number One" by Captain Picard, because of his position as first officer on the USS Enterprise. (In the episode "Disaster", Picard mentions that he always addresses his first officers as "Number One".) On the series Star Trek: Discovery, set in 2256 (two years after the events of "The Cage"), female Commander Michael Burnham is referred to as "Number One" by Captain Georgiou, because of her position as first officer on the USS Shenzhou. Series creator Bryan Fuller had originally intended only to refer to the character as Number One, in honor of Majel Barrett's character, but the name Burnham was instead revealed during the first episode. In Star Trek: Picard, retired Admiral Picard owns a Cane Corso dog called "Number One".

Number One was first referred to as "Una" in the non-canonical 2016 novel trilogy Star Trek: Legacies, which was published by Pocket Books to mark the original series's 50th anniversary. Authors Greg Cox, David Mack, Dayton Ward, and Kevin Dilmore gave her a first name because she had a central role in the novels. It has been suggested through several sources that this was done in honor of fellow Star Trek author Una McCormack. The name 'Una' became canon with its use in Star Trek: Discovery's second season finale.

== Reception ==
Barrett's role as Number One in the first pilot led to her being cast as Nurse Chapel in the original Star Trek television series. Much of "The Cage" pilot footage, including scenes with Barrett as Number One, was incorporated in the 1966 episode "The Menagerie". In 2017, Space.com ranked "The Menagerie" the third best episode of all Star Trek television. "The Cage" was supplied to NBC in 1965, but it was not released on VHS until 1986, and not broadcast until 1988. Accordingly, "The Menagerie" was the first public broadcast of this character on television.

In 2016, Number One was ranked as the 57th most important character in Starfleet within the Star Trek science fiction universe by Wired, out of 100 characters.

In 2017, CBR ranked Number One the ninth "fiercest" female character of the Star Trek universe.

In 2018, actress Rebecca Romijn was cast as the character Number One for Star Trek: Discovery season 2, and said that she was "honored to play such an iconic character." Romijn's performance was met with positive reception. The producers announced plans to bring back Romijn as Number One for two episodes Star Trek: Short Treks and subsequently as a main character on Star Trek: Strange New Worlds.
