= Star Trek: Short Treks =

2018 anthology television series

- Genre: Anthology; Science fiction
- Created by: Bryan Fuller; Alex Kurtzman
- Based on: Star Trek by Gene Roddenberry (Note: The episode "Children of Mars", a prelude to Star Trek: Picard, is credited as being based on Star Trek: The Next Generation just like Picard is.)
- Showrunner: Alex Kurtzman
- Theme music composer: Jeff Russo
- Country of origin: United States
- Original language: English
- No. of seasons: 2
- No. of episodes: 10

Production
- Executive producers: Alex Kurtzman; Heather Kadin; Akiva Goldsman; Frank Siracusa; John Weber; Eugene Roddenberry; Trevor Roth
- Production locations: Toronto, Canada
- Running time: 8–18 minutes
- Production companies: Secret Hideout; Roddenberry Entertainment; CBS Television Studios

Original release
- Network: CBS All Access
- Release: October 4, 2018 – January 9, 2020

Related
- Star Trek TV series; Star Trek: Discovery; Star Trek: Picard

Star Trek: Short Treks is an American science fiction anthology television series created by Bryan Fuller and Alex Kurtzman for the streaming service CBS All Access. Originating as a companion series to Star Trek: Discovery, it consists of several 10- to 20-minute-long shorts that use settings and characters primarily from Discovery.

After signing a deal to expand the Star Trek franchise on television, Kurtzman announced Short Treks as the first such project in July 2018. The first four episodes aired from October 2018 to January 2019, between the first and second seasons of Discovery. The shorts were mostly produced by cast and crew members from Discovery, including composer Jeff Russo who provided an updated main title theme and original underscore. Filming took place in Toronto, Canada, on the set of Discovery.

In January 2019, two new animated shorts were revealed, with four additional live-action episodes announced in June 2019. The second season of shorts aired from October 2019 to January 2020, between the second season of Discovery and the first season of Star Trek: Picard, with the last short serving as a teaser for the latter series. The animated shorts were created by visual effects house Pixomondo, while a roster of new composers supervised by Michael Giacchino provided the music for the second set of shorts.

The series has received positive reviews and been nominated for several awards, including a Primetime Emmy Award. Kurtzman expressed interest in continuing the series, but the producers chose not to begin work on any new shorts when the COVID-19 pandemic began.

== Premise ==
Each episode of Star Trek: Short Treks tells a stand-alone story that explores key characters and ideas from Star Trek: Discovery and other Star Trek series.

== Episodes ==
Seasons of Star Trek: Short Treks
Season	Episodes	Originally released	
Season	Episodes	First released	Last released
1	4	October 4, 2018	January 3, 2019
2	6	October 5, 2019	January 9, 2020

=== Season 1 (2018–19) ===
The first set of Short Treks were released between the first and second seasons of Star Trek: Discovery.

No. overall	No. in season	Title	Directed by	Written by	Original release date
1	1	"Runaway"	Maja Vrvilo	Jenny Lumet and Alex Kurtzman	October 4, 2018
Following a discussion with her condescending mother, Sylvia Tilly encounters a young Xahean stowaway, Me Hani Ika Hali Ka Po. Tilly, who is accustomed to taking orders, decides to make her own decisions to help Po return home in time for her coronation. Cast: Mary Wiseman as Silvia Tilly, Yadira Guevara-Prip as Me Hani Ika Hali Ka Po, and Mimi Kuzyk as Siobhan Tilly
2	2	"Calypso"	Olatunde Osunsanmi	Story by : Sean Cochran and Michael Chabon; Teleplay by : Michael Chabon	November 8, 2018
The USS Discovery has held position in space for a thousand years, and its computer system Zora has become sentient. She retrieves a passing escape pod carrying a man named Craft. Zora keeps Craft aboard the ship and begins to fall in love with him, but eventually lets him take Discovery's last shuttle to return to his family on Alcor IV. Cast: Aldis Hodge as Craft and Annabelle Wallis as the voice of Zora (with Sash Striga as the hologram of Zora)
3	3	"The Brightest Star"	Douglas Aarniokoski	Bo Yeon Kim & Erika Lippoldt	December 6, 2018
On the planet Kaminar, Saru wants to learn about life outside the pre-warp society of his village, where his people are harvested as food by the predatory Ba'ul. Saru is able to send a distress signal into space that is answered by Lieutenant Philippa Georgiou, who invites Saru to join Starfleet. Cast: Doug Jones as Saru, Hannah Spear as Siranna, Robert Verlaque as Aradar, and Michelle Yeoh as Philippa Georgiou
4	4	"The Escape Artist"	Rainn Wilson	Michael McMahan	January 3, 2019
Harry Mudd is captured by a bounty hunter and taken to a Federation ship, but there the hunter finds multiple versions of Mudd already detained. Elsewhere, the real Mudd continues to create android replicas of himself, capitalizing on his own notoriety and confounding the authorities. Cast: Rainn Wilson as Harry Mudd

=== Season 2 (2019–20) ===
The second set of Short Treks were released between the second season of Star Trek: Discovery and the first season of Star Trek: Picard.

No. overall	No. in season	Title	Directed by	Written by	Original release date
5	1	"Q&A"	Mark Pellington	Michael Chabon	October 5, 2019
On his first day aboard the USS Enterprise, Ensign Spock and his new superior officer Number One are trapped in a turbolift. While waiting for it to be repaired, Spock asks Number One numerous questions and they bond over their similarities. Cast: Rebecca Romijn as Number One, Ethan Peck as Spock, and Anson Mount as Christopher Pike
6	2	"The Trouble with Edward"	Daniel Gray Longino	Graham Wagner	October 10, 2019
On the USS Cabot, science officer Edward Larkin tries to solve a planet's food shortage by adding human DNA to tribbles, against his captain's orders, creating a species that is born pregnant and reproduces at an exponential rate. The Cabot is overrun and Larkin dies when he is trapped under multiplying tribbles and left behind while the rest of the crew escapes. Cast: Anson Mount as Christopher Pike, Rosa Salazar as Lynne Lucero, and H. Jon Benjamin as Edward Larkin
7	3	"Ask Not"	Sanji Senaka	Kalinda Vazquez	November 14, 2019
When Starbase 28 is attacked, Cadet Thira Sidhu is given care of a mutinous prisoner: Captain Christopher Pike of the Enterprise. Pike tries to pressure Sidhu into releasing him, but she refuses. He then reveals it is a simulated test that Sidhu has passed, allowing her to join the crew of the Enterprise. Cast: Anson Mount as Christopher Pike, Ethan Peck as Spock, Rebecca Romijn as Number One, and Amrit Kaur as Thira Sidhu
8	4	"Ephraim and Dot"	Michael Giacchino	Chris Silvestri & Anthony Maranville	December 12, 2019
Ephraim, a tardigrade looking for a place to lay her eggs, crosses paths with the USS Enterprise and is attacked by a repair drone named Dot. When the Enterprise self-destructs, Dot helps save Ephraim's eggs. When the eggs hatch, the pair travel with the baby tardigrades together. Cast: Narrated by Kirk Thatcher, with archival recordings of William Shatner as James T. Kirk, Ricardo Montalbán as Khan Noonien Singh, and George Takei as Hikaru Sulu
9	5	"The Girl Who Made the Stars"	Olatunde Osunsanmi	Brandon Schultz	December 12, 2019
Young Michael Burnham's father eases her fear of the dark by telling her a story about a young African girl. In the story, the girl's people fear the dark because of a predatory Night Beast, but she braves the night and discovers an alien that gifts her new light. The girl uses this to create the stars, and grows up to be a warrior queen. Cast: Kenric Green as Mike Burnham and Kyrie McAlpin as Michael Burnham
10	6	"Children of Mars"	Mark Pellington	Kirsten Beyer & Jenny Lumet & Alex Kurtzman	January 9, 2020
Two schoolgirls on Earth develop a fierce rivalry but are drawn together by a tragedy when they see news of Mars and its shipyard facilities (where both girls have family working) attacked by rogue synthetics. During the news footage an image of Admiral Jean-Luc Picard appears, with the network reporting that Picard called the attack "devastating". Cast: Ilamaria Ebrahim as Kima and Sadie Munroe as Lil

== Production ==
=== Development ===
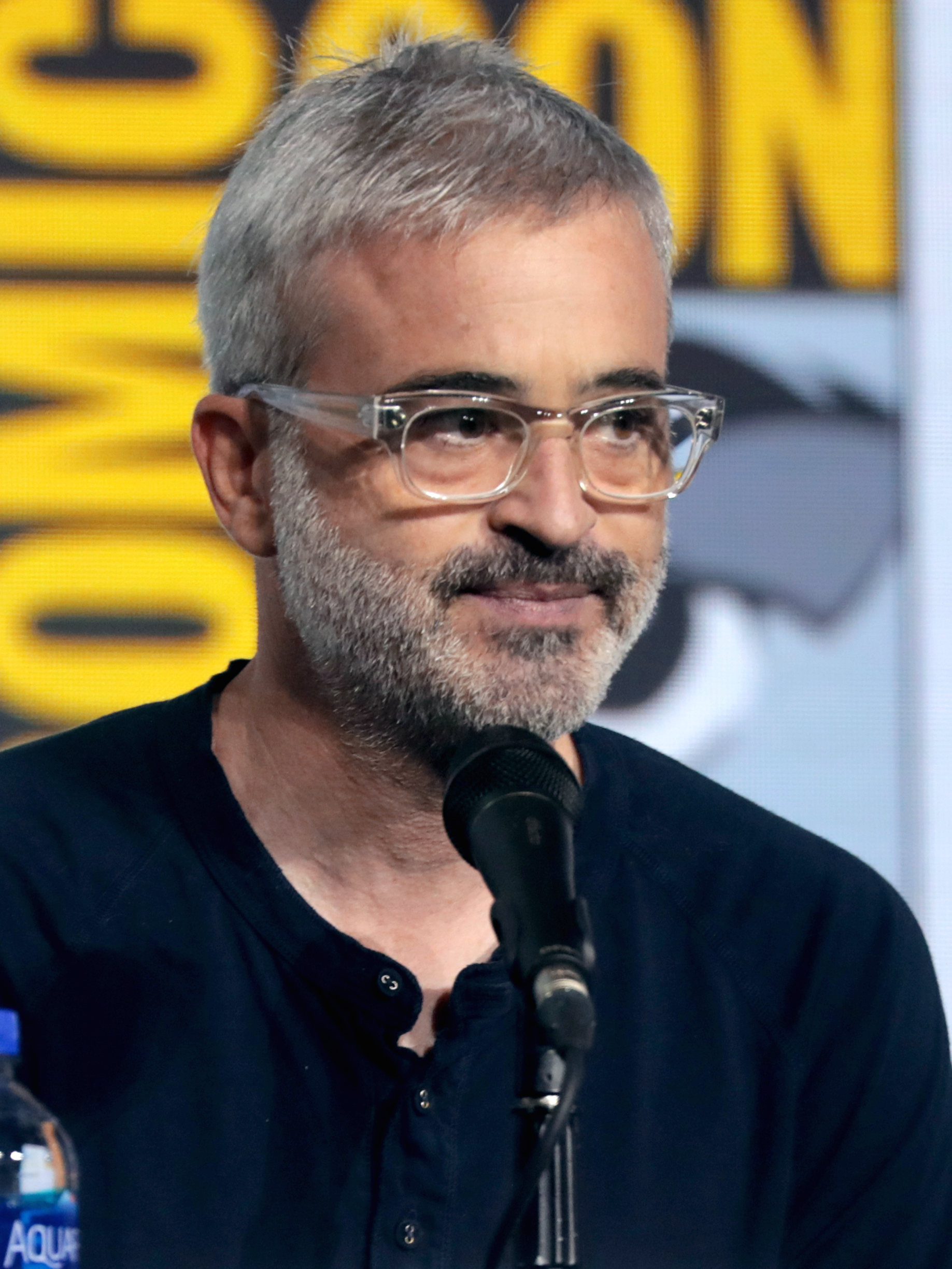
Co-creator Alex Kurtzman said the series was designed to buy time for the second season of Star Trek: Discovery to be completed.

In June 2018, after becoming sole showrunner of the series Star Trek: Discovery, Alex Kurtzman signed a five-year overall deal with CBS Television Studios to expand the Star Trek franchise beyond Discovery to several new series, miniseries, and animated series. A month later, he announced at San Diego Comic-Con that a spin-off miniseries titled Star Trek: Short Treks, consisting of four shorts, would be released monthly between the first two seasons of Discovery. He said they would "deliver closed-ended stories while revealing clues about what's to come in future Star Trek: Discovery episodes. They'll also introduce audiences to new characters who may inhabit the larger world of Star Trek." The shorts were expected to be around 10 to 15 minutes long.

Kurtzman said Short Treks was devised as a way to buy time so they could get the second season of Discovery right. The shorts were designed to tie-in with the second season of Discovery, but appear standalone at first so those connections would be a surprise for fans. CBS CCO David Nevins indicated in December 2018 that there would be more shorts released between the end of Discovery's second season and the release of the new series Star Trek: Picard. A month later, CBS All Access was confirmed to have ordered two new animated installments of Short Treks to be released in that time period. Kurtzman described the shorts as expanding "the definition of Star Trek" and allowing them to tell "very intimate, emotional stories that are side stories to characters. So you get the benefit of the experience in and of itself but then when you watch Discovery you'll see that these were all setting up things" in the main series. Kurtzman suggested in February that future shorts could tie directly into other new Star Trek series, and be used to introduce ideas to audiences and set up mysteries. At San Diego Comic-Con 2019, Kurtzman announced that the second season of Short Treks would consist of four new live-action shorts in addition to the two animated shorts previously announced, including one that ties-into Picard.

After the second set of shorts were released, Kurtzman said the series was an interesting way to test both new stories and new filmmakers, with writers, directors, and composers on the shorts going on to work on other Star Trek series. He also said this short-form story telling was satisfying, comparing the shorts to those created by Pixar. He revealed that one of the first ideas discussed for Short Treks was a story featuring Nichelle Nichols in her original Star Trek role of Uhura. The short would have seen a young Jean-Luc Picard visit Uhura in hospital and receive a mission related to the Borg. These discussions led to the development of Star Trek: Picard with an older Jean-Luc Picard, but Kurtzman said this story could still be told at some point.

Short Treks was reportedly ordered for a third season in January 2020, with production scheduled to take place from May to June. Chabon said in March that there were no plans for any shorts based on Picard to be released between the first and second seasons of that series. No other shorts had begun production by July, when the series received an Emmy Award nomination. Kurtzman said he hoped the accolade would lead to more Short Treks being made and he wanted to use future shorts to expand the franchise in new directions such as a musical short or a black-and-white short. In January 2021, Kurtzman explained that further shorts had not been made due to the COVID-19 pandemic, since the restrictions on filming meant they had to focus on what they definitely needed to film for the main series. He expressed interest in making more shorts in the future.

=== Live-action shorts ===
Of the initial four shorts ordered in July 2018, three were set to each focus on a character from Discovery: Mary Wiseman's Silvia Tilly, Doug Jones's Saru, and Rainn Wilson's Harry Mudd. Jones's short would explore the backstory of Saru, while Wilson would also direct the short that he was starring in. Aldis Hodge was set to star in the fourth short as a new character, Craft. The shorts were produced on the set of Discovery in Toronto, Canada. In August, Wilson revealed that his short was written by a writer from the popular science fiction animated series Rick and Morty and described it as "very funny and weird. You see some alien situations you have never seen before in the Star Trek canon, and I am thrilled." He added that in making the short he assumed it was set after his last Discovery appearance, "Magic to Make the Sanest Man Go Mad", but he was not certain of this since it is standalone and does not directly tie-in to Discovery. The Rick and Morty writer of his short was later revealed to be Star Trek fan Mike McMahan, who went on to create the animated comedy series Star Trek: Lower Decks.

Wiseman explained in October 2018 that her short, titled "Runaway", expands on Tilly's character and introduces her mother but otherwise would not affect the second season, so anyone who did not see the short could still understand the main series. Because of this, she did not have an exact placement of the short in the series' timeline though Jones pointed out that Tilly's hair style changes between the two seasons of Discovery and her hair in the short matches with the style from the second season. Jones confirmed that his short, "The Brightest Star", is set before Discovery and explores how Saru first joins Starfleet. He said the short has "breadcrumbs" and "hints" for the events of Discovery's second season, but the idea was still for the short and the second season to stand alone. Novelist Michael Chabon joined the series as the writer of Hodge's short, "Calypso", through Discovery executive producer Akiva Goldsman who he had been working with on a film project. Chabon went on to be the showrunner of Star Trek: Picard. This short was the first work Chabon wrote for television to actually be produced. "Calypso" is set in the far future when the Discovery's computer has become a sentient AI named Zora. The third season of Discovery began building towards this future by introducing an early version of Zora.

After Anson Mount was confirmed to be leaving Discovery with the second-season finale, fans began calling, including through online petitions, for him to reprise his role of Christopher Pike in a spin-off set on the USS Enterprise, alongside Rebecca Romijn as Number One and Ethan Peck as Spock. Mount and Peck both responded positively to the idea. In April 2019, Kurtzman also expressed interest, saying, "The fans have been heard. Anything is possible in the world of Trek. I would love to bring back that crew more than anything." When announcing the second season of Short Treks at San Diego Comic-Con in 2019, Kurtzman said three of the new stories would feature the Enterprise actors, with the fourth live-action short being a "teaser" for Picard set 15 years before the start of that series. Kurtzman said the Enterprise-based shorts were a way to bring those characters and actors back now that Discovery had jumped into the future for its third season, but they would not preclude a potential spin-off series from being made. When a spin-off series starring Mount, Peck, and Romijn was officially ordered by CBS All Access in May 2020, Dominic Patten of Deadline Hollywood opined that the Enterprise-set Short Treks retroactively appeared to be "rehearsals" for the series, which was titled Star Trek: Strange New Worlds. For "The Trouble with Edward", Kurtzman brought in Casper Kelly to work on the "faux Tribbles cereal commercial" post-credits scene. This led to Kelly creating the comedic, non-canon shorts series Star Trek: very Short Treks.

=== Animated shorts ===
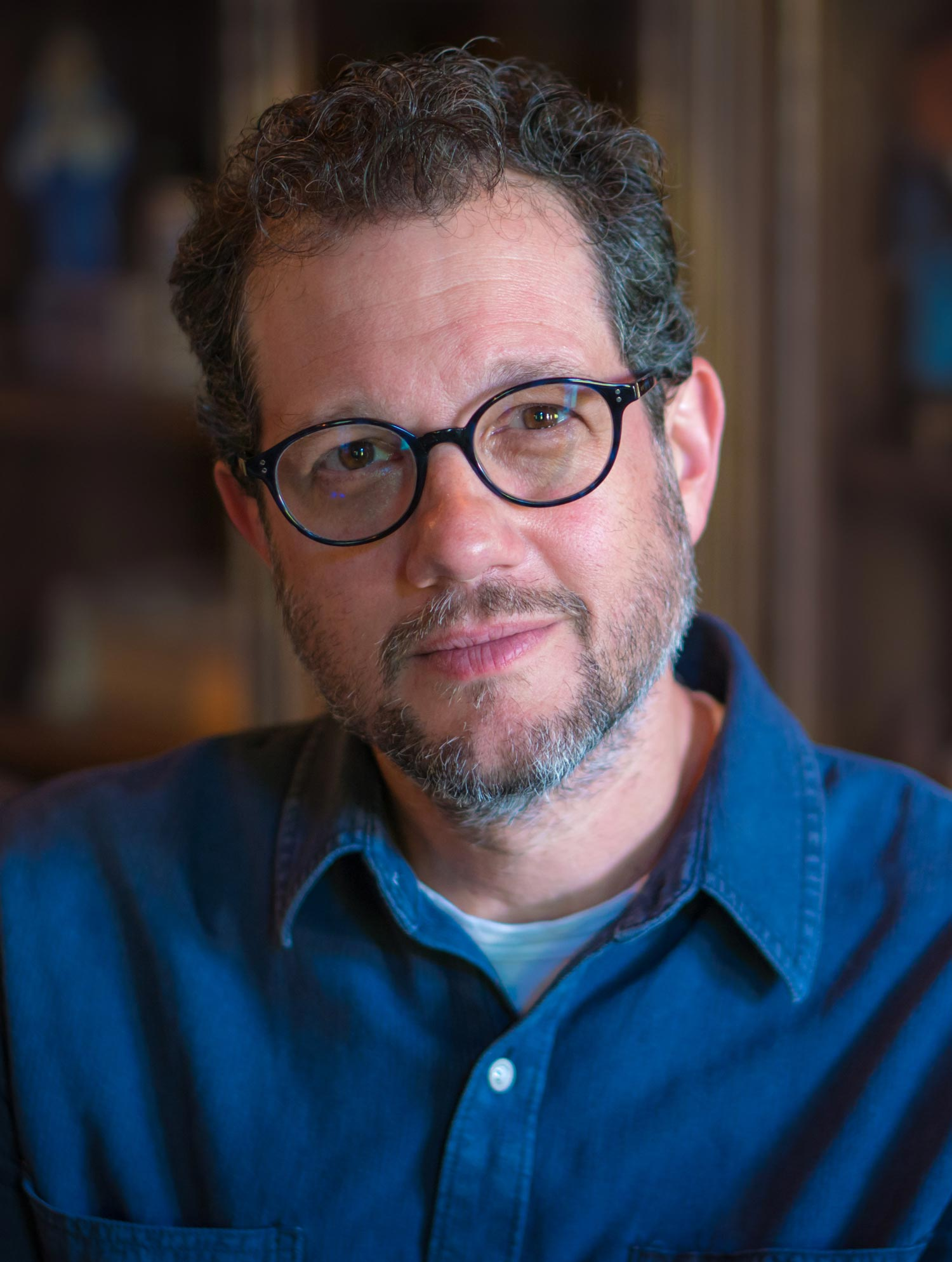
Michael Giacchino directed and composed the music for the animated short "Ephraim and Dot" and also supervised the composers for some other shorts.

Kurtzman explained in February 2019 that the first two animated shorts would have a different animation style from the series Lower Decks. He added that the first short would be directed by Discovery producing director Olatunde Osunsanmi and the second would be directed by composer Michael Giacchino (who wrote the score for the Star Trek reboot films that Kurtzman wrote). Producer Heather Kadin said the animated shorts would answer questions that previous Discovery seasons had left and "fill in some blanks", while Kurtzman elaborated that the two shorts would have different animation styles from one another based on the story and tone of each installment. Pixomondo provided the animation for the shorts.

The ideas for the two shorts were set before Giacchino joined, and he was able to choose which one he would direct. He chose "Ephraim and Dot", which focuses on a female tardigrade and a DOT-7 repair droid. Discovery originally included a tardigrade named Ephraim as a starring character, but the idea was abandoned due to budgetary requirements. A male tardigrade named Ephraim was then introduced as a major character in the Discovery tie-in novel Dead Endless. DOT-7 repair droids were introduced in the second-season finale of Discovery. Giacchino wanted the short to be like an episode of Tom and Jerry set on the Enterprise. The original designs for Ephraim were based on the tardigrades that Pixomondo created for Discovery, which looked much more like real tardigrades, but Giacchino asked to add eyes and a mouth to the character model so she could express emotions clearly throughout the short. Similarly, the model for Dot was designed to stretch and move in ways that a real robot would not to help show more emotion from the character. This stretching was part of Giacchino's aim to use traditional animation techniques, such as those seen in the works of Tex Avery, to give the short a more retro style than modern, computer-generated animation generally has. The short takes place across 30 years of Star Trek history, and Giacchino was excited to include several easter eggs to other parts of the Star Trek franchise. The short recreates scenes from the Star Trek: The Original Series episodes "Space Seed", "The Naked Time", "Who Mourns for Adonais?", "The Doomsday Machine", "The Tholian Web", and "The Savage Curtain", as well as the films Star Trek II: The Wrath of Khan (1982) and Star Trek III: The Search for Spock (1984). Original audio from some of the episodes was reused for these scenes. The short ends with the USS Enterprise labelled as NCC-1701-A, which is a different ship from later in the franchise's timeline. Giacchino acknowledged this mistake after the episode's release and indicated that it could be addressed moving forward.

Osunsanmi's "The Girl Who Made the Stars" originated from Discovery writer Brandon Schulze wanting to expand on the character of Mike Burnham, father of that series' protagonist Michael Burnham, as Schulze identified with the character as a black man with a young daughter. Schulze co-wrote the episode that introduced Kenric Green as Mike in Discovery, and pitched an idea for the second-season finale where Mike would be shown in flashback telling the story of a young African girl to Michael. This would have mirrored the second-season premiere where Michael recounts that story herself. The flashback did not fit in the season finale, but Kurtzman liked the idea and it was developed into an animated episode of Short Treks with Green reprising his role. The story is based on an actual African legend, but Schulze wanted to bring the ideas of the myth into the world of Star Trek and embellish the original ideas based on Michael's imagination, which included introducing an alien being into the story. Osunsanmi was comfortable working with Pixomondo for the short after collaborating with the company on the visual effects for Discovery as a director on that show. He explained that the short was animated to try capture the magical feeling they wanted the story to have, and because of this he did not want the style to be too realistic. The designs of the Burnhams were based on their appearances in Discovery while the African part of the short was based on images of Africa and African tribes from across the continent.

=== Music ===
Star Trek: Discovery composer Jeff Russo returned for the first season of Short Treks. He based the main theme for the series on his Discovery title theme, and he was able to produce a different version of it for "The Escape Artist" which is not something Russo had been able to do for any episodes of the main series. Russo approached each short's underscore individually. He was unsure how to approach the score for "Calypso" at first, and whether to have it similar to the music for Discovery due to that ship's presence or to intentionally make it different due to the different time that the short is set in. Russo was ultimately inspired for the music by the dance sequence in the short. Three cues from Russo's "The Escape Artist" score—"Many Mudds", "Star Trek Short Treks End Credits (Lounge Version)", and "Star Trek Short Treks Main Title (Disco Version)"—were released on the soundtrack album for the second season of Discovery alongside Russo's score for that season. The album was released digitally by Lakeshore Records on July 19, 2019.

By the time work began on the second set of shorts, Russo was working on the score for Picard and did not have time to score each of the new shorts, though Kurtzman still asked him to compose the music for "Children of Mars" since that short ties-into Picard. Giacchino was set to compose the music for his short "Ephraim and Dot", and Kurtzman asked him to provide music for the rest of the shorts as well. Giacchino was busy with film projects at the time, but suggested hiring a diverse group of composers who had not been given such an opportunity which he felt was in the spirit of Star Trek. Giacchino supervised this group of composers, which consisted of Nami Melumad for "Q&A", Sahil Jindal for "The Trouble with Edward", Andrea Datzman for "Ask Not", and Kris Bowers for "The Girl Who Made the Stars". Two cues from Russo's "Children of Mars" score—"Page" and "Children Of Mars End Credits"—were released on the soundtrack album for the first season of Picard on February 7, 2020. Melumad went on to compose for Strange New Worlds and Star Trek: Prodigy.

== Release ==
=== Streaming ===
The shorts were released on CBS All Access in the United States. Bell Media broadcast the series in Canada on the specialty channels CTV Sci-Fi Channel (English) and Z (French) before streaming them on Crave. The first four shorts were released monthly, beginning in October 2018 and ending in January 2019. At the end of January the first set of shorts were made available to countries outside of the U.S. and Canada on Netflix under the "Trailers and More" section of the streaming service's Star Trek: Discovery page. The first two shorts of the second season were released in October 2019 in the U.S. and Canada, with monthly releases through January 2020. After the second set of shorts had all been released on All Access, Kurtzman said he expected they would be released on Netflix "at some point". The second season was made available for free in the U.S. on CBS.com, CBS mobile apps, and YouTube from August 17 to 31, 2020, as part of the series' Emmy Awards campaign. In September 2020, ViacomCBS announced that CBS All Access would be expanded and rebranded as Paramount+ in March 2021, with the existing episodes of Short Treks remaining on Paramount+. In August 2023, Star Trek content was removed from Crave so it could be released in Canada on Paramount+.

=== Home media ===
The two shorts from the first set that tie directly into the second season of Discovery, "Runaway" and "The Brightest Star", were included on the Blu-ray and DVD set of that season alongside all the season's episodes and several bonus features. This was released in the U.S. on November 12, 2019. A home media release collecting nine of the shorts was released in the U.S. on June 2, 2020. It includes the four original shorts—"Runaway", "Calypso", "The Brightest Star", and "The Escape Artist"—the three USS Enterprise-based shorts—"Q&A", "The Trouble With Edward", and "Ask Not"—and the first two animated shorts—"Ephraim & Dot" and "The Girl Who Made the Stars". The collection also includes making-of featurettes as well as audio commentaries with writers Alex Kurtzman and Jenny Lumet for "Runaway" and star Anson Mount for "Ask Not". "Children of Mars" was released on October 6, 2020, on the home media set for Picard's first season which includes all of that season's episodes. The release also includes an audio commentary for the short with writers Kurtzman, Lumet, and Kirsten Beyer.

== Reception ==
=== Critical response ===
In a positive review, IGN's Scott Collura mostly praised the series after the release of the first four episodes saying, "The Short Treks have been an interesting experiment that have mostly worked, and it seems with this final installment that the Trek production team was just starting to nail the formula down." In 2020, Space.com recommended watching the short "Children of Mars" as background for Star Trek: Picard.

=== Accolades ===
Year	Award	Category	Nominee(s)	Result	Ref.
2019	Golden Reel Awards	Live Action Under 35:00	"The Brightest Star"	Won	
2019	Costume Designers Guild Awards	Excellence in Short Film Design	Gersha Phillips (for "The Brightest Star")	Nominated	
2020	Golden Reel Awards	Live Action Under 35:00	"The Trouble with Edward"	Nominated	
2020	Primetime Emmy Awards	Outstanding Short Form Comedy or Drama Series	Star Trek: Short Treks	Nominated	
