= Creature actor =

Acting term

A creature actor or creature performer is an actor who depicts a creature of radically different appearance than their own using a creature suit, with or without prosthetic makeup, mechanical puppetry and computer-generated visual effects. It is similar to the role of a suit actor in Japanese tokusatsu films.

== List of creature actors ==
- Ricou Browning
- Bill Skarsgård
- Doug Jones
- Andy Serkis
- Bolaji Badejo
- Brian Steele
- Camden Toy
- Dane DiLiegro
- Derek Mears
- Douglas Tait
- Edd Osmond
- George Barrows
- Haruo Nakajima
- Ian Whyte
- Javier Botet
- Joonas Suotamo
- Kevin Peter Hall
- Lon Chaney Jr.
- Morgana Ignis
- Peter Mayhew
- Robert Bobroczkyi
- Robert Strange
- Terry Notary
- Tom Woodruff Jr.
- Warwick Davis
- Rick Baker

== See also ==
- Motion capture
- Physical theatre
- Stunt performer
