= Rebecca Romijn =

American actress (born 1972)

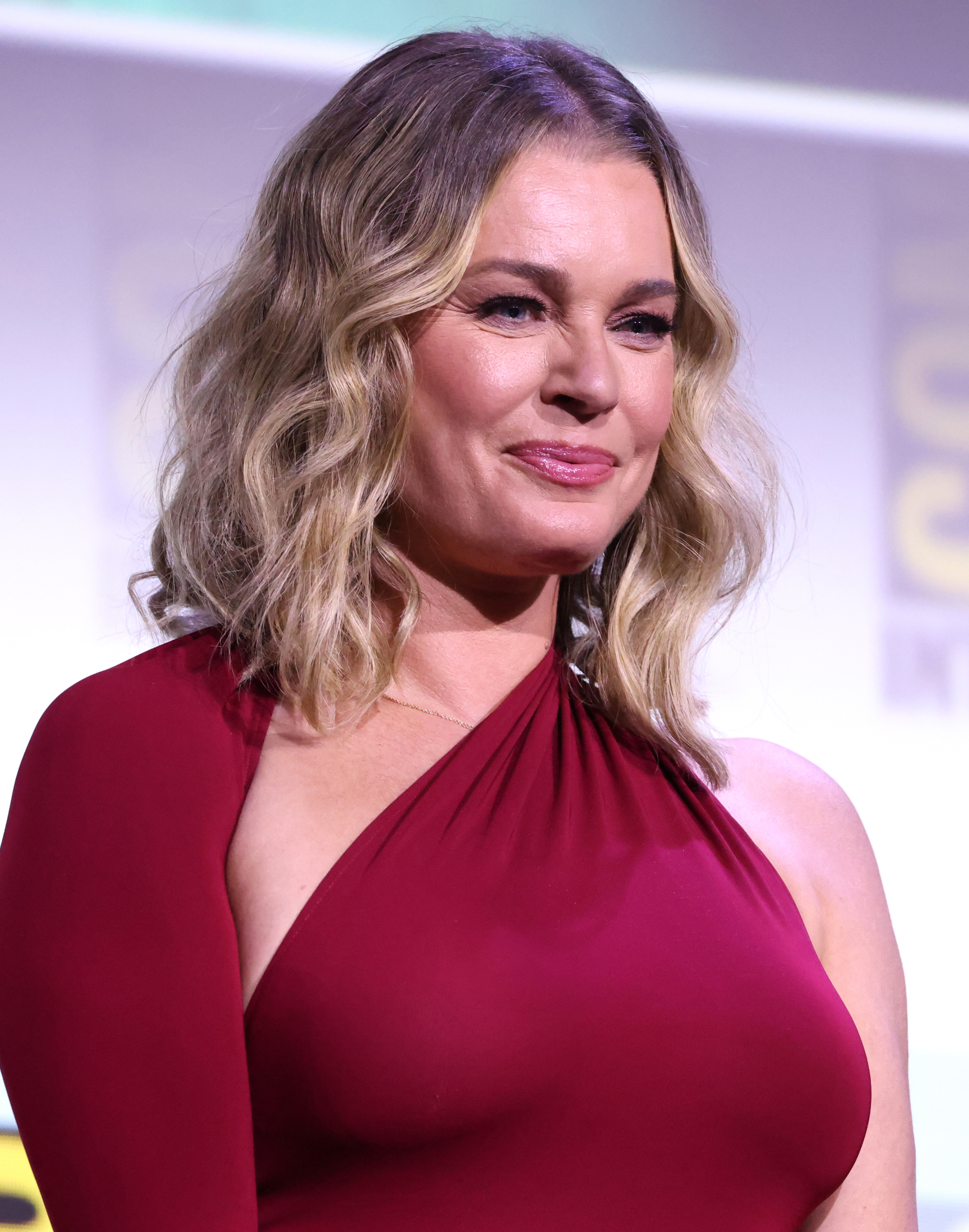
- Romijn at the 2025 San Diego Comic-Con
- Born: Rebecca Alie Romijn; November 6, 1972 (age 54); Berkeley, California, U.S.
- Other name: Rebecca Romijn-Stamos
- Education: University of California, Santa Cruz
- Occupations: Actress; former model
- Years active: 1988–present
- Height: 5 ft 11 in (180 cm)
- Spouses: John Stamos (m. 1998; div. 2005) Jerry O'Connell (m. 2007)
- Children: 2

Rebecca Alie Romijn (/roʊˈmeɪn/ roh-MAYN, Dutch: [roːˈmɛin]; born November 6, 1972) is an American actress and former model. She is known for her roles as Mystique in the X-Men film series (2000–2006; 2011; 2026) and as Una Chin-Riley on Star Trek: Discovery (2019) and Star Trek: Strange New Worlds (2022–present).

Romijn appeared in a number of films including Femme Fatale (2002) and The Punisher (2004) and has voiced Lois Lane in the DC Animated Movie Universe. She had recurring roles as Alexis Meade on the ABC television series Ugly Betty (2006–2009) and Eve Baird on the TNT series The Librarians (2014–2018). She also hosted the reality competition show Skin Wars (2014–2016).

== Early life ==
Rebecca Alie Romijn was born in Berkeley, California. Her mother was a community college instructor of English as a Second Language (ESL) and textbook author. Rebecca's father worked as a custom furniture maker. Her father is a native of Barneveld, the Netherlands, while her mother is an American of Dutch descent. Her mother met Rebecca's father as a teenager while living in the Netherlands on a student exchange program. Romijn's maternal grandfather, Henry Bernard Kuizenga, was a Presbyterian minister and seminary professor at Claremont School of Theology.

On The Ellen DeGeneres Show, when questioned about always being glamorous and beautiful, Romijn revealed that in her early teens she was an insecure "drama geek" and that, as a result of her growth spurt, she suffered from scoliosis and was in constant pain. Many sources say that she was once nicknamed the "Jolly Blonde Giant" because of her 5 feet 11 inches (1.80 m) height, but she has admitted to making that up "for a laugh". While studying music (voice) at the University of California, Santa Cruz, she became involved with fashion modeling and eventually moved to Paris, where she lived for more than three years.

== Career ==
Among other jobs, Romijn started her modeling career in 1991. She has appeared on the covers of American, French, Spanish, Russian and Swedish editions of Elle and Marie Claire; as well as American, Italian, Spanish, German, Portuguese, Russian, Greek, and Mexican editions of Cosmopolitan, Allure, Glamour, GQ, Esquire, and Sports Illustrated.

She has appeared in advertising campaigns for Escada, Christian Dior, La Perla, Tommy Hilfiger, Furla, Liz Claiborne, J. Crew, Victoria's Secret, bebe, La Senza, Dillard's, Pantene, Got Milk?, Miller Lite, and Maybelline. She has walked for Giorgio Armani, Sonia Rykiel, and Anna Molinari along with the likes of Claudia Schiffer, Stephanie Seymour, Karen Mulder, Kate Moss, Naomi Campbell, Linda Evangelista, Cindy Crawford, Helena Christensen and Christy Turlington. She was also the host of MTV's House of Style from 1998 to 2000. Romijn has been featured numerous times in annual lists of the world's most beautiful women by publications such as Maxim (2003–2007), AskMen.com (2001–2003, 2005–2006), and FHM (2000–2005). She appeared as a guest in the animated talk show Space Ghost Coast to Coast episode "Chinatown".

In 2000's X-Men, Romijn had her first major film role as Mystique; in 2002 she starred in Rollerball, a science fiction sports film directed by John McTiernan where she played Aurora, an athlete participant. Rebecca then returned to the role in 2003's sequel X2 and for X-Men: The Last Stand (2006). In these films, her costume consisted of blue makeup and strategically placed prosthetics on her otherwise nude body. In X2 she shows up in a bar in one scene in her "normal" look and in X-Men: The Last Stand, as a dark-haired "de-powered" Mystique. The role has since been recast with Jennifer Lawrence playing the younger version of the character. She had her first leading role in Brian De Palma's Femme Fatale (2002). She also has starred in films such as The Punisher and Godsend. She played the leading role in Pepper Dennis, a short-lived TV series on The WB.

In January 2007, Romijn made her first appearance on the ABC series Ugly Betty as a full-time regular cast member. She played Alexis Meade, a transgender woman and the sister of lead character Daniel Meade. In April 2008, it was reported that Romijn would only be appearing as a recurring character in Season 3 due to a change in direction by the writing staff (aligning with Romijn's pregnancy, which would have been inconsistent with her character's storyline). In November 2007, Romijn made a guest appearance on the ABC series Carpoolers, where she played the ex-wife of the character Laird, played by her real-life husband Jerry O'Connell.

Romijn starred in the ABC series Eastwick, reuniting her with her former Pepper Dennis co-star, Lindsay Price, before ABC canceled the show on November 9, 2009. She appears in an uncredited cameo in the 2011 feature film X-Men: First Class, appearing as an older version of the character played by Jennifer Lawrence. Romijn appeared as lab worker Jessie on the Adult Swim live-action show NTSF:SD:SUV:: for two seasons. Between June and September 2013, she starred in TNT's series King & Maxwell as Michelle Maxwell, a former Secret Service agent who works as a private investigator.

In addition to her film ventures, Romijn has also recorded music, performing a cover of Prince's "Darling Nikki" for the 2005 album Electro Goth Tribute to Prince. She was also featured on the song "Color Me Love" for RuPaul's eighth studio album Realness in 2015.

She starred as Eve Baird, the guardian of the eponymous group in The Librarians, a direct spin-off of The Librarian film series. She also hosted GSN's original series and reality show Skin Wars. In 2018 she voiced Lois Lane in the DC Animated Movie Universe. In 2019, she was a recurring guest in the second season of Star Trek: Discovery, playing the character of Una Chin-Riley, first officer of the USS Enterprise. She reprised the role in the spin-off series Star Trek: Strange New Worlds, which was released in 2022. She and husband O’Connell are currently the hosts of The Real Love Boat, which premiered October 5, 2022 on CBS.

In March 2025, it was announced that Romijn would return as Mystique in the Marvel Cinematic Universe film Avengers: Doomsday.

== Personal life ==
Romijn began dating actor John Stamos in 1994 after they met at a Victoria's Secret fashion show where she was modeling. They became engaged on Christmas Eve 1997 and married at the Beverly Hills Hotel on September 19, 1998. During the marriage, she used the name Rebecca Romijn-Stamos personally and professionally. They announced their separation in April 2004. Romijn started dating actor Jerry O'Connell, after Stamos' separation in the same month. Stamos filed for divorce in August 2004, and it became final on March 1, 2005.

Romijn and O'Connell became engaged in September 2005, and married at their home in Calabasas, California, on July 14, 2007. They have twin daughters, born on December 28, 2008.

Romijn resumed using her maiden name, but revealed in an August 2013 interview on Conan—after a Conan staff member noticed "Romijn-Stamos" on her driver's license—that she had never legally changed her name back from Romijn-Stamos.

== Filmography ==
=== Film ===
List of Rebecca Romijn film credits
Year	Title	Role	Notes
1998	Dirty Work	Bearded Lady	
1999	Austin Powers: The Spy Who Shagged Me	Herself	
2000	X-Men	Raven Darkhölme / Mystique	
2002	Femme Fatale	Laure Ash / Lily Watts	
2002	Rollerball	Aurora	
2002	Run Ronnie Run	Emily	
2002	Simone	Faith	
2003	X2	Raven Darkhölme / Mystique / Grace	
2004	Godsend	Jessie Duncan	
2004	The Punisher	Joan	
2006	The Alibi	Lola	
2006	Man About Town	Nina Giamoro	
2006	X-Men: The Last Stand	Raven Darkhölme / Mystique	
2008	Lake City	Jennifer	
2010	The Con Artist	Belinda	
2011	X-Men: First Class	Raven Darkhölme / Mystique	Uncredited cameo appearance
2012	Good Deeds	Heidi	
2014	Phantom Halo	Ms. Rose	
2015	Larry Gaye: Renegade Male Flight Attendant	Sally	
2018	The Death of Superman	Lois Lane	Voice role
2018	The Swinging Lanterns Stories	Malia	
2019	Satanic Panic	Danica Ross	
2019	Reign of the Supermen	Lois Lane	Voice role
2019	Batman: Hush	Lois Lane	Voice role
2020	Justice League Dark: Apokolips War	Lois Lane	Voice role
2021	Endangered Species	Lauren Halsey	
2026	Avengers: Doomsday †	Raven Darkhölme / Mystique (Earth-10005)	Post-production

=== Television ===
List of Rebecca Romijn television credits
Year	Title	Role	Notes
1997	Friends	Cheryl	Episode: "The One with the Dirty Girl"
1999	Hefner: Unauthorized	Kimberly Hefner	Television film
1999–2000	Just Shoot Me!	Adrienne Barker	8 episodes
2000	Jack & Jill	Paris Everett	Episode: "Starstruck"
2002	MADtv	Herself / Host	Episode: "#7.14"
2006	Pepper Dennis	Pepper Dennis	Main role; also co-producer
2007	Drawn Together	Charlotte	Voice, episode: "Charlotte's Web of Lies"
2007	Carpoolers	Joannifer	Episode: "A Divorce to Remember"
2007–2008	Ugly Betty	Alexis Meade	Main role
2009	Project Runway	Herself / Guest Judge	Episode: "We Expect Fashion"
2009–2010	Eastwick	Roxie Torcoletti	Main role
2011	Chuck	Robin Cunnings	Episode: "Chuck Versus the Curse"
2011	The Cleveland Show	Speaker / Graduate	Voice, episode: "Back to Cool"
2011	Possessing Piper Rose	Joanna Maxwell	Television film
2011	Special Agent Oso	Miss Garcia	Voice, episode: "Lost and Get Found/A View to the Truth"
2011–2012	NTSF:SD:SUV::	Jessie Nichols	Main role (seasons 1 & 2)
2013	Burning Love	Katie	2 episodes
2013	King & Maxwell	Michelle Maxwell	Main role
2014	The Pro	Margot	Television film
2014–2016	Skin Wars	Herself	Host / Judge
2014–2018	The Librarians	Eve Baird	Main role
2015	Adventure Time	The Empress	Voice role, 2 episodes
2015	Key & Peele	Pirate Captain	Episode: "Y'all Ready for This?"
2015	RuPaul's Drag Race	Herself	Guest judge; Episode: "Hello, Kitty Girls!"
2016	Gay for Play Game Show Starring RuPaul	Herself	Episode: "Featuring Rebecca Romijn"
2017	Love Locks	Lindsey Wilson	Television film
2018	Carter	Cassidy Lenox	Episode: "The Ring"
2019	Star Trek: Discovery	Number One	3 episodes
2019	Star Trek: Short Treks	Number One	2 episodes
2020	Curb Your Enthusiasm	Penelope	Episode: "The Surprise Party"
2022	The Real Love Boat	Herself	Host
2022–present	Star Trek: Strange New Worlds	Number One	Main role
2022–2023	The Ready Room	Herself	2 episodes

=== Other work ===
List of other Rebecca Romijn appearances, performances, and credits
Year	Title	Role	Notes
1988	New Kids on the Block: Please Don't Go Girl	Girl 1	Music video / video short
2003	Tron 2.0	Mercury	Voice, video game
2004	Tron 2.0: Killer App	Mercury	Voice, video game
2004	War Journal: On the Set of The Punisher	Herself	Documentary short; Credited as Rebecca Romijn-Stamos
2005	Trippin'	Herself	Television documentary; 2 episodes
2006	Wet Dreams	Herself	Documentary; Executive producer
2007	Becoming Ugly: A New Face for Television	Herself	Video short
2008	Speechless	Herself	Television documentary
2010	Worst Wedding DJ Ever	Herself	Video short
2012	Bettie Page Reveals All	Herself	Documentary; Actress & model
2012	The Producers	Ulla	Hollywood Bowl stage musical
2012	House of Style: Music, Models and MTV	Herself	Television documentary
2013	The Hand Bra by Rebecca Romijn	Herself	Video short
2014	Haunted House Hunters	Herself	Video short
2024	Pardon My Take	Award-Winning Listener	#1 Sports Podcast
