= Battle at the Binary Stars =

- Star Trek: Discovery episode
- Episode no.: Season 1 Episode 2
- Directed by: Adam Kane
- Story by: Bryan Fuller
- Teleplay by: Gretchen J. Berg; Aaron Harberts
- Cinematography by: Colin Hoult
- Editing by: Jon Dudkowski
- Original air date: September 24, 2017
- Running time: 39 minutes

Guest appearances
- Michelle Yeoh as Capt. Philippa Georgiou; Mary Chieffo as L'Rell; James Frain as Sarek; Kenneth Mitchell as Kol; Chris Obi as T'Kuvma; Terry Serpico as ADM Brett Anderson; Sam Vartholomeos as Danby Connor

Episode chronology
← Previous "The Vulcan Hello"	Next → "Context Is for Kings"
- Star Trek: Discovery season 1

"Battle at the Binary Stars" is the second episode of the first season of the American television series Star Trek: Discovery, which is set roughly a decade before the events of the original Star Trek series and shows the beginnings of the Federation–Klingon cold war. The episode was written by showrunners Gretchen J. Berg and Aaron Harberts, from a story by series co-creator Bryan Fuller, and was directed by Adam Kane.

Sonequa Martin-Green stars as Michael Burnham, the First Officer of the USS Shenzhou. Series regular Doug Jones also appears in the episode, which serves as the second in the series' two-part premiere that act as a prologue to the rest of the series, setting up a season-long story arc for Burnham. Guest starring for the two-part premiere are Michelle Yeoh as Philippa Georgiou, captain of the Shenzhou, and Chris Obi as the Klingon leader T'Kuvma.

"Battle at the Binary Stars" was released on CBS All Access on September 24, 2017, along with the previous episode. The two-part premiere was believed to have caused record subscriptions for All Access, and received mostly positive reviews from critics, particularly for Martin-Green's performance.

== Plot ==
After being raised as a Vulcan by Sarek, and becoming the first human to attend and graduate the Vulcan Learning Center and the Vulcan Science Academy, Michael Burnham is entrusted to Philippa Georgiou, captain of the USS Shenzhou, by Sarek. Seven years later, Burnham is the first officer of the Shenzhou, and has just disobeyed and attacked Georgiou in an attempt to fire, unprovoked, on a Klingon vessel, hoping to avoid an inevitable war. The Klingon outcast Voq, on behalf of his leader T'Kuvma, has just started a beacon that attracts 24 new Klingon vessels to the system, as Georgiou has Burnham imprisoned for mutiny.

The leaders of the 24 great houses question T'Kuvma's use of the beacon, which was prophesied to be used to unite the Klingon Empire once again. T'Kuvma is of a disgraced house, and the House of Kor leader Kol refuses to listen to him, especially given his acceptance of outcasts like Voq. T'Kuvma pleads with the other leaders to join him in fighting the United Federation of Planets, who he says intends to destroy their species' individuality. He predicts that reinforcements for the Shenzhou will soon arrive, and that they will announce that they "come in peace", and when these come to pass, the other leaders agree to fight.

The Starfleet ships take heavy fire, and the Shenzhou is almost destroyed, but is saved by the arrival of Admiral Brett Anderson and the USS Europa. T'Kuvma agrees to a ceasefire with Anderson, but then sends a large vessel, hidden with a cloaking device, to ram and destroy the Europa. The latter self-destructs, taking the large vessel with it. T'Kuvma proclaims himself Kahless, the ancient uniter, reborn, and allows the rest of Starfleet to escape as messengers of this. He sends the other Klingon leaders back to Qo'nos while he tends to their dead. In the damaged Shenzhou, Burnham escapes the brig after telepathic encouragement from Sarek, and convinces Georgiou to take T'Kuvma hostage.

After using a photon torpedo attached to a Klingon corpse to disable T'Kuvma's ship, Burnham and Georgiou board the ship and attack. Burnham fights off Voq, but Georgiou is killed by T'Kuvma. Burnham fatally shoots T'Kuvma, before being transported back to the Shenzhou. Voq promises the dying T'Kuvma that he will be revered for his services to the Klingons. Burnham is later court-martialed and sentenced to life in prison by Starfleet for her mutiny.

== Production ==
=== Development ===
On November 2, 2015, CBS announced a new Star Trek television series to premiere in January 2017, "on the heels" of the original series' 50th anniversary in 2016. In February 2016, Bryan Fuller was announced as the new series' showrunner, but was asked by CBS to step down at the end of October. Gretchen J. Berg and Aaron Harberts replaced him as showrunners. In June 2017, CBS announced that the series would now premiere on September 24, and on September 18, revealed that the second episode would be titled "Battle at the Binary Stars".

=== Writing ===
The teleplay for the episode was written by Berg and Harberts, based on a story by Fuller. The episode serves as the second of the season's two-part prologue, exploring protagonist Michael Burnham's initial actions on board the USS Shenzhou and her relationship with Captain Philippa Georgiou. The writers structured the season this way to avoid having to reveal this information in flashbacks during later events. It was always intended for Georgiou to die in the episode due to Burnham's actions, to set up the latter's story arc for the season in which she must contemplate and come to understand the consequences of her actions. Martin-Green described Georgiou's death as "the epitome of devastation. She’s not just my captain. She’s not just my mentor. She’s not just my teacher or my leader—she’s also my mother, in a sense. That’s one of those turning points. That’s one of those catastrophic events, one of those mortifying events, that changes the course of your life".

=== Casting ===
The series stars Sonequa Martin-Green as Michael Burnham, Doug Jones as Saru, Shazad Latif as Ash Tyler, Anthony Rapp as Paul Stamets, Mary Wiseman as Sylvia Tilly, and Jason Isaacs as Gabriel Lorca; only Martin-Green and Jones appear in this episode.

In November 2016, series' writer and consulting producer Nicholas Meyer mentioned that Michelle Yeoh had been cast in Discovery, and she was soon confirmed to be portraying Captain Georgiou of the USS Shenzhou. Three actors were cast as Klingons in December 2016: Latif as Kol, before he was recast to the role of Tyler; Chris Obi as T'Kuvma; and Mary Chieffo as L'Rell. Obi compared T'Kuvma to Moses, and said that the character was the "runt of the litter" who was transformed into a leader after believing that he had been tasked by the spirit of Kahless to unite the Klingon Empire. By January 2017, James Frain was cast as original series character Sarek, and the next month, several actors were cast as Starfleet officers, including Terry Serpico as Admiral Anderson and Sam Vartholomeos as Ensign Connor.

== Release ==
"Battle at the Binary Stars" was made available on CBS All Access on September 24, 2017. In Canada, it was broadcast on the specialty channels Space (English) and Z (French), also on September 24, before being streamed on CraveTV. In 188 other countries, the episode was released on Netflix within 24 hours of its U.S. debut.

=== Marketing ===
The CBS broadcast of the series' first episode featured advertisements from several technology companies, including Apple, Amazon, IBM, Motorola, Hewlett Packard Enterprise, and Samsung, with CBS charging a premium amount for advertisements during the "event". Several of the commercials focused on encouraging viewers to subscribe to All Access to see the next episode, and the rest of the series. These commercials focused on the different technologies through which All Access is available, such as Apple, Amazon or Roku. The first episode also ends with a cliffhanger, which CBS hoped would make viewers want to immediately start streaming this episode.

== Reception ==
=== Ratings and viewership ===
The episode's release on All Access led to record subscriptions for All Access, with the service's biggest day, week, and month of signups coming with the premiere. In Canada, the Space release of the episode was watched by 1.2 million viewers. By September 26, the episode was also the 19th most pirated video listed on The Pirate Bay.

=== Critical reception ===
The review aggregator website Rotten Tomatoes reported an 88% approval rating with an average rating of 7.49/10 based on 17 reviews. Darren Franich for Entertainment Weekly gave the two-part premiere a collective 'B' grade, praising Martin-Green's performance as the lead and the production design as well as commenting on the "undeniable appeal" of the "introduction of a new ship, the revelation that we're watching that ship's final voyage, the cliffhanger possibility that our new hero is a fallen angel." Writing for TVLine, Dave Nemetz graded the two episodes a 'B+', saying, "the nail-bitingly tense premiere delivered a cracking good action story, eye-popping special effects and a number of gasp-worthy twists" that was worth the wait. Chris Harnick at E! News considered Martin-Green's performance to be the strongest element of the show, praising her acting as a human raised in a Vulcan world as "the most interesting part of the series [which] presents a fascinating window into the world of Star Trek: Discovery."

Maureen Ryan of Variety gave muted praise, saying the series "has yet to prove itself a worthy successor to The Next Generation or Deep Space Nine. But there are reasons to hope that Discovery will be a promising addition to the Trek canon". USA Today's Bill Keveney gave the premiere 2-and-a-half out of four stars, saying it "soars in ambition and devotion to Star Trek history and mythology, but stalls with certain plot details and stilted dialogue". Merrill Barr of Forbes felt the show was "not bad, but it’s off to a strange start... [it] has every chance from here to become something great, possibly even awards worthy." Patrick Cooley of cleveland.com called the series "a bitter disappointment, plagued by bad dialogue, poor storytelling and wooden, bewilderingly stupid characters."
