= The Vulcan Hello =

- Star Trek: Discovery episode
- Episode no.: Season 1 Episode 1
- Directed by: David Semel
- Story by: Bryan Fuller; Alex Kurtzman
- Teleplay by: Bryan Fuller; Akiva Goldsman
- Cinematography by: Guillermo Navarro
- Editing by: Jon Dudkowski
- Original air date: September 24, 2017
- Running time: 44 minutes

Guest appearances
- Michelle Yeoh as Cpt. Philippa Georgiou; Mary Chieffo as L'Rell; James Frain as Sarek; Chris Obi as T'Kuvma; Maulik Pancholy as CMO Dr. Anton Nambue; Terry Serpico as ADM Brett Anderson; Sam Vartholomeos as Danby Connor

Episode chronology
← Previous —	Next → "Battle at the Binary Stars"
- Star Trek: Discovery season 1

"The Vulcan Hello" is the series premiere of the American television series Star Trek: Discovery, which is set roughly a decade before the events of the original Star Trek series and shows the beginnings of the Federation–Klingon cold war. It was written by Akiva Goldsman and Bryan Fuller, from a story by series creators Fuller and Alex Kurtzman, and was directed by David Semel.

Sonequa Martin-Green stars as Michael Burnham, the First Officer of the USS Shenzhou. Series regular Doug Jones also appears in the episode, the first in the series' two-part premiere that act as a prologue to the rest of the series. Guest starring for the two-part premiere are Michelle Yeoh as Philippa Georgiou, captain of the Shenzhou, and Chris Obi as Klingon leader T'Kuvma. Filming took place at Pinewood Toronto Studios, on location in Jordan, and at Paramount Studios.

The episode aired on CBS on September 24, 2017, in a special preview broadcast, before being released on the streaming service CBS All Access (along with the second episode, and the rest of the series in subsequent weeks). The episode was seen by 9.5 million viewers on CBS, and led to record subscriptions for All Access. It received positive reviews, particularly for Martin-Green's performance, though some of the writing was criticized.

== Plot ==
A group of Klingons rally around their leader, T'Kuvma, who follows the teachings of the ancient Klingon leader Kahless, and preaches against the actions of the United Federation of Planets.

On a relatively primitive planet, Captain Philippa Georgiou and First Officer Michael Burnham of the USS Shenzhou open a well, enabling the planet's residents to survive a coming 89-year drought.

On Stardate 1207.3 (May 11, 2256), the crew of the Shenzhou investigate a damaged interstellar relay in deep space and discover an unidentified object. Without a clear reading of the object, cautious Kelpien Science Officer Saru advises leaving the area. Burnham disagrees, and dons a space suit to investigate in spite of the dangerous radiation from a nearby binary star system. She finds the object to be covered in ancient carvings, and guarded by an armed Klingon. The Klingon attacks, and when she uses her suit to escape she accidentally kills him. Burnham later awakens aboard the Shenzhou being treated for acute radiation sickness.

The Klingons hold a memorial service for their dead comrade, a "Torchbearer". Burnham warns Georgiou of her encounter with the Klingon, and though Saru suggests that she is confused due to her injuries, Georgiou believes her and locks weaponry on the object. T'Kuvma was expecting this, and reveals their cloaked vessel. The Klingons debate attacking the Federation ship, but T'Kuvma is looking to fulfill an ancient prophecy by having the Torchbearer light a beacon and unite the great Klingon houses. Voq, an outcast with no house of his own, volunteers to be the new Torchbearer, and "lights the beacon", sending light and signals from the carved object.

Starfleet orders the Shenzhou to wait until reinforcements arrive. Burnham contacts her adoptive father Sarek, who believes that the Klingons must have a new leader who could be looking to bring order to the Klingon Empire, which has been in disarray for centuries. He also explains that his species earned the respect of the Klingons by firing on them first whenever they met. Burnham recommends this action to Georgiou, but the captain refuses. Burnham disables Georgiou with a Vulcan nerve pinch and takes command of the ship, ordering an attack on the Klingon vessel. Georgiou recovers in time to stop the attack, just as several more Klingon vessels arrive.

== Production ==
=== Development ===
On November 2, 2015, CBS announced a new Star Trek television series to premiere in January 2017, "on the heels" of the original series' 50th anniversary in 2016. In February 2016, Bryan Fuller was announced as the new series' showrunner and co-creator alongside Alex Kurtzman. In July, at Star Trek's 50th anniversary San Diego Comic-Con panel, Fuller announced the series' title to be Star Trek: Discovery. At the end of that month, CBS hired David Semel, a veteran television procedural director who was under an overall deal with the studio, to direct the first episode of Discovery. This was a decision that Fuller was not happy with, believing that Semel "was wrong for the job". Fuller wanted a more visionary director, and had personally reached out to Edgar Wright to direct the episode before CBS hired Semel.

As development and pre-production continued, Fuller and Semel "clashed" on the direction of the show. By August 2016, Fuller had hired Gretchen J. Berg and Aaron Harberts, who he had worked with on Pushing Daisies, to serve as co-showrunners with him. A month later, Fuller and Kurtzman had asked CBS to delay the series' release so they could meet the high expectations for the series, and the studio announced that the series premiere had been pushed back to May 2017. At the end of October, CBS asked Fuller to step down as showrunner, with Berg and Harberts being made sole showrunners and working off of a broad story arc and overall mythology established by Fuller. In June 2017, CBS announced a new premiere date of September 24. On September 18, CBS revealed that the first episode would be titled "The Vulcan Hello".

=== Writing ===
The teleplay for the episode was written by Fuller and supporting producer Akiva Goldsman, based on a story by Fuller and Kurtzman. The title refers to a story told by the character Sarek to the protagonist Michael Burnham, explaining that Vulcans earned the respect of the Klingons by greeting them in their own "language", by firing weapons on sight. The episode serves as the first of the season's two-part prologue, exploring Burnham's initial actions on board the USS Shenzhou and her relationship with Captain Philippa Georgiou. The writers structured the season this way to avoid having to reveal this information in flashbacks during later events. It was important for Fuller and Kurtzman, when they were developing the story of the episode, to "present both sides of the argument" by exploring both the Starfleet and Klingon perspectives, with the conflict taking inspiration from a global trend of isolationism. This episode ends with a cliffhanger, which CBS hoped would make viewers want to immediately start streaming the second episode.

=== Casting ===
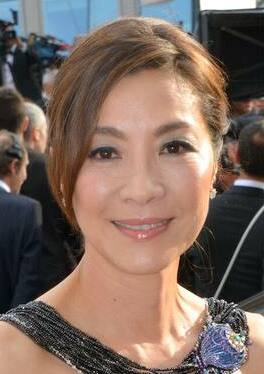
Michelle Yeoh guest stars as USS Shenzhou Captain Philippa Georgiou.

The series stars Sonequa Martin-Green as Burnham, Doug Jones as Saru, Shazad Latif as Ash Tyler, Anthony Rapp as Paul Stamets, Mary Wiseman as Sylvia Tilly, and Jason Isaacs as Gabriel Lorca; only Martin-Green and Jones appear in this episode.

In November 2016, series' writer and consulting producer Nicholas Meyer mentioned that Michelle Yeoh had been cast in Discovery, and she was soon confirmed to be portraying Captain Georgiou of the USS Shenzhou. Yeoh described the character as an explorer who "loved the universe" and particularly "the possibility of seeing new stars", but also someone who "has seen the horrors of war". She felt that though the relationship between Georgiou and Burnham was professional, it was also "multilayered" and included a "mother/daughter" dynamic. Yeoh chose to retain her Chinese Malaysian accent for the role, and also chose her own decorations for Georgiou's ready room, including Malaysian puppets and a bottle of Chateau Picard wine (a reference to Captain Jean-Luc Picard of Star Trek: The Next Generation).

Three actors were cast as Klingons in December 2016: Latif as Kol, before he was recast to the role of Tyler; Chris Obi as T'Kuvma; and Mary Chieffo as L'Rell. For the scenes where he had to speak the Klingon language, Obi was inspired by Martin-Green who told him that the language was "deep inside" him, and after listening to recordings made for him by a Klingon expert, Obi looked to make the lines his own on set. It took three hours to apply his make-up. By January 2017, James Frain was cast as Sarek, a character who was first portrayed by Mark Lenard in the original Star Trek series. The next month, three actors were cast as Starfleet officers: Terry Serpico as Admiral Anderson, Maulik Pancholy as Dr. Nambue, and Sam Vartholomeos as Ensign Connor. Vartholomeos described Connor as "Starfleet through and through," and added, "when someone goes against Starfleet or contradicts Starfleet, Connor's wires get crossed."

=== Filming ===
"It was like shooting a movie, the scale of it. It wasn't just 'Quick, let's get the shot. Move, move.'"

— Guest actress Michelle Yeoh on filming the episode

The series began filming at Pinewood Toronto Studios on January 24, 2017, with Guillermo Navarro serving as cinematographer on the first episode. By mid-May 2017, production on the episode had been completed, including filming for scenes set on a desert planet which had taken place on location in Jordan. The producers worked closely with Semel to make the series look as cinematic as possible, including filming the bridge of Starfleet's ships in such a way as "not to shoot in a sort of proscenium box... to be able to get the camera into spaces where, you know, to shoot it in interesting ways, which is a combination of choreographing a scene to motivate the camera moving, and also lighting." They also devised a way with Navarro to contour the lighting on set to make the series look even more cinematic but not make the audience have to "squint your eyes to see what was happening."

Additional filming for the episode took place at Paramount Studios, to create Burnham's flight through space from the Shenzhou to the Klingon beacon. The sequence was first pre-visualized with anamatics by Pixomondo, which Semel described as being very specific and illustrating what every shot of the sequence would be. Martin-Green was then filmed in front of a green screen on a wire rig, which was maneuvered to create a sense of weightlessness. Semel was inspired for some of the movements by scuba divers. The long haul space suit worn by Martin-Green in the sequence weighed 25 pounds (11 kg), and was built in the United Kingdom from high-density foam covered in fiberglass.

== Release ==
"The Vulcan Hello" premiered at the ArcLight Hollywood on September 19, 2017. It then aired in a "preview broadcast" on CBS in the United States on September 24, and was made available with the next episode on CBS All Access. In Canada, it was broadcast on the CTV Television Network and the specialty channels Space (English) and Z (French), also on September 24, before being streamed on CraveTV. In 188 other countries, the episode was released on Netflix within 24 hours of its U.S. debut.

On the launch of the Paramount+ streaming service, on March 4, 2021, a one day only free Star Trek marathon was presented, featuring the first episodes of the various Star Trek television series, including "The Vulcan Hello". The marathon started at 7 am PT/10 am ET and was Live streamed on the YouTube internet video platform, going through each first episode chronologically in order of release with "Vulcan Hello" airing after "Broken Bow".

=== Marketing ===
The first footage from the episode was released in a trailer in May 2017. Chris Harnick of E! News described the trailer as "gorgeous" and "truly cinematic", and because of the appearances of Sarek and the Klingons in the footage, "this is the Star Trek you know and love." Aja Romano at Vox called the trailer's visuals "sumptuous" and "modern, but still very much in keeping with the aesthetic of previous Trek series". She continued, "What gets short shrift in this trailer is the series' overarching plot". The night before the episode debuted, a model of the USS Discovery was flown above the Hudson River on Manhattan's west side. Created by Remarkable Media, the 50 feet (15 m) rig consisted of a truss skeleton covered in LEDs, and was suspended from a Black Hawk helicopter.

As part of the marketing campaign for the episode, CBS chose to embargo any reviews for the episode until after its broadcast. This is usually seen as a sign that the studio expects the product to receive unfavorable reviews, but CBS Interactive COO Marc DeBevoise stated that the decision was made as part of an attempt to prevent spoilers from leaking online, and to not "have too much out there before [fans are] able to see it", which was felt to be particularly important for the Star Trek franchise due to its "deep fan focus".

== Reception ==
=== Ratings and viewership ===
According to Nielsen Media Research, the CBS broadcast was watched by 7 percent of adults 18–49 watching television at the time, 1.9 percent of the group in total. With 9.5 million total viewers, Screener's Rick Porter characterized the debut as "decent", particularly due to its off-set start time and competition with NBC Sunday Night Football. The Space release in Canada was watched by 1.17 million viewers, and an additional million viewers watched the broadcast on CTV. The episode also saw the most viewers of any series debut on CraveTV. By September 27, the episode was also the 12th most pirated video listed on The Pirate Bay.

The CBS broadcast featured advertisements from several technology companies, including Apple, Amazon, IBM, Motorola, Hewlett Packard Enterprise, and Samsung, with CBS charging a premium amount for advertisements during the "event". Several of the commercials focused on encouraging viewers to subscribe to All Access to see the next episode, and the rest of the series. These commercials focused on the different technologies through which All Access is available, such as Apple, Amazon or Roku. The episode's broadcast led to record subscriptions for All Access, with the service's biggest day, week, and month of signups coming with the premiere.

=== Critical reception ===
The review aggregator website Rotten Tomatoes reported a 100% approval rating with an average rating of 8.35/10 based on 22 reviews. Writing for TVLine, Dave Nemetz graded the episode a 'B+', saying, "the nail-bitingly tense premiere delivered a cracking good action story, eye-popping special effects and a number of gasp-worthy twists" that was worth the wait. Darren Franich for Entertainment Weekly gave the two-part premiere a collective 'B' grade, praising Martin-Green's performance as the lead and the production design as well as commenting on the "undeniable appeal" of the "introduction of a new ship, the revelation that we're watching that ship's final voyage, the cliffhanger possibility that our new hero is a fallen angel." Zack Handlen at The A.V. Club scored the episode a 'B+' grade. While noting some of the "clumsy writing" in the episode, he felt it was "thrilling, moving, and frequently unexpected. Just as importantly, for everything questionable about the design, it still feels like Trek."

Vulture's Matt Zoller Seitz gave a positive review, referring to the episode as "wonderstruck, overstuffed, corny and stirring" and feeling it "stands tall alongside the best-regarded incarnations of the Trek franchise... with an almost entirely new slate of characters... and casts them with actors you can't help but like even when they're getting on your last nerve." At Vox, Emily St. James also gave a very positive review, feeling that the episodes had "all the strengths and flaws of classic Trek" and praising Burnham as the protagonist: "the best thing about Discovery is that Michael Burnham, played beautifully by Martin-Green, does stuff. She gets in trouble. She breaks rules. She violates Starfleet protocol. She has emotions that get the best of her, even as she knows they shouldn't. She is, in other words, very human". She also praised the characters' relationships and the addition of Saru. Writing for E! News, Chris Harnick considered Martin-Green's performance to be the strongest element of the show, praising her acting as a human raised in a Vulcan world by saying as "the most interesting part of the series [which] presents a fascinating window into the world of Star Trek: Discovery."

Maureen Ryan of Variety gave muted praise, saying the series "has yet to prove itself a worthy successor to The Next Generation or Deep Space Nine. But there are reasons to hope that Discovery will be a promising addition to the Trek canon". USA Today's Bill Keveney gave the premiere 2-and-a-half out of four stars, saying it "soars in ambition and devotion to Star Trek history and mythology, but stalls with certain plot details and stilted dialogue". Merrill Barr of Forbes felt the show was "not bad, but it's off to a strange start... [it] has every chance from here to become something great, possibly even awards worthy." Patrick Cooley of cleveland.com called the series "a bitter disappointment, plagued by bad dialogue, poor storytelling and wooden, bewilderingly stupid characters." In 2017, GameSpot ranked this as the number one best pilot episode of a Star Trek series to-date. They impressed with character design of Burnham, and of having a show where the main character is not the captain.

... The show is told from the perspective of First Officer Michael Burnham, and not the ship's Captain. She is also a human with a vast amount of Vulcan knowledge because she was raised by Vulcans. That's just brilliant.

— Gamespot, 2017

=== Accolades ===
Year	Award	Category	Recipient	Result
2018	Visual Effects Society Awards	Outstanding Visual Effects in a Photoreal Episode	Jason Michael Zimmerman, Aleksandra Kochoska, Ante Dekovic and Mahmoud Rahnama	Nominated
2018	Visual Effects Society Awards	Outstanding Compositing in a Photoreal Episode	Phil Prates, Rex Alerta, John Dinh and Karen Cheng	Nominated
