= Philippa Georgiou =

Character in the Star Trek franchise

Captain Georgiou Empress Georgiou
- Star Trek character
- Yeoh as Georgiou
- First appearance: "The Vulcan Hello" (2017)
- Created by: Bryan Fuller; Gretchen J. Berg; Aaron Harberts
- Portrayed by: Michelle Yeoh

In-universe information
- Full name: "Her most Imperial Majesty, Mother of the Fatherland, Overlord of Vulcan, Dominus of Kronos, Regina Andor, Philippa Georgiou Augustus Iaponius Centarius"
- Species: Human/Terran
- Gender: Female
- Title(s): Captain; Emperess
- Occupation: Captain; Empress; Spy
- Affiliation: USS Shenzhou; United Federation of Planets; Starfleet; Terran Empire; USS Discovery; Section 31
- Planet: Earth
- Born: 2202

Philippa Georgiou, portrayed by Michelle Yeoh, is a fictional character in the Star Trek franchise. First appearing in "The Vulcan Hello", the pilot episode of Star Trek: Discovery, Yeoh features as a major member of the recurring cast during the first three seasons of the series, and is credited in the main titles as a "special guest star" during each of the episodes she appears in. The character is introduced as Captain Philippa Georgiou, the respected captain of the USS Shenzhou and a maternal figure to series protagonist Michael Burnham (played by Sonequa Martin-Green).

Beginning in "The Wolf Inside", the eleventh episode of the show's first season, Yeoh portrays an alternate version of Georgiou from the Mirror Universe, Terran Empress Philippa Georgiou Augustus Iaponius Centarius, a despotic and ruthless emperor of the Terran Empire. The character makes her final appearance of the series in "Terra Firma", the two-part ninth and tenth episodes of Discovery season three. Yeoh reprised the role in the 2025 film Star Trek: Section 31.

== Casting and characterization ==
In November 2016, it was rumored that Yeoh had been cast in Star Trek: Discovery, which was later confirmed by series writer and consulting producer Nicholas Meyer. Initial reports indicated that she would appear as a character named "Han Bo" who, at the time, was rumored to be one of two female leads in Star Trek: Discovery, and was captain of the Shenzhou. The character was later renamed Philippa Georgiou. Discussing the character, Yeoh described Georgiou as an explorer who "loved the universe" and particularly "the possibility of seeing new stars", but also someone who "has seen the horrors of war". She felt that, while the relationship between Georgiou and protagonist Burnham was professional, it was also "multilayered" and included a "mother/daughter" dynamic.

Yeoh chose to retain her Chinese Malaysian accent for the role, and also chose her own decorations for Georgiou's ready room, including Malaysian puppets and a bottle of Chateau Picard wine (a reference to Captain Jean-Luc Picard of Star Trek: The Next Generation). She explained that, while preparing to take on the role, she worked closely with showrunners Aaron Harberts and Gretchen J. Berg, pilot director David Semel, and writer Ted Sullivan to get a feel for the character and to understand some of Georgiou's backstory. Yeoh described her as a "very compassionate person" despite her experiences of war and conflict and that her belief in the "goodness of humanity" is what drew her to the part.

=== Name and titles ===
When the Terran emperor is revealed to be the Mirror Universe version of Georgiou, her full title is stated as "Her Most Imperial Majesty, Mother of the Fatherland, Overlord of Vulcan, Dominus of Kronos, Regina Andor, Philippa Georgiou Augustus Iaponius Centarius". Jordon Nardino, who wrote the first season's twelfth episode "Vaulting Ambition", explained his creative process behind Georgiou's full name and titles in this universe, noting that a lot of the Terran Empire was inspired by the Roman Empire, the names of their emperors, and information he gleaned from the book SPQR: A History of Ancient Rome by Mary Beard. Nardino stated that Mother of the Fatherland is a play on "Father of the fatherland", and that the remainder of Georgiou's titles are based on worlds conquered by the Terrans. Regarding Emperor Georgiou's many names, Nardino stated that "Augustus" was selected because the Terrans see themselves as inheritors of the Roman Empire so their Emperors take the title of Rome's first Emperor. "Iaponius" (the Greek word for Japanese), is a reference to Hoshi Sato (played by Linda Park), a character who appeared in Star Trek: Enterprise who named herself empress of the Terran Empire, with Nardino believing that Georgiou would have chosen this to connect the two characters in some way despite Georgiou being Chinese-Malaysian like Yeoh. "Centaurius" was chosen to reflect the first system colonised by the Terrans.

== Development ==
Even during production of Discovery's first season, Yeoh expressed interest in starring in a spinoff series focusing on Georgiou to executive producer Alex Kurtzman, noting that she loved playing the character and wanted to be a role model to other Asian women. While Kurtzman was enthusiastic, he was unsure at the time whether this would be feasible since Discovery had yet to be released. Following positive feedback to Yeoh's character, the writers began exploring the Starfleet black ops organization Section 31 as part of her storyline during season two, leading to further discussions around a potential spinoff. After becoming showrunner of Discovery, Kurtzman signed a five year deal with CBS Studios to expand the Star Trek franchise, and Yeoh was in talks to star in the proposed spinoff in November 2018.

Kurtzman attached Discovery writers Bo Yeon Kim and Erika Lippoldt as showrunners for the spinoff, while they were working on Discovery's second season, with production expected to begin following the completion of Discovery season three. Kurtzman gave a prospective release date of 2021 or 2022 for the Georgiou series, with Yeoh confirming her involvement in December 2019. Filming of the series was delayed due to Yeoh starring in Shang-Chi and the Legend of the Ten Rings and by the COVID-19 pandemic. Georgiou was written out of Discovery during the third season episode "Terra Firma", which was co-written by Kim and Lippoldt, who stated that they had crafted her final episodes with a "lot of care" and set them up as a backdoor pilot for the spinoff. In 2022, Kurtzman reiterated that the show was still happening due to the already-completed scripts, but would likely have to wait until one of the five ongoing series at the time had concluded.

In March 2023, Kurtzman announced that the spinoff would instead be moving forward as an "event film", and explained that he had begun converting the scripts in mid-2022 once he realized that Yeoh could potentially win an Oscar for her role in Everything Everywhere All at Once which would limit her schedule. Yeoh subsequently won the Academy Award for Best Actress, and the film, Star Trek: Section 31 began filming in January 2024 following the conclusion of the 2023 Writers Guild of America strike and 2023 SAG-AFTRA strike.

== Appearances ==
=== Star Trek: Discovery ===
==== Season one ====
Prior to the beginning of the series, Captain Georgiou was given command of the USS Shenzhou and visited the planet Vulcan, where she recruited Michael Burnham as her First Officer at the request of Burnham's adoptive father Sarek, with whom Georgiou was previously acquainted. As a captain, Georgiou fosters a relaxed and encouraging environment on the Shenzhou and enjoys a friendly rivalry with her crew while still knowing when to set boundaries and assert her authority appropriately. In 2256, Georgiou and Burnham journey to the homeworld of a pre-spaceflight species, the Crepusculans, in an effort to prevent a drought that would wipe out their civilization. Following this, the Shenzhou is dispatched to a binary star system to investigate a damaged relay. Burnham identifies an unknown object of Klingon origin, though Georgiou is reluctant to believe this. A Klingon ship then arrives and Georgiou stands by Starfleet orders to not engage despite Burnham's protests. Burnham ultimately mutinies and disables Georgiou with a Vulcan nerve pinch, but she quickly recovers and orders her to be taken to the brig as a whole fleet of Klingon vessels arrive in the system.

When Klingon leader T'Kuvma makes contact, he reveals that Burnham murdered one of his warriors and, despite Georgiou's asserting that the Federation comes in peace, T'Kuvma rallies his fleet to attack, causing significant damage to the Shenzhou and leading Georgiou to order a full evacuation of the ship. Based on the suggestion of officer Saru, Georgiou resolves to transport a proton warhead onto the Klingon flagship using the corpse of one of their warriors. Burnham, who survives the damage dealt to the brig, warns her that killing T'Kuvma would turn him into a martyr, and advises capturing him instead. Reeling from Burnham's mutiny, Georgiou berates herself for thinking she was ready for a command position; she states that Burnham's Vulcan upbringing has clouded her humanity. Despite this, she allows Burnham to join her on the flagship, where Georgiou engages T'Kuvma in hand-to-hand combat. Though she fights valiantly, Georgiou is killed. Burnham is unable to recover her body before being transported back to the Shenzhou. Six months after Georgiou's death, Burnham receives her last will and testament, which includes a final holographic message and her prized telescope, which she bequeaths to Burnham.

Some time later, following a navigation error involving Paul Stamets and the experimental spore drive technology, the USS Discovery finds itself in the Mirror Universe. Posing as her mirror universe counterpart, Burnham is shocked to discover that the tyrannical Terran Empire is ruled by the mirror version of Philippa Georgiou. Burnham confesses to Discovery captain Gabriel Lorca that she is afraid about confronting the Terran Emperor due to her guilt over betraying the prime universe's Georgiou. Burnham comes face to face with Georgiou, who orders Lorca to be locked away and tortured for the rest of his life. She invites Burnham for dinner, expressing her happiness that her Burnham did not die hunting him down. In private, Georgiou holds a knife to Burnham, stating that she knows that Burnham had conspired with Lorca to assassinate her, and orders her to be publicly killed. Burnham then reveals that she is from another universe, and Georgiou demands to know how they crossed over to her universe. From Georgiou's description of the mirror Lorca and his sensitivity to light - which he had displayed but attributed to an eye injury that he refused treatment for - Burnham eventually realizes that the Lorca that has been in charge of Discovery is actually the mirror Lorca, who had been on the run since conspiring against Georgiou.

Resuming his coup against her, Lorca kills a large group of Georgiou's guards, leading her to hide in her quarters with a special bracelet that blocks her life signs from appearing on sensors. Hatching a plan, Burnham and Georgiou pretend to surrender and then take out Lorca's loyalists. Georgiou then kills Lorca with her sword and, finally feeling kinship with the prime universe Burnham, offers to hold off Lorca's remaining forces and buy her time to flee back to the Discovery. Desperate to save her, Burnham grabs Georgiou as the transporter beam initializes and takes them both to the ship as it crosses back into the prime universe. Furious at being denied an honorable death, Georgiou demands to return to the mirror universe, but Burnham insists to Starfleet command that she be granted political asylum and they assert to use her knowledge of conquest to ascertain how to defeat the Klingons and end the war. To Burnham, she recommends attacking the planetary defense systems of their homeworld of Qo'noS, while privately admitting to Sarek that a bomb destroying the planet would end things once and for all, stating that she would do this in exchange for freedom from Starfleet. On Qo'noS, Georgiou plants a hydro bomb into one of the volcanoes but is prevented from committing genocide by Burnham, who gives the detonator to their ally L'Rell so she can force the Klingons to unify under her leadership and end the war. Georgiou then leaves, with Burnham warning her that she better not do anything to make Starfleet come after her.

==== Season two ====
Months later, Georgiou rescues L'Rell and her lover Ash Tyler from an attack by a rebellious Klingon group. She maintains her cover, stating that she is a retired Starfleet captain assigned to ensure L'Rell remains in power, privately advising her to send Tyler and their baby away so they cannot be used against her. While smuggling Tyler and the child, Georgiou reveals herself to be an agent of the secret service agency Section 31 and invites Tyler to join them. While searching for a missing Spock, Burnham and Discovery's new captain Christopher Pike identify a shuttle which is carrying Georgiou, who states that Section 31 have also tasked her with tracking down Spock. Section 31 boss Leland takes Spock into custody and plans to use a life-threatening memory extraction device on him, so Georgiou disables the cameras, allowing Burnham to rescue him and take him to Discovery. When Burnham asks why she would do this, Georgiou indicated that making Leland look bad would be good for her. When he confronts her, Georgiou informs him that he is no longer in charge and that she knows he is responsible for killing Burnham's biological parents.

When Burnham and Discovery successfully capture the illusive "Red Angel", who is revealed to be a time travelling version of Burnham's mother Gabrielle, Leland orders Georgiou and Tyler to prevent their attempt to allow Gabrielle to remain in the present, handing Georgiou a device that will steal her and Discovery's data before self-destructing and killing her. While the data upload is occurring, Gabrielle tells Georgiou that she is aware that she is from the mirror universe, and that she has seen her sacrifice herself for Burnham in the future. Before she leaves, Gabrielle asks Georgiou to make a promise "mother to mother" that she will protect Burnham, and tells Georgiou that she is unable to do this herself because she must keep the data safe from Control, a malicious artificial intelligence. A phrase Gabrielle uses leads Georgiou to realize that Leland has been taken over by Control. She confronts him and they engage in combat, buying enough time for Gabrielle to flee into the timestream with the data, though Leland/Control escapes to the Section 31 ship before he could be killed.

Leland/Control eventually hunts down Discovery, intent on finding the data so that Control can use it to end all organic life. Georgiou arrives on the Discovery to assist, and condemns Burnham's plan to send herself into the future to ensure Control never receives the data. Before heading to the USS Enterprise, Pike tells Georgiou that, while he doesn't know what to make of her, he is glad they are on the same side. Georgiou then confesses that she is secretly from the mirror universe, leading Pike to wink and respond "what mirror universe?" before being transported away. The Discovery and Enterprise then prepare to battle with Leland/Control's Section 31 fleet, and Georgiou mocks Leland, noting that everyone hates him, but he responded by unleashing a host of new ships to greatly outnumber those of Starfleet. Georgiou encourages Saru to invite Leland on board so she can get her revenge and, though Saru refuses, Leland is able to take advantage of Discovery's shields being down to transport himself onto the bridge, shooting several crew members before locking himself in the science lab with the date. Georgiou successfully hacks the door panel and joins forces with security officer Nhan to "make him scream". The two women pursue Leland through the ship, engaging him in brutal combat before Georgiou is able to imprison him in the reactor room for the spore drive. She then magnetizes it, gleefully telling him that it will be painful and watching as Leland is killed and Control is neutralized. Despite this, Burnham is adamant that the data be ferried to the future to keep it safe from being searched for again, and Georgiou, along with several members of the Discovery crew, agree to join her.

==== Season three ====
The Discovery travels to 3189 and crash lands on a local planet, where Georgiou tells Nhan that she remained on the ship to avoid being stuck with Section 31. Against orders, Georgiou follows Saru and ensign Sylvia Tilly when they go to gather supplies to help repair the ship, and saves them from a group of local mercenaries, though she is prevented from killing them by Saru. Reuniting with Burnham, who had been on her own in the future for a year, Georgiou notes that Burnham seems uncomfortable to be back in her Starfleet uniform and predicts that she has outgrown the Federation now that she is used to living by her own rules. The Discovery reunites with the remains of Starfleet, which was decimated by a mysterious event known as "the Burn", and their scanners immediately identify her as a Terran and proves unfazed by the holographic interrogators. After disabling the holograms, an elderly Starfleet officer tells Georgiou he has been fascinated by the Terran Empire since he was a boy, but reveals that it fell some time ago, a revelation with rattles her. He adds that the prime and mirror universes have gradually separated over time and that no one has crossed between them in over five hundred years, meaning she is truly alone. Back on Discovery, Burnham finds Georgiou standing but unresponsive, something she brushes off when Burnham is finally able to rouse her.

Burnham later recruits Georgiou for an unsanctioned mission to rescue her lover Cleveland Booker from a planet run by crime syndicate The Emerald Chain, with Georgiou posing as a wealthy weapons dealer and Burnham her assistant. While en route, Georgiou has visions from the mirror universe of herself over a bloodied body bag and Burnham notices Georgiou freeze again, but her concerns are dismissed. Burnham and Georgiou's cover is eventually blown and they allow themselves to get captured so that Booker and the Emerald Chain's slaves can use the distraction to escape. While Burnham and Georgiou fight their captors, Georgiou is incapacitated by another vision and only comes to just in time to save Burnham from being killed. Once they return to Discovery, Georgiou admits to Burnham that she does not know what is happening to her. Eventually encouraged to seek support from Dr. Culber, she allows him to complete his tests but later steals one of the electrodes and finds out she is dying.

Dr. Culber reveals that time travel can cause a person's molecules to become unstable but, since Georgiou is additionally from a different dimension that is drifting further and further from the prime universe, she is experience an unprecedented impact on her health and that her condition is rapidly deteriorating. Culber warns the others not to tell Georgiou that her death is imminent, as she will attempt to find an honorable death in battle. Georgiou rebuffs attempts from the crew to help her with basic tasks that she is now struggling to complete. Culber tells Burnham and Georgiou that the Sphere data has indicated that a potential cure is on the planet Dannus V, but that the possibility of it working is only around five percent, and Burnham promises not to hesitate in killing Georgiou if the cure is unsuccessful. Georgiou and Burnham spar and Burnham convinces her that the only way she will find honor is to face her fate on Dannus V, with Georgiou exchanging goodbyes with Saru and Tilly before beaming down to the snowy planet. While they search, Georgiou explains that she adopted the mirror universe Burnham as she was the only child content with being her own salvation rather than asking for help. They eventually find a human near a door who gives vague and evasive answers to their questions, with Georgiou ultimately resolving to go through the door, finding herself back in the mirror universe in her Terran emperor regalia. Speaking with mirror Tilly, she reveals it is the day of Lorca's uprising and mirror Burnham's betrayal. Georgiou states that she will bring mirror Burnham "back into the fold" rather than killing her, which Tilly questions. Reuniting with mirror Burnham, Georgiou becomes unsettled by Burnham's brutality and tells her of Lorca's plot, which Burnham feigns ignorance of, becoming suspicious when Georgiou prevents the death of a servant (mirror Saru) by claiming them as her own. Watching an elaborate celebration of her ruthless leadership of the Terran Empire, Georgiou is visibly unsettled, but is able to prevent an assassination attempt by mirror Stamets and warns of a plot against her life. Georgiou later tells Burnham she knows she is working with Lorca and tells her to confess in exchange for sparing her life, which Burnham retorts is another sign of Georgiou's weakness. Instead of executing her, she has Burnham placed in captivity.

Georgiou has a resistant Burnham continually tortured, starved, and beaten in an attempt to mentally break her and get her to reveal the names of Lorca's other conspirators and so she can return to the Empire. Tilly questions why Burnham is still alive, and Georgiou insists that she is not showing mercy. Georgiou later visits Burnham's cell while she is unconscious and reminisces about her childhood, confessing that she was sad when Burnham outgrew her night terrors and no longer relied on her, leaving a symbolic globe of fireflies to convince Burnham to trust her again. Burnham later reaffirms her loyalty to Georgiou and offers to kill all of the co-conspirators personally as proof she can be trusted. In her quarters, Georgiou confesses to mirror Saru, that she feels things are going to plan, and encourages him not to fear upcoming biological change, stating that it will make him stronger. The Empire later tracks down another of Lorca's allies and Georgiou orders the ship to be disabled and the traitor kept alive. Burnham kills the man once he is brought to them before turning the gun on Georgiou, who encourages her to make a different choice and stand down. They engage in a knife fight, with Georgiou fighting defensively so as not to injure Burnham, refusing to kill her even when gaining the upper hand. Eventually, she is left no choice and apologizes as she stabs Burnham with her sword as the two lay dying side by side. Georgiou then wakes up back on Dannus V, with prime universe Burnham revealing she has only been unconscious for a few minutes. The mysterious man reveals himself to be a Guardian of Forever, and tells Georgiou he was testing her to see whether she would make better choices following her time in this universe and deserved a second chance at life. He notes that, despite ultimately having to kill her Burnham again, she attempted to make peace and saved Saru. He summons a portal and tells her to walk through, promising it will send her back in time to an era where the prime and mirror universes are close enough together that she can live out her days without fear of death. During a tearful goodbye, Georgiou tells Burnham that bringing her to the prime universe gave her a new life, and Burnham explains that their relationship is uniquely theirs and is unrelated to their prior relationships with prime Georgiou and mirror Burnham. As she walks into the portal, Burnham offers a Vulcan salute, while Georgiou responds with a Terran one before disappearing. Later on the Discovery, the crew toast to Georgiou.
