= Michael Burnham =

Fictional character from Star Trek: Discovery

- Star Trek character
- Sonequa Martin-Green as xeno-anthropologist Michael Burnham
- First appearance: "The Vulcan Hello" (2017) (Discovery)
- Created by: Bryan Fuller; Alex Kurtzman
- Portrayed by: Sonequa Martin-Green; Arista Arhin (young)
- Voiced by: Kyrie McAlpin (Short Treks; young)

In-universe information
- Species: Human
- Gender: Female
- Occupation: xeno-anthropologist First Officer (2250s–2256); Science specialist (2256); Captain (mirror universe); Science officer (2257–3189); Captain (3189–3200); Admiral (3200 onward)
- Family: Mike Burnham (father; deceased); Gabrielle Burnham (mother); Sarek (adoptive father; deceased); Amanda Grayson (adoptive mother; deceased); Spock (adoptive brother; deceased); Sybok (adoptive brother; deceased); Philippa Georgiou (adoptive mother, mirror universe)
- Significant others: Ash Tyler / Voq (lover; deceased); Cleveland Booker (partner); Gabriel Lorca (mirror universe Burnham only; deceased)
- Children: Leto (son)
- Planet: Earth and Vulcan(Ni'Var)
- Affiliation: United Federation of Planets; Starfleet; USS Shenzhou; USS Discovery; ISS Shenzhou
- Born: 2226
- Age: (As of 3200) 43 (physiological), 978 (chronological)

Michael Burnham is the protagonist of Star Trek: Discovery, portrayed by American actress Sonequa Martin-Green. She originally appears as the First Officer of USS Shenzhou under Philippa Georgiou (Michelle Yeoh) until she commits mutiny, for which she is stripped of rank and sent to prison for life. Burnham is later recruited by Gabriel Lorca (Jason Isaacs) on USS Discovery as a science specialist after serving only six months of her sentence, with Lorca viewing Burnham as an asset in the war against the Klingons. She serves as the series lead. The character is introduced as a xeno-anthropologist helping the Earth-based Starfleet understand and engage with new cultures in outer space.

Bryan Fuller conceived the character based on the cultural impact of Nichelle Nichols' portrayal of Uhura, as well as that of Mae Jemison and Ruby Bridges. She is also revealed as the adoptive sister to Spock (Ethan Peck). Burnham is an orphan, after her parents are killed by Klingons, until she is taken in by Sarek (James Frain). Controversy arose among fans from the decision to connect her history to Spock's family, with fans debating whether this is consistent with established continuity. Development of the character was largely praised by critics leading up to the debut for having a Black woman lead for the first time in Star Trek history, and reviews of Martin-Green's performance have been positive.

== Creation and development ==
In December 2016, it was announced that Martin-Green would serve as the series lead of Star Trek: Discovery, with the character initially named "Rainsford". In previous iterations of Star Trek, Spock had never mentioned a sister. Executive producer Alex Kurtzman has explained that the specifics of Burnham's backstory would be revealed in a way that would not break the existing canon continuity. Unlike previous Star Trek leads, Burnham was not made a starship captain, "to see a character from a different perspective on the starship—one who has different dynamic relationships with a captain, with subordinates, it gave us richer context".

The character was originally to be referred to only by the name Number One, to honor the character of that name portrayed by Majel Barrett in the original Star Trek pilot "The Cage." With changes in the pre-production storyline, the character is found guilty of mutiny and no longer a First Officer by the end of the pilot episode. Thus, the Michael Burnham name was revealed during the first episode, quickly making "Number One" her informal name, the same as First Officer William Riker's informal name on the series Star Trek: The Next Generation.

Series creator Bryan Fuller deliberately gave Martin-Green's character a traditionally male name, which he had done with the female leads (George, Jaye and Chuck) in three of his previous series. Martin-Green decided that the character was named after her father. Executive producer Aaron Harberts spoke to TV Guide and explained the reason for calling the character a traditionally male name, explaining, "We've worked on many shows with Bryan and it's a motif. It's his signature move to name his lead women with names that would typically be associated as male." He felt the name was "cool and different" and pitched it himself explaining, "[I was] thinking of female columnist Michael Sneed, who writes for the Chicago Sun-Times, and The Bangles' bassist Michael Steele." He added, "And, of course, an archangel is named Michael as well, and it just had a lot of potency for us." Sonequa Martin-Green expressed enthusiasm about the name, liking the symbolism and anticipating a more gender-fluid and equal opportunity future. Of the name, she said, "I appreciated the statement it makes all on its own to have this woman with this male name, just speaking of the amelioration of how we see men and women in the future."

Bryan Fuller had numerous inspirations for conceiving the character of Michael Burnham. He cited the cultural impact of Nichelle Nichols' portrayal of Uhura saying, "I couldn't stop thinking about how many black people were inspired by seeing Nichelle Nichols on the bridge of a ship [as Lt. Uhura in The Original Series]". Another inspiration came from the legacy of Ruby Bridges, the first black child to attend an all-white elementary school in Louisiana, as well as Mae Jemison, the first woman of color to travel in space.

Martin-Green referred to her character as being "the only human to have not just attended the Vulcan Science Academy but excelled as well, [which] speaks to Burnham's intellect and just sheer level of intelligence". She referred to her character as "highly disciplined, highly principled, and the Vulcan-Human dichotomy that lives within her is emblematic of her personality. It is the two realities living within me at all times."

== Casting ==
=== Auditioning process ===
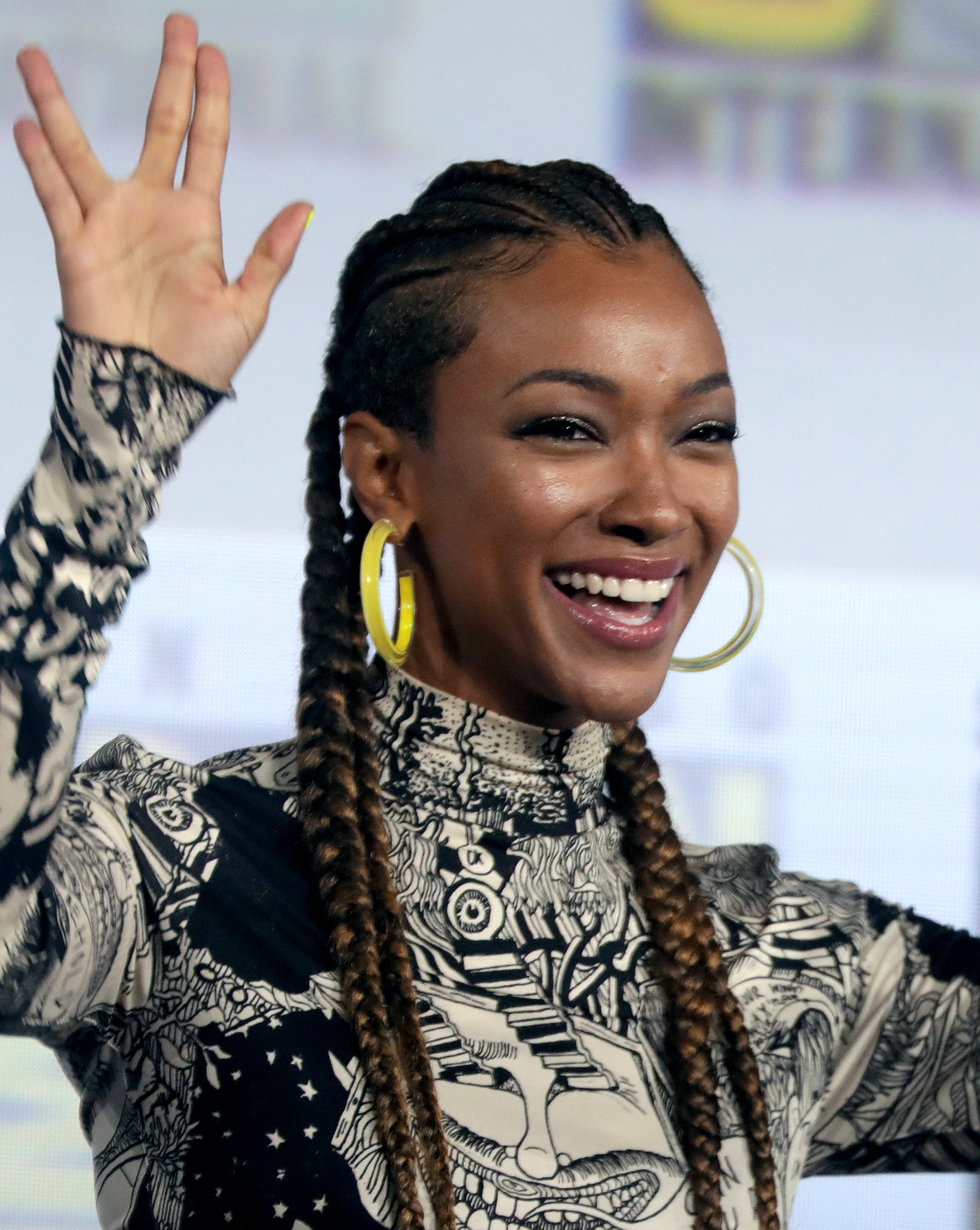
Martin-Green making a Vulcan hand sign in 2019

The casting process was difficult for producers. They searched long and hard to find an actor to pull off Burnham's divided nature between Vulcan and human. Harberts said, "We read a lot of people and they either went way too robotic and chilly or way too emotional. What's beautiful about Sonequa's performance is she's capable of playing two, three, four things at once. She's got such a great command of her craft, she's able to be aloof but warm; logical but able to surrender her emotional side to the audience." Alex Kurtzman felt the character's portrayal needed to have "remarkable duality inside her" between being "highly emotional" while also being "contained". "Unlike Spock, who is half-human, half-Vulcan, she is all human, but she's been trained with the kind of Vulcan emotional-suppression ideology, and that is very challenging for her... you can see that wrestling match going on in every moment. That was the single most important thing to define the character, and I think we just had a sense that [Sonequa] intuitively understood it." He went further to express the challenge of the "technical jargon" used in the series: "It's a tough thing to learn with actors. You either have the ability to roll that off your tongue, or you don't. And if you don't, everything kind of trips over itself... And when [Sonequa] read, we all breathed a massive sigh of relief, because she brought an instant authenticity to it. It was very clear that the language was not going to be difficult for her."

Sonequa Martin-Green first met with Discovery co-creator Bryan Fuller at New York Comic Con in October 2016. Fuller talked to her about Burnham, a human orphan raised on planet Vulcan alongside Spock (Leonard Nimoy) from the original series, leading to a conflict with her two cultural identities. Knowing that her character Sasha would be killed off The Walking Dead, she shot a video audition. However, AMC refused to release her from her contract, leading CBS to look elsewhere. Fuller revealed that he had long set his sights on Martin-Green to star in Discovery, but CBS pushed back because AMC would not release her from her contract until Sasha's death was shown on-screen. CBS' second premiere date delay from May to September was due to the restrictions of Martin-Green's contract, though the first delay opened the door for her to land the role. She auditioned in person in December, and then began shooting in January. On getting the part, she expressed nervousness and excitement saying, "When I first got started, I had my freak-out phase. I had my almost catatonic moment where I thought, 'What is happening?' And I knew very quickly that I couldn't live there and that I couldn't create there. I owed it to the story and I owed it to the legacy to get it together. And I had to focus myself in gratitude. I had to focus myself on the passion for the vision for the story that we're doing."

=== Announcement ===
The casting for Michael Burnham, under the pseudonym "Commander Rainsford" leaked in December 2016, with many speculating Martin-Green's previous role as Sasha on The Walking Dead would come to an end. Following the announcement, Nichelle Nichols tweeted "All my love @SonequaMG, I've been smiling since I heard. You're gonna knock em dead." Charlie Jane Anders for Wired felt Martin-Green's casting fulfilled Gene Roddenberry's ultimate vision saying, "It's all too easy to see Star Trek's humanism as merely a matter of embracing science and rejecting barbarism—but that's missing what makes Trek's version of humanism so powerful. Diversity was always a key part of Star Trek's vision of a better future for humanity. In the ideal world of the 24th century, every human being has the opportunity to reach his or her full potential, either in the sciences or elsewhere; anything less doesn't represent real progress." Showrunner of The Walking Dead admitted it was unfortunate that the casting leak happened, spoiling events to come, but that "The folks over at Star Trek got lucky with the timing".

On the importance and impact of the role, Martin-Green said, "My casting says that the sky is the limit for all of us. I think what we're seeing now in our media is this push to diminish and to devalue and to make people feel that the sky is not the limit for them, that they are meant for the ground. So having me as the first black female lead of a Star Trek just blasts that into a million pieces. I am eternally grateful that the diverse casting of our show means that we are now a part of the conversation and hopefully a part of making the world a better place, as cliché as this sounds. Because I really believe it and think its vital for us all right now". Nichols and Martin-Green both posed together on the red carpet at the Star Trek: Discovery premiere. Martin-Green shared on Instagram that Nichols whispered, "Enjoy this time. It's yours now." Sonequa Martin-Green praised Nichols thereafter saying, "What a blessing, what a woman. I stand on your shoulders Nichelle Nichols".

== Appearances ==
=== Background ===
Burnham was born to human parents, secretly Section 31 scientists, who were killed when she was a child during a Klingon raid to retrieve a time crystal on a Human-Vulcan research facility on Doctari Alpha, where the family lived. She was then adopted by the Vulcan ambassador Sarek (James Frain) and his human wife Amanda (Mia Kirshner), who are also the biological parents of Starfleet officer Spock, and moved to the Vulcan homeworld. This, of course, made her Spock’s heretofore unmentioned sister. Burnham was the first human to attend both the Vulcan Learning Center and Vulcan Science Academy, training as a xenoanthropologist. After completing the academy she was brought by Sarek, who shared his Katra with Burnham, to the USS Shenzhou to rejoin her people.

The decision to make Burnham related to the history of original series character Spock was controversial. Beth Elderkin for io9 decided that it "breaks canon" and that "It seems unlike Spock to completely ignore someone who seemed to be a major part of his life—especially one who came into his life after such tragedy." In contrast, Laurie Ulster of TrekMovie.com felt the decision was "not that big of a deal", clashing with Elderkin's point about Spock, citing the fact that Spock never mentioned his half-brother Sybok until he showed up, or revealed his parents were Sarek and Amanda, as well as the numerous "secret siblings" placed in Star Trek.

=== Star Trek: Discovery ===
==== Mutiny ====
In the series premiere of Discovery, she has already served under Captain Georgiou on the USS Shenzhou for seven years. The series opens with Shenzhou encountering the Klingons, with Burnham committing an act of mutiny, breaking Starfleet regulations to give the order to fire first, in an attempt to save her captain and ship against the Klingons. Her plan is unsuccessful and she is detained. In "Battle at the Binary Stars", Burnham escapes the brig and convinces Georgiou to take T'Kuvma hostage. However, T'Kuvma kills Georgiou. In a moment of emotional weakness, Burnham kills T'Kuvma, making him a martyr. She is convicted of mutiny, stripped of rank, and sentenced to life in prison.

This mutiny is the cornerstone of the entire setup for the series; however, it also became one of the first of many complaints about the show's apparent disregard for Star Trek canon and continuity. In the Star Trek episode "The Tholian Web", while investigating the loss of the USS Defiant, Captain Kirk and crew find that the entire crew of the Defiant was dead. The entire crew went wild and killed each other. In that episode Chekov asks Spock specifically if there has ever been a mutiny on a starship before, to which Spock answers, "absolutely no record of such an occurrence", which is not possible, since some 10 years earlier Spock's own adopted sister became the first and most infamous mutineer in Starfleet history. At the end of Discovery season 2 they tried to rectify some of the canon issues by having Starfleet order Spock and the others never to reveal what happened to the USS Discovery, or even its existence, but the mutiny happened on the USS Shenzhou, and was well known to Starfleet personnel, as seen in "Battle at the Binary Stars".

==== USS Discovery ====
In "Context Is for Kings", USS Discovery's Captain Gabriel Lorca brings Burnham back to duty with a temporary war-time assignment as a scientist on his crew, praising her risk-taking behaviour as valuable in the war. She is met with hostility among the Discovery crew, being viewed as responsible for starting the war with the Klingons. Burnham eventually befriends her roommate, Sylvia Tilly (Mary Wiseman). In "The Butcher's Knife Cares Not for the Lamb's Cry", Lorca orders Burnham and Landry (Rekha Sharma) to find a way to weaponize Ripper, a violent macroscopic Tardigrade found on the USS Glenn. Burnham hypothesizes that Ripper's behavior on the Glenn was defensive in nature and that he was not inherently dangerous, since biological analysis showed him to be herbivorous. But with the Klingons attacking Corvan II, Landry was desperate for results and fired a phaser at him, causing him to maul her to death. She also overcomes her fear of opening the last will of Georgiou through Tilly's coercion. She learns Georgiou left her with a telescope, a prized possession handed down through her family for hundreds of years, noting Burnham as a curious explorer and believing she has her own command at this point. In "Choose Your Pain", Burnham voices her concerns about the spore drive jumps used on Ripper as Saru is acting captain upon Lorca's abduction by Klingons. Saru is outraged at Burnham for turning the spore-drive offline without his knowledge, and searching for compatible DNA sequences to replace Ripper. Burnham suggests a human host replacement would be possible, but Saru disregards her point, calling her a predator. Later, Burnham asks if he is afraid of her, but he tells her he is jealous because he wanted to learn everything from Georgiou and she did instead, and rather than she become captain and teach him, her actions led him to be unprepared as acting captain for today. Burnham gives Saru the telescope Georgiou gave her, feeling she doesn't deserve it. Saru lets Burnham free Ripper back into space, and Stamets becomes the host replacement needed, injecting himself with tardigrade DNA.

In "Lethe", Sarek is almost killed and Burnham is forced to save him. She discovers he chose his biological son Spock over her, as Sarek was only given the option of sending one child to the Vulcan Expeditionary Group, with the Vulcans considering both children "experiments" (half-human and full human indoctrinated in Vulcan culture). The decision is ultimately pointless as Spock chose Starfleet, after Burnham was forced to go. After retrieving Sarek, Burnham attempts to get Sarek to open up to her about their encounter. Sarek pretends to be unaware, but Burnham can tell he is lying, saying he can do better. She says they will have the conversation one day, and leaves calling him "father" to spite him after he said they were technically not family because they are not related. She also develops a friendship with Ash Tyler (Shazad Latif), who helps her through Sarek attempting to push her away.

In "Magic to Make the Sanest Man Go Mad", Harry Mudd (Rainn Wilson) takes over Discovery and keeps the ship in a time loop so he can complete his mission to sell the ship to the Klingons. Burnham appears uncomfortable as, during this time, a party is occurring and she struggles with her romantic feelings for Tyler. Stamets (Anthony Rapp), the only one aware of the time loop, warns Burnham while also helping her with her feelings for Tyler. Burnham and Tyler dance and kiss, before Mudd kills him. Burnham manipulates Mudd into turning back time again to save him, revealing who she is and how high a prize she is for the Klingons. She kills herself to convince Mudd to do so, although the next time around, Burnham successfully tricks Mudd and he is sent away. Burnham and Tyler are left to imagine their first kiss, which they only know of because Stamets has told them about it happening. In "Si Vis Pacem, Para Bellum", Burnham and Tyler go with Saru to the planet Pahvo as part of a plan to overcome the Klingons' cloaking technology, where they kiss again and renew their romance. In "Into the Forest I Go", Burnham convinces Lorca to let her enter the Klingon Sarcophagus ship, where Burnham gets into a fight with Kol (Kenneth Mitchell), ultimately escaping and retrieving Philippa's badge. An attack is made on Kol's ship, blowing it up. Burnham notices Tyler's PTSD attack caused by seeing L'Rell (Mary Chieffo) and later learns that L'Rell sexually abused him, with Tyler forced to acquiesce in order to stay alive.

==== Mirror Universe ====
In "Despite Yourself", the USS Discovery transports to the mirror universe. Burnham learns she earned the rank of captain on the ISS Shenzhou. During her career, she won medals for Valor, for being a Master of Poisons, and for 100 kills. While in command of the ISS Shenzhou, she was ordered to hunt down Gabriel Lorca, who was attempting a coup against the emperor. Her shuttlecraft was destroyed during this operation and she is presumed dead. Burnham is forced to disguise as her Terran counterpart on the ISS Shenzhou in order to retrieve the data files on the Constitution-class USS Defiant, to uncover how it crossed into the mirror universe's past. Burnham and Lorca play the part of their Terran selves. Ensign Connor, who is now Captain Connor, attempts to kill Burnham in an attempt to maintain his new position, but fails. The ISS Shenzhou applaud Burnham for her killing as she takes the captain's chair. Later, Burnham appears exhausted keeping up the act, and goes to her quarters where she and Tyler, who joined Burnham as her personal bodyguard, have sex.

In "The Wolf Inside", Burnham becomes increasingly agitated with her facade as Mirror Burnham, and questions how long you can keep a facade up until you actually become something you initially weren't. She is alarmed by Mirror Saru, who is a nameless slave in this universe, and decides to name him Saru in honor of her friend. Mirror Saru is shocked by her friendly gesture. Burnham is tasked to destroy a rebel base on the planet Harlak. Instead, she and Tyler opt to form a secret alliance with the Vulcans, Klingons, Andorians and Tellarites who oppose the Terran Empire. Voq appears, the mirror universe counterpart of the Klingon she fought at the Binary Stars, and asks Mirror Sarek, known as The Prophet, to mind meld with Burnham to see if her intentions are pure. Mirror Sarek is taken aback by Burnham's memories, and concludes she is a compassionate person who means them no harm. Burnham becomes curious of Voq's ability to forge alliances with other alien races, in order to find the solution to the Klingon war in her universe. Voq's explanation triggers Tyler who speaks in Klingon and attacks Voq. Burnham convinces Mirror Voq to spare Tyler's life. When Burnham and Tyler return to the ISS Shenzhou, having faked the attack, she confronts Tyler. Tyler admits he doesn't think he is actually Ash Tyler. It becomes apparent Tyler is actually Voq and speaking with Mirror Voq set off his true nature, having been brought on the USS Discovery originally as a sleeper agent all along. Burnham is confused, but then realizes Tyler is the one she fought at the Binary Stars. Tyler, now mentally fully turned into Voq, attempts to kill her. Burnham is unable to defend herself, and Mirror Saru arrives and attacks Tyler, saving her. Burnham fakes Tyler's execution, actually transporting him to the Discovery ship together with the files from the USS Defiant (NCC-1764) where he is held captive. Later, Burnham is dismayed to learn her falsities at Harlak have been uncovered by the silent emperor, who turns out to be her former captain Philippa Georgiou's mirror version.

In "Vaulting Ambition", Burnham and Lorca are transported to the ISS Charon, as the revelation that Georgiou is the emperor weighs down on her, making her feel the situation is a reckoning for her betrayal of her own Georgiou. Lorca refuses to bow to Georgiou, and is taken to an agony booth. Georgiou suspects Burnham of deception, and holding a knife to her neck asks why she has come here, revealing she is aware that she conspired to kill her and take her throne with Lorca. Burnham is left shocked by this revelation of her mirror counterpart's betrayal as well. When she refers to the emperor as "Philippa", she is outraged, as she would normally refer to her as "mother". Later, Burnham reveals prior to her execution that she is from another universe, using Prime Philippa's insignia as proof. Emperor Georgiou agrees to make a deal with Burnham to exchange the spore drive technology in exchange for her freedom to go home. Later, Burnham learns more about her mirror counterpart's history. In this universe, due to Terran supremacy, rather than Sarek and Amanda raising Michael after her parents were killed, Emperor Philippa Georgiou did instead. However, Mirror Burnham's quest to hunt down Lorca appears to be a ruse, as she was conspiring against her own adoptive mother to kill her and take her throne with Lorca, who Mirror Burnham once viewed as a father figure, until she grew up and it became romantic. Georgiou tells Burnham about Lorca planning to "cross time and space itself to take what was rightfully his" and Burnham puts the pieces together, along with Georgiou's sensitivity to light (the single biological difference between the Terrans and humans), that Lorca is from the mirror universe and their crossing over was not an accident.

In "What's Past is Prologue", Burnham works out a plan to deliver Georgiou to Lorca in the same way she planned. Burnham tells Lorca she will stay in exchange for Discovery's safe passage home, but it is a ruse, as Georgiou and Burnham begin attacking and killing Lorca's men. Eventually, Burnham gets the upper hand on Lorca with a phaser, telling him that they would've helped him get home, because that's who Starfleet is, and that is who she is, which is why she won't kill him. Georgiou, however, kills him instead. She then allows Burnham to go back home, with her reign as emperor gone given Lorca's rebellion, deciding to die killing Lorca's men. However, Burnham saves Georgiou at the last minute, holding onto her, as they are transported back to the Discovery and into the prime universe.

==== Ending the Federation–Klingon War ====
In "The War Without, The War Within", the Discovery jumps nine months ahead in 2257, with the Federation suffering significant losses in the war with the Klingons. Burnham reveals to Admiral Cornwell and Sarek about the arrival of their guest, Emperor Georgiou. Burnham asks Cornwell to give Emperor Georgiou political asylum, feeling sympathy for her, despite not being her Georgiou. Later, Tilly convinces Burnham to confront Ash, who is now fully recovered with dual memories, feeling deep remorse for Voq's actions. Sarek tells her not to regret loving someone, encouraging her further. Burnham ultimately ends their relationship. Though Ash pleads with not to do so, Burnham explains that she was lost after the battle of the binary stars, and having to reclaim life is punishing and solitary.

In the season one finale, "Will You Take My Hand?", Emperor Georgiou poses as Prime Georgiou, enlisted by Starfleet to end the war however she sees fit in exchange for her freedom. Burnham, Tilly and Tyler accompany her to Qo'nos. Ultimately, Burnham is forced to stop Georgiou's genocidal attack on the Klingon home planet, outraged at Cornwell and Starfleet for enabling the act. Burnham manipulates Georgiou to give her the explosive device, by telling her if she doesn't, she will have to watch her daughter die again. Georgiou reluctantly agrees and walks off to her freedom. Burnham offers L'Rell a peace treaty, to call off the Klingons' planned invasion on Earth in exchange for the device as a measure of peace and diplomacy in order to end the war. Ash reassures a reluctant L'Rell to take charge. After the incident, Burnham's act of diplomacy in finishing the war ends with her, and many of the Discovery crew, decorated by Starfleet with the Medal of Honor for their heroic actions. Burnham is fully reinstated as a Commander in Starfleet, her record is expunged, she is pardoned by the Federation President, and she becomes the Chief Science Officer for the Discovery. Burnham and Tyler decide to go their separate ways, Tyler planning to find a union between humans and Klingons with L'Rell, and Burnham back aboard Discovery. On their course to Vulcan to pick up the new Discovery captain, they receive a transmission from Captain Christopher Pike of the USS Enterprise.

After Pike takes command of Discovery in the Season 2 premiere "Brother", Burnham sees a "Red Angel" aboard USS Hiawatha.

=== Novels ===
The 2017 original tie-in novel Star Trek Discovery: Desperate Hours, is set in 2255, one year prior to the pilot, when Burnham has recently been promoted to acting first officer. The story sees her on a mission to save thousands of innocent lives by infiltrating an alien ship, with the help of a man she has attempted to avoid her entire life, while simultaneausly facing the truth of her troubled past. She also works with her adoptive brother Spock, who visits the Shenzhou with Captain Pike.

== Reception ==
Writing for E! News, Chris Harnick reviewed the first two episodes of Discovery—"The Vulcan Hello" and "Battle at the Binary Stars"—and considered Martin-Green's performance the strongest element of the show. He praised her acting as a human raised in a Vulcan world by saying, "[T]he emotional conflict between the two ideologies in Michael Burnham is perhaps the most interesting part of the series, and presents a fascinating window into the world of Star Trek: Discovery." Writing for the episode "Context Is for Kings", Daniel Mallory Ortberg of Vulture referred to Martin-Green as "the standout" who is "given a lot more to work with and is, in turn, captivating, charming (I didn't know I wanted to see her scrabbling through a series of Jefferies tubes reciting Alice in Wonderland to herself until it happened), and heartbreakingly winsome."

Chaim Gartenberg for The Verge praised the uniqueness of Burnham in comparison to previous Trek protagonists saying, "[she] isn't like any protagonist we've seen in Star Trek so far, and not only because she doesn't command a starship or space station. She's a far more rounded, human character than any of the previous captains, with some serious trauma from a Klingon attack in her youth that's left her predisposed to hate the warrior race. And while Star Trek has plumbed the 'main character has demons' well in the past—most notably with Sisko in Deep Space Nine, and Picard in the later films, when it comes to the Borg—Burnham feels far more compelling for not being a flawless human being in other respects, as her series-protagonist predecessors were."

TV Guide listed Martin-Green in the ranking of "The 25 Best TV Performances of 2017" coming at 14. The article highlighted, "Martin-Green has delivered the sort of performance that lights up every moment she's on screen. This is how stars are born." CultureFly's David Bedwell included Burnham in their list of "11 Best TV Characters of 2017" saying, "With their first ever black female lead and a character that's hardly straight-laced, Sonequa Martin-Green gets a lot to sink her teeth into.

Variety added Martin-Green among the list of Top Breakout TV Stars of 2017 in the role of Burnham. Joe Otterson said, "Despite a lot of negative news coming out ahead of "Discovery's" premiere (including multiple premiere date delays), Martin-Green deftly took on the challenge of leading the new installment of the iconic sci-fi franchise. Her portrayal of convicted Starfleet mutineer Michael Burnham made the new show truly binge-worthy."

Martin-Green was chosen as TVLine performer of the week for the episode "The Wolf Inside", as she "conveyed the resulting shock in gut-wrenching fashion, her eyes welling up with tears as Burnham was forced to point a phaser at the man she thought she loved." They went further saying, "Equally adept at big action scenes and quiet character moments, Martin-Green has been the glue holding Star Trek: Discovery together all season long—and all those weeks of repressed emotion just made this week's splendid showcase all the more impactful. Here's hoping Burnham lives long... and prospers."

In reviewing the full season, Marissa Martinelli of Slate felt that Martin-Green saved Discovery from "getting lost in a maze of plot twists [...] As a human raised by Vulcans, it would have been easy to make Burnham yet another Spock or Data, her humanity buried under layers and layers of logic. Instead, Martin-Green plays her with a fierce charisma and warmth, making Burnham not only a compass in the wilderness but a light in the darkness, too." However, the reviewer also felt Burnham's arc wrapped up "too neatly".

Some critics had a negative reaction to Burnham's arc. Andy Vandervell for Wired expressed disappointment in the conclusion of Burnham's first season arc saying, "I can see what they were trying to do with the finale in completing Michael Burnham's journey from mutineer to saviour of the Federation, both literally and figuratively, but the execution was so clumsy and anticlimactic it just undercut all the emotional weight of her story." Zack Handlen for The A.V. Club commented, "I can sort of see how Burnham changed (the trip to the Mirror Universe taught her the consequences of brutal thinking), but the show has done such a terrible job at establishing the character and motivations of Starfleet and the Federation that the sudden decision to commit murder on such a massive, unprecedented scale is at once shocking and utterly weightless."

Liz Shannon Miller for IndieWire and James Luxford for Metro appreciated the conclusions of Burnham's arc. Miller said, "Burnham's lengthy speech to the council awarding her and her fellow crewmen with well-deserved honors had plenty of standout moments. But there's something interesting about her choice to invoke Voq's official title within the Klingon Empire, which speaks to how both civilizations are now struggling to sort out their place in the world", while Luxford commented, "It's great to see Burnham redeemed." Scott Collura for IGN said, "There's a nice symmetry to Burnham and Voq/Tyler's journeys between the pilot episode and this finale, with Michael once again staging a sort of mutiny, only this time doing so for all the right reasons and with the support of her friends too."

In 2017, Screen Rant ranked Michael Burnham the 6th most attractive person in the Star Trek universe, in between Worf and Spock.

In 2019, CinemaBlend ranked Michael Burnham the seventh best Star Trek Starfleet character of all time. In 2019, Michael Burnham was ranked the number one sexiest Star Trek character by Syfy.
