= Gretchen Berg =

Gretchen Berg may refer to:

- Gretchen J. Berg (born 1971), American writer and television producer
- Gretchen Berg, a character in the TV series Heroes
