= Valentine (film) =

2001 film by Jamie Blanks

- Theatrical release poster
- Directed by: Jamie Blanks
- Screenplay by: Donna Powers; Wayne Powers; Gretchen J. Berg; Aaron Harberts
- Based on: Valentine by Tom Savage
- Produced by: Dylan Sellers
- Starring: David Boreanaz; Denise Richards; Marley Shelton; Katherine Heigl; Jessica Capshaw
- Cinematography: Rick Bota
- Edited by: Steve Mirkovich
- Music by: Don Davis
- Production companies: Warner Bros. Pictures; Village Roadshow Pictures; NPV Entertainment; Cupid Pictures, Inc.
- Distributed by: Warner Bros. Pictures (United States); Roadshow Entertainment (Australia)
- Release dates: February 2, 2001 (United States); May 3, 2001 (Australia)
- Running time: 96 minutes
- Countries: United States; Canada; Australia
- Language: English
- Budget: $29 million
- Box office: $36.7 million

Valentine is a 2001 slasher film directed by Jamie Blanks. The film's ensemble cast stars David Boreanaz, Denise Richards, Marley Shelton, and Katherine Heigl. A loose adaptation of the 1997 novel by Tom Savage, the plot follows a group of female childhood friends in San Francisco who are stalked by a killer wearing a Cupid mask in the days leading up to Valentine's Day.

A co-production between the United States, Canada and Australia, Valentine was shot in Vancouver, British Columbia in the summer of 2000. Released theatrically in the United States on February 2, 2001, the film was panned by critics, with many deeming it too similar to 1980s slasher films. It also earned $36.7 million at the box office against a $29 million budget.

In the years since its original release, Valentine has received some retrospective critical praise for its stylistic elements and representation of male-female social dynamics, as well as its giallo influences.

== Plot ==
In 1988, Jeremy Melton, an outcast junior high school student in San Francisco, asks four popular girls to dance at a Valentine's Day dance. The first three girls, Shelley, Lily, and Paige, reject him cruelly, while the fourth girl, Kate, politely responds, "Maybe later". Their overweight, awkward friend Dorothy accepts Jeremy's invitation, and they proceed to kiss behind the bleachers. A group of boys find and mock them, leading Dorothy to falsely claim Jeremy attacked her. Jeremy is beaten and humiliated by the bullies and his nose bleeds from distress. Due to Dorothy's false accusation and subsequent ones by the other girls, Jeremy is expelled and, eventually, institutionalized.

Thirteen years later, Shelley, now a medical student at UCLA, returns to her lab after an unsuccessful date with Jason Marquette. There, she receives a threatening Valentine's card and is killed by a stalker in a Cupid mask, whose nose bleeds after killing her. Back in San Francisco, Paige intends to get Kate away from her boyfriend, Adam, a journalist and recovering alcoholic. After attending an unsuccessful speed dating event, Paige and Kate learn of Shelley's death. At her funeral, Kate, Lily, Paige, and Dorothy are questioned. Paige, Lily, and Dorothy receive threatening Valentine's cards next, each signed "JM". Meanwhile, Dorothy's boyfriend, Campbell, loses his apartment and temporarily moves in with her at her father's mansion.

The women attend an exhibit by Lily's artist boyfriend Max's work, where they encounter Ruthie, who accuses Campbell of being a con artist. In a maze portion of the exhibit, the killer corners Lily and fatally shoots her with multiple arrows, causing her to fall into a dumpster. After finding Lily has disappeared, the women reveal to Det. Vaughan their earlier harassment and Jeremy and Jason are pinned as suspects. Afterwards, Dorothy confesses to Kate and Paige that she fabricated her story about Jeremy to save face. Due to Paige's flirting, Vaughan reveals that Jeremy's parents died in a house fire, and Kate discovers that all records of Jeremy have been erased. Meanwhile, Kate's sleazy neighbor Gary breaks into her apartment to wear her underwear, and the killer brutally bludgeons him to death with a hot iron.

Dorothy hosts a Valentine's party at her estate, which Ruthie attends to collect her investment back from Campbell. She is killed, along with Paige, Campbell, and Dorothy's maid, Millie. Max arrives at the party to inform Kate that Lily never arrived in Los Angeles, leaving Kate to believe she may be dead. Vaughn calls Kate to let her know that they let Jason go due to lack of evidence, and encourages the friends to stay in groups until he arrives.

After the party guests clear out, Dorothy and Kate accuse each other's lovers of being the killer, and Dorothy believes that Kate and the others are jealous and still look at her as the "fat girl". Dorothy reveals the resentment she has felt for her friends for years and ends her friendship with them. Kate goes outside to call Vaughn only to discover his severed head in the pond, and becomes convinced that Adam is Jeremy. She finds a drunk Adam waiting for her; when he asks her to dance, she becomes frightened and flees, finding a gun in Dorothy's father's study. The killer jumps out at Kate, but is shot by Adam.

Adam pulls off the killer's mask to reveal that it was Dorothy and explains that childhood trauma can lead to lifelong anger. As they wait for the police to arrive, he says he has always loved Kate and his nose begins to bleed as he smiles with a deranged look in his eyes.

== Cast ==
- David Boreanaz as Adam Carr
- Denise Richards as Paige Prescott
  - Chelcie Burgart as young Paige
- Marley Shelton as Kate Davies
  - Brittany Mayers as young Kate
- Jessica Capshaw as Dorothy Wheeler
  - Kate Logie as young Dorothy
- Katherine Heigl as Shelley Fisher
  - Sarah Mjanes as young Shelley
- Jessica Cauffiel as Lily Voight
  - Chelsea Florko as young Lily
- Hedy Burress as Ruthie Walker
- Daniel Cosgrove as Campbell Morris
- Johnny Whitworth as Max Raimi
- Fulvio Cecere as Detective Leon Vaughn
- Woody Jeffreys as Brian
- Adam J. Harrington as Jason Marquette
- Claude Duhamel as Gary Taylor
- Wyatt Page as Evan Wheeler
- Benita Ha as Kim Wheeler
- Adrian Holmes as Banker
- Ty Olsson as Jock
- Alex Diakun as Pastor
- Sterling McCay as Joe Tulga
- Noel Fisher as Tulga Gang Member #1
- Cody Serpa as Tulga Gang Member #2
- Mark Mullan as Tulga Gang Member #3
- Marshall Virtue as The Cherub
- Joel Palmer as Jeremy Melton

== Production ==
=== Conception ===
Warner Bros. Pictures had acquired the rights to Tom Savage's book Valentine: A Novel in May 1998—which were transferred to Artisan Entertainment before reverting back to Warner Bros.—attaching writers Wayne and Donna Powers, with the latter of the two initially attached to direct

The original script had a different tone from the book and was set on a college campus. The project was rewritten by Gretchen J. Berg and Aaron Harberts, while Wayne Powers stepped down as director for the studio to find a suitable new director to take the helm for the film. In Berg and Harbert's early rewrites of the screenplay, the killer's identity was revealed to be Dorothy, not Adam. They also incorporated various mythological elements surrounding the Valentine's Day holiday into the screenplay, as well as altering the killer's disguise—which had been a pig mask in the Powers' original draft—to a Cupid mask. Richard Kelly was originally offered the chance to direct, but turned the offer down to work on Donnie Darko (2001), and was eventually replaced by Jamie Blanks.

The plot point of the killer's nose bleeding each time he commits a murder was an addition made by Blanks as a reference to Alone in the Dark (1982), one of his favorite slasher films.

=== Casting ===
Hedy Burress auditioned for the role of Dorothy Wheeler, and Tara Reid was considered for the role, but it was given to Jessica Capshaw instead. However, Blanks wanted Burress to star in the film and cast her as Ruthie Walker. Jessica Cauffiel originally auditioned for Denise Richards's role of Paige. In the original cast, Jennifer Love Hewitt was to play Paige Prescott.

A June 2000 press announcement of Boreanaz's casting in the film featured a major plot spoiler revealing his character as the film's villain.

=== Filming ===
Valentine was shot on location in Vancouver, British Columbia, with principal photography commencing on July 10, 2000, and concluding on September 8. David Boreanaz shot all his scenes in less than two weeks. Katherine Heigl only had three days to shoot her scenes as she was already committed to the television series Roswell.

According to Denise Richards, her death scene in which she is attacked and electrocuted in a hot tub took approximately four days to film.

=== Post-production ===
During the film's editing and post-production process, director Blanks trimmed significant violence and gore from multiple murder sequences.

== Soundtrack ==
The musical score for Valentine was composed by Don Davis. The soundtrack also includes the songs "Pushing Me Away" by Linkin Park, "God of the Mind" by Disturbed, "Love Dump (Mephisto Odyssey's Voodoo Mix)" by Static-X, "Superbeast (Porno Holocaust Mix)" by Rob Zombie, "Valentine's Day" by Marilyn Manson, and "Opticon" by Orgy. This soundtrack compilation was lampooned in a sketch by Saturday Night Live, which humorously pointed out that many of the bands featured on it were not only unknown to a mass audience but have oddly nonsensical names.

No.	Title	Artist	Length
1.	"Superbeast" (Porno Holocaust Mix)	Rob Zombie	3:58
2.	"God of the Mind"	Disturbed	3:04
3.	"Love Dump" (Mephisto Odyssey's Voodoo Mix)	Static-X	5:33
4.	"Pushing Me Away"	Linkin Park	3:11
5.	"Rx Queen"	Deftones	4:28
6.	"Opticon"	Orgy	2:57
7.	"Valentine's Day"	Marilyn Manson	3:32
8.	"Filthy Mind"	Amanda Ghost	3:56
9.	"Fall Again"	Professional Murder Music	3:56
10.	"Smartbomb" (BT's Mix)	BT	3:23
11.	"Son Song (Not included in film)"	Soulfly ft. Sean Lennon	4:18
12.	"Take a Picture" (Hybrid Mix)	Filter	8:07
13.	"Breed"	Snake River Conspiracy	4:30
14.	"1 A.M."	Beautiful Creatures	3:27

== Release ==
Valentine had its Hollywood premiere at the Grauman's Chinese Theatre on February 1, 2001, before opening nationwide in the United States on February 2. The film opened theatrically in the United Kingdom on April 13, 2001, and in Australia on May 3, 2001.

=== Marketing ===
In promotion of the film, Warner Bros.'s official website featured digital e-card valentines that visitors could send via email, and stars David Boreanaz and Katherine Heigl—both well known at the time for their roles in the series Angel and Roswell, respectively—appeared at the Los Angeles Comic Book and Science Fiction Festival.

Bruce Ball, then president of domestic theatrical marketing for Warner Bros., stated that the studio planned to air commercials for the film on MTV—only during time slots after 11:00 p.m.—from the beginning of the year leading up to the film's February release.

=== Home media ===
Valentine was released on both DVD and VHS by Warner Home Video on July 24, 2001. Scream Factory released a collector's edition Blu-ray on February 12, 2019, featuring a new 2K scan from the original film elements supervised by Blanks, in addition to newly-commissioned interviews with the cast and crew.

== Reception ==
=== Box office ===
The film collected $10 million during its opening weekend, ranking in second place behind The Wedding Planner. It earned $20,384,136 in the United States and Canada and a total gross of $36,684,136, allowing the film to surpass its $29 million budget.

=== Critical response ===
On the review aggregator website Rotten Tomatoes, 11% of 80 critics' reviews are positive. The website's consensus reads: "Valentine is basically a formulaic throwback to conventional pre-Scream slasher flicks. Critics say it doesn't offer enough suspense or scares to justify its addition to the genre." Metacritic, which uses a weighted average, assigned the film a score of 18 out of 100, based on 17 critics, indicating "overwhelming dislike". Audiences polled by CinemaScore gave the film an average grade of "D+" on an A+ to F scale.

Mick LaSalle of the San Francisco Chronicle gave the film a middling review likening it to a 1980s-style slasher film, but praised the performances, writing: "Valentine isn't scary, but it is unsettling; not ultimately satisfying, but arresting in the moment. Part of the credit has to go to the ensemble. The actresses are vivid, and the characters they play are clearly delineated". Ben Falk of the BBC gave the film two out of five stars: "Let's face it — we all know what's going to happen and director Blanks (Urban Legend) offers up few surprises. There's the host of red herrings of which none really bite, creative deaths, girls running around screaming and then being incredibly thick, but a distinct lack of gratuitous nudity, which would have at least brightened up the landscape". Dennis Harvey of Variety gave the film a similarly mixed review, noting: "Looking good but lacking much in the way of personality or gray matter—rather like its characters—Valentine is a straightforward slasher pic that’s acceptably scary until a weak finale."

Michael Gingold of Fangoria felt that the film was undistinguished among other slasher films, and described the screenplay as "so underwritten (or perhaps overwritten—four scripters are credited) that [director Jamie Blanks is] hard-pressed to bring much in the way of emotional investment to any of the demises." Maitland McDonagh of TV Guide awarded the film one out of five stars, calling the film "a throwback to the formulaic, holiday-themed stalk-and-slash pictures of the early '80s — but why it took four writers to adapt Tom Savage's generic genre novel is thoroughly baffling". Elvis Mitchell of The New York Times also felt the film was formulaically structured, writing: "The worst kind of mystery is one in which nobody cares who the killer is. Even the cast of Valentine doesn't seem that concerned, and their fictional lives are at stake. When it's hard to hear the dialogue because the audience is laughing, it's clear that Valentine doesn't even succeed on its own limited terms." Bruce Westbrook of the Houston Chronicle was similarly unimpressed by the film, deeming its screenplay contrived and formulaic.

John Hazleton of Screen Daily gave the film a favorable assessment, writing: "What makes Valentine... stand out, though, is the way it spreads suspicion from the obvious suspect to every other male in the movie. Gradually, the women's relationships are polluted by fear, leading to a nicely staged climax that leaves the slasher's identity wide open. Interwoven into the guessing game is a look at male-female dynamics that gives the cast, particularly Capshaw, something to bite on." Kevin Thomas of the Los Angeles Times similarly gave the film a positive review, calling it a "smart, stylish horror picture that offers a fresh twist on the ever-reliable revenge theme and affords a raft of talented young actors solid roles that show them to advantage". Salon's Andrew O'Hehir felt that, while "not serious or scary," the film was no less entertaining.

In 2007, Blanks stated in an interview: "Forgive me for [Valentine]. A lot of people give me grief for that, but we did our best".

==== Reappraisal ====
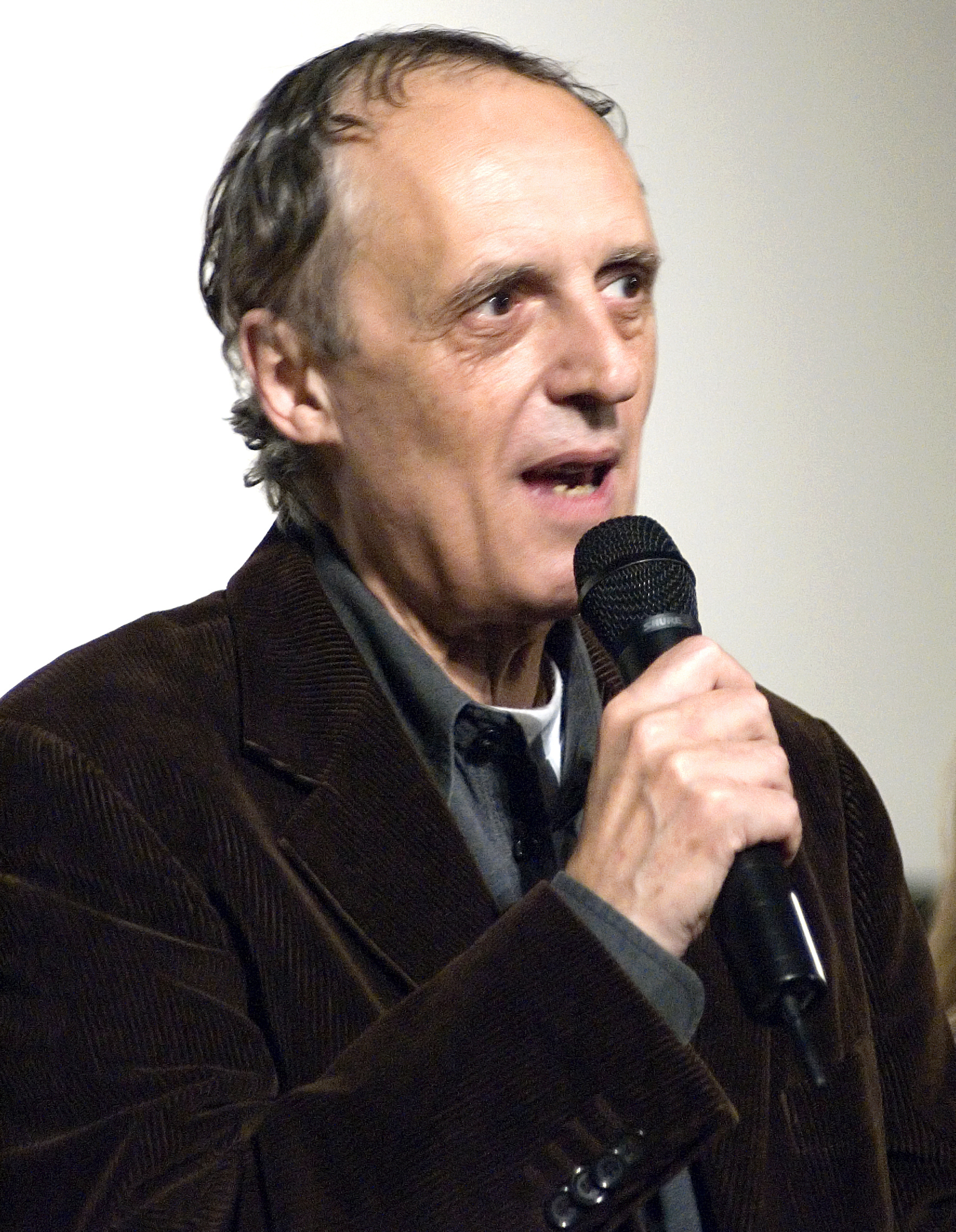
Film scholar Jim Harper compared stylistic elements of the film to those of Dario Argento (pictured)

Writing in his book Legacy of Blood: A Comprehensive Guide to Slasher Movies (2004), academic Jim Harper notes that, while the plot of the film is predictable, "Valentine manages to stand out from the post Scream crowd because of the persistent cruel streak that colours the film," and notes that many of the film's murder sequences appear to be inspired by those in the works of Dario Argento.

In a 2015 retrospective review for Icons of Fright, BJ Colangelo defended the spirit of the film and its thematic handling of the holiday's mythological aspects, calling it "a lot of fun and definitely one I think more people should give a chance."

Ryan Larson, reappraising the film in 2021 for Bloody Disgusting, also wrote of it favorably: "It seems Valentine perhaps suffered from a generation riding the high of the post-Scream meta slashers that wasn’t ready for such a tongue-in-cheek wink at the foundation of the slasher genre. Two decades later, Valentine has received a small, welcome and deserved resurgence as a fun and charming hack and slash in a decade that was overall lacking in the subgenre." Dread Central's Tyler Doupé regarded the film as a contemporary holiday horror classic in a 2022 retrospective, also noting prominent giallo influences throughout it.

In 2026, Peter Gray of The AU Review wrote about Valentine's complex treatment of women, describing the film as "a cult gem, an early-2000s relic that has aged far better than many of its louder peers, and a film whose themes about gender, harassment, and the everyday dangers women navigate feel startlingly modern. What was once labeled 'formulaic' now reads like something far more intentional: a slasher film that was ahead of the curve in its portrayal of women and the social dynamics that threaten them." Dan Tabor, writing for the film blog Cinapse similarly assessed Valentine as a "feminist slasher film," noting: "I know when I first saw Valentine I was lukewarm to it, and now I know why: this film wasn’t aimed at post-pubescent teenage males, but female horror fans."

=== Accolades ===
Award/association	Year	Category	Recipient(s) and nominee(s)	Result	Ref.
Fangoria Chainsaw Awards	2002	Worst Film	Valentine	Won	
Golden Trailer Awards	2001	Best Voiceover	Valentine	Won	
Teen Choice Awards	2002	Choice Movie: Horror/Thriller	Valentine	Nominated	
Teen Choice Awards	2002	Choice Movie Your Parents Didn't Want You to See	Valentine	Nominated	
Teen Choice Awards	2002	Choice Sleazebag	David Boreanaz	Nominated	

== Sources ==
- Harper, Jim (2004). Legacy of Blood: A Comprehensive Guide to Slasher Movies. Manchester, England: Critical Vision. ISBN 978-1-900-48639-2.
- Muir, John Kenneth (2023). Horror Films of 2000–2009. Jefferson, North Carolina: McFarland & Company. ISBN 978-1-476-64450-9.
