= Pepper Dennis =

- Genre: Comedy drama
- Created by: Gretchen J. Berg; Aaron Harberts
- Starring: Rebecca Romijn; Brooke Burns; Rider Strong; Josh Hopkins; Lindsay Price
- Opening theme: "Pepper Dennis Theme" by Danny Lux "Better Half" by Chris Trapper
- Country of origin: United States
- Original language: English
- No. of seasons: 1
- No. of episodes: 13

Production
- Executive producers: Aaron Harberts; Jason Katims; Gretchen J. Berg; Shawn Levy; J.J. Klein
- Producer: Rebecca Romijn
- Running time: 60 minutes
- Production companies: Two Presbyterians Productions; 21 Laps Entertainment; 20th Century Fox Television

Original release
- Network: The WB
- Release: April 4 – July 4, 2006

Pepper Dennis is an American comedy-drama television series that aired on The WB from April 4 to July 4, 2006. It was announced on May 17, 2006, that Pepper Dennis would not be one of the WB shows transferred to The CW. Pepper Dennis was the final new series to premiere on the network.

== Plot ==
The series stars Rebecca Romijn as Pepper Dennis, a television reporter for an evening news broadcast at the fictional television station WEiE (specifically with a small i) in Chicago. The series also starred Rider Strong as Chick, Pepper's cameraman who has an unrequited crush on her, Brooke Burns as Pepper's sheltered and somewhat flaky sister Kathy Dinkle, Lindsay Price as Kimmy Kim, Pepper's closest friend and WEiE's makeup artist and Josh Hopkins as Charlie Babcock, the station's news anchor. One of the focal points of the show was the love-hate relationship between Pepper and Charlie.

== Cast ==
=== Regular cast ===
Actor	Role
Rebecca Romijn	Pepper Dennis (Patty Dinkle)
Brooke Burns	Kathy Dinkle Williams
Josh Hopkins	Charlie Babcock
Lindsay Price	Kimmy Kim
Rider Strong	Chick Dirka

=== Recurring characters ===
Actor	Role
Brett Cullen	Jack Bell
Frederick Koehler	Leslie "Les" Gaye
Alexandra Barreto	Blanca Martinez
Jason Brooks	Bryce Williams
Bob Gunton	Dick Dinkle
Pamela Reed	Lynn Dinkle
A. J. Trauth	Mitch Dinkle
Pooch Hall	Garfield
Larisa Oleynik	Brianna
Henry Simmons	Curtis Wilson
Bob Wiltfong	Lance Powers

=== Other characters ===
- Regina Taufen as Summer Waters
- Frank Lloyd as Pete Pulaski
- Lawrence LeJohn as Fire Lt. J. J. O'Hare
- Carol Kiernan as Mrs. Johnston
- M. C. Gainey as Bobo (helicopter pilot)
- French Stewart as Dr. Crimmons (the company shrink)
- Whitney Anderson as Amber
- Dan Byrd as Todd Haskell
- Sarah Rafferty as Callie Meryl
- Linda Gray as Barbara Meryl
- John Bennett Perry as Mr. Meryl
- Eric Winter as Connor Blanchard
- Jason-Shane Scott as Rick Harper
- Sara Paxton as April May Tyler / Chrissy Tyler
- Robert Gant as Benny Gold
- Adam Cardon as the paparazzo
- Ryan McPartlin as Grady Harper
- Jordan Belfi as Sheldon Zorn
- James Read as Wes Brinkman
- Kristin Minter as Bambi
- Mackenzie Astin as Ken Alston
- Meredith Scott Lynn as Nan Chambers
- Yvette Nicole Brown as Angela Howell
- Timilee Romolini as Connie 'Baby' Unamo
- Candace Kita as 'Squeaky'
- Tangelia Rouse as 'Knuckles'
- Dot-Marie Jones as McGee (credited as Dot Jones)

== Production ==
The song used in commercials for the show was "Black Horse and the Cherry Tree" by KT Tunstall, and the opening theme song is "Better Half" by Chris Trapper, the former frontman for the Boston pop group The Push Stars. Another song that the WB used for advertising "Pepper Dennis" was Morningwood's "Nth Degree" which also appeared in another WB drama, One Tree Hill.

== Episodes ==
No.	Title	Directed by	Written by	Original release date	Prod. code
1	"Pilot"	Shawn Levy	Gretchen J. Berg & Aaron Harberts	April 4, 2006	1ALR79
Pepper Dennis had her sights set on becoming the anchor for Chicago’s top-rated evening news broadcast. Just as she thought that her dream was about to come true this hot new guy, Charlie Babcock, whom she had a one-night stand with gets the job. Pepper's life is further complicated when her sister Kathy, who has split up with her husband, decides to move in.
2	"Poker Clubs and Boob Cams"	Lev L. Spiro	Aaron Harberts & Gretchen J. Berg	April 11, 2006	1ALR01
Pepper goes undercover to expose a prostitution ring at a poker club and find a little more than she anticipated. During a sexual harassment seminar at work Pepper finds herself in a compromising position with Charlie, causing her to re-evaluate her feelings for him. Kathy agrees reconcile with her husband.
3	"Frat Boys May Lose Their Manhood"	Oz Scott	Matt McGuinness	April 18, 2006	1ALR02
Pepper's breakdown on air during a live interview lands her in therapy where she is forced to confront her feelings for and issues with Charlie. Desperate to prove that she still has what it takes to get a story, Pepper ends up being a hostage at a fraternity hazing ritual gone wrong.
4	"Heiress Bridenapped"	Robert Berlinger	Adele Lim	April 25, 2006	1ALR03
During a wedding Pepper soon realizes the bride has been kidnapped.
5	"Saving Venice"	Allison Liddi-Brown	Jason Katims	May 2, 2006	1ALR04
6	"Celebrity Twin Could Hang"	Michael Schultz	Lisa Parsons	May 9, 2006	1ALR05
7	"Curtis Wilson's a Total Nut Job"	Robert Berlinger	Liz Heldens	May 16, 2006	1ALR06
8	"Hiroshi Watanabe in Bed with Curtis Wilson"	Allison Liddi-Brown	Christopher Fife	May 23, 2006	1ALR07
9	"Charlie Babcock's Homosexual Encounter"	Robert Berlinger	Jason Katims	May 30, 2006	1ALR08
10	"Dennis, Bulgari, Big Losers at Acorns"	David Paymer	Katherine Lingenfelter	June 6, 2006	1ALR09
11	"Pepper Dennis Behind Bars"	Allison Liddi-Brown	Katherine Lingenfelter	June 20, 2006	1ALR10
12	"True Love Is Dead"	Peter Lauer	Adele Lim, Liz Heldens	June 27, 2006	1ALR11
13	"Star Anchor Weds Colleague"	Arlene Sanford	Gretchen J. Berg & Aaron Harberts	July 4, 2006	1ALR12
Babcock has unexpectedly proposed to Pepper, and they find themselves walking down the aisle together. Unfortunately for Pepper, she learns that Babcock's proposal isn't motivated out of love.
