= Chris Obi =

English actor and filmmaker

- Born: Christopher Obi Ogugua; 24 September 1970 (age 56); London, England, U.K.
- Occupation: Actor

Christopher Obi Ogugua // (born September 24, 1970) is an English actor and filmmaker who trained at Drama Centre London and graduated in 2001. He has done a season at the Royal Shakespeare Company where he was directed by Sir Antony Sher in the four-hander, Breakfast with Mugabe and a season at the Globe Theatre in 2007. He is best known for playing Mr. Jacquel/Anubis on American Gods and Klingon captain T’Kuvma in Star Trek: Discovery. Other television roles include Trial & Retribution, Doctor Who, Roots, 3Below: Tales of Arcadia, and Strike Back Revolution.

== Early life ==
Obi was born in London to an Igbo father. He studied at the Drama Centre London and later trained students at Actor in Session, where he serves as artistic director.

== Career ==
Obi's professional theater debut was as a Messenger in Edward Hall's production of Macbeth in 2002 in the West End He plays Mr. Jacquel/Anubis in American Gods. Obi played Klingon captain T’Kuvma in Star Trek: Discovery.

== Personal life ==
One of Obi's best friends is actor Charlie Cox.

== Filmography ==
=== Film ===
Year	Title	Role	Notes
2002	Anita and Me	Minister	
2003	Collusion	3rd Merchant Banker	
2004	The Calcium Kid	Pressman	
2005	Animal	DJ	
2010	Burke and Hare	John Martin	
2012	Snow White and the Huntsman	Mirror Man (voice)	
2013	The Counsellor	Malkina's Bodyguard	
2016	The Call Up	The Sergeant	
2017	Ghost in the Shell	Ambassador	

=== Television ===
Year	Title	Role	Notes
2002	Trial & Retribution	Security Officer	Episode #6.2
2005	Look Around You	Anthony Carmichael	Series 2 episode 1: "Music 2000"
2011	Doctor Who	George	Episode: "Closing Time"
2016	Roots	Kintango	Parts 1 and 2
2017	American Gods	Mr. Jacquel / Anubis	3 episodes
2017	Star Trek: Discovery	T’Kuvma	Episodes: "The Vulcan Hello" "Battle at the Binary Stars"
2018–2019	3Below: Tales of Arcadia	Loth Saborian (voice)	
2019	Strike Back: Revolution	Jean-Baptiste Zaza	2 episodes

=== Video games ===
Year	Title	Role	Notes
2011	El Shaddai: Ascension of the Metatron	Uriel	
