= David Semel =

American film and television director

- Occupations: Film director, television director, television producer
- Years active: 1986–present

David Semel is an American film and television director and producer.

Semel joined the Directors Guild of America in 1989. His television directing credits include Studio 60 on the Sunset Strip, Person of Interest, Ally McBeal, Boston Public, 7th Heaven, No Ordinary Family, American Horror Story, Roswell, Angel, Buffy the Vampire Slayer, Watchmen and other series. He also directed and produced episodes of Life, House, American Dreams, Beverly Hills, 90210 and Dawson's Creek.

In 2007, Semel was nominated for a Primetime Emmy Award for Outstanding Directing for a Drama Series for directing the pilot episode of Heroes. He was also nominated the previous year for his producing work on House.

Semel has also directed two feature films, Campfire Tales (1997) and Lone Star State of Mind (2002).

He also directed the 2017 series premiere of Star Trek: Discovery, "The Vulcan Hello".
