= Sarek =

Fictional Star Trek character

- Star Trek character
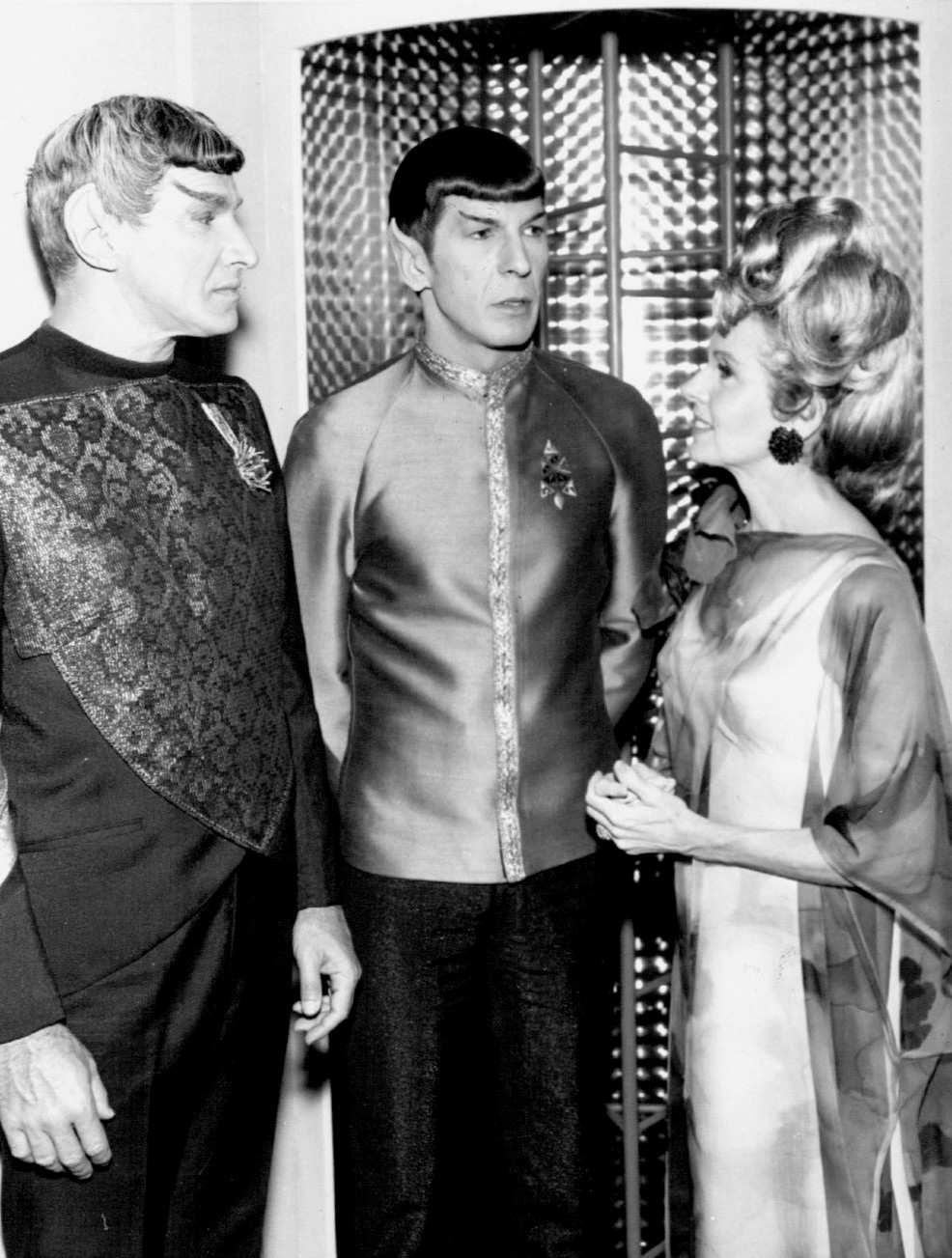
- Mark Lenard as Sarek (left) and Jane Wyatt as Amanda Grayson with Leonard Nimoy as their son, Spock
- First appearance: Mark Lenard: "Journey to Babel" (1967); (The Original Series); James Frain: "Such Sweet Sorrow" (2019); (Discovery)
- Last appearance: Mark Lenard: Star Trek VI: The Undiscovered Country (1991); James Frain: "Light and Shadows" (2019) (Discovery)
- Created by: D.C. Fontana
- Portrayed by: Mark Lenard (1967–1991); Jonathan Simpson (1989); Ben Cross (2009 film); James Frain (2017–2019)
- Voiced by: Mark Lenard ("Yesteryear")

In-universe information
- Full name: S'chn T'gai Sarek
- Species: Vulcan
- Gender: Male
- Title: Sarek
- Family: Skon (father); Solkar (grandfather)
- Spouses: Amanda Grayson; Perrin Landover
- Children: Spock (son); Sybok (son); Michael Burnham (adoptive daughter)

Sarek /ˈsærɛk/ is a fictional character in the Star Trek media franchise. He is a Vulcan astrophysicist, the Vulcan ambassador to the United Federation of Planets, and father of Spock. The character was originally played by Mark Lenard in the episode "Journey to Babel" in 1967. Lenard later voiced Sarek in the animated series, and appeared in Star Trek films and the series Star Trek: The Next Generation.

Actor Jonathan Simpson played a younger Sarek in a brief scene in Star Trek V: The Final Frontier, with voice-over provided by Lenard. Ben Cross portrayed Sarek in the 2009 Star Trek film. James Frain plays Sarek in the television series Star Trek: Discovery.

The character appears in the original Star Trek series, the animated series, five Star Trek films, two episodes of Star Trek: The Next Generation, Star Trek: Discovery and numerous Star Trek novels and comics.

== Character biography ==
=== Star Trek: The Original Series ===
Sarek was born in 2165. He is the son of Skon of Vulcan and the grandson of Solkar (the first Vulcan ambassador to Earth). Sarek was married twice, and had two sons. Prior to his first marriage, he had a relationship with a Vulcan princess which produced Sarek's first son Sybok, a character not developed until the fifth feature film in the late 1980s. Sarek later married Amanda Grayson, a native of the planet Earth, with whom he had Spock. After Amanda's death, Sarek married Perrin, also human, who survived his death. Sarek and Perrin had no children together.

Sarek's second son, Spock, entered Starfleet Academy. Sarek opposed the decision because he wanted Spock to enter the Vulcan Science Academy which he had arranged for years before and the two were estranged for 18 years. Following a mission on the Enterprise where Spock helped save Sarek's life, father and son are reconciled in the episode "Journey to Babel", with Mark Lenard portraying the first appearance of Sarek.

=== Animated series ===
Mark Lenard voiced Sarek in the Star Trek: The Animated Series episode "Yesteryear". In this episode, Spock must travel back in time to his childhood, and keep his younger self from dying and being replaced by an Andorian as First Officer of the Enterprise. Spock, posing as a relative, meets a younger version of Sarek.

=== TOS films ===
Mark Lenard portrayed Sarek in movies based on the original Star Trek series. In Star Trek III: The Search for Spock (1984), Sarek confronts James T. Kirk at his apartment, thinking that Spock placed his katra, or living essence, into Kirk's mind (since Kirk was the last person to be with the dying Spock), and asking Kirk why he did not return Spock to Vulcan. Unknown to either Sarek or Kirk, Spock had actually placed his katra in the mind of his friend Leonard McCoy for safekeeping. Kirk later discovers this through the security tapes during the last moments of Spock's life in his fight to save the Enterprise from Khan. Sarek asks Kirk to bring Spock's body back along with his katra to Vulcan; Kirk promises to do so. The Genesis Device regenerates Spock's body and restores his life; Kirk and his crew manage to get Spock off the planet and return him to his home planet of Vulcan. There, Sarek asks the priestess T'Lar to perform a fal-tor-pan, reuniting Spock's mind and body. Sarek thanks Kirk for the rescue of Spock, which took place at the expense of the destruction of the Enterprise and the death of Kirk's son. Kirk admitted if he did not try to save Spock, he would have faced a deeper guilt in his soul.

Star Trek IV: The Voyage Home (1986) begins with Kirk, Spock, and the rest of the Enterprise crew still in exile on Vulcan. Sarek travels to Earth to speak on behalf of Kirk (who is facing charges from the Klingon Empire), and is subsequently trapped on the planet when Earth is threatened by destruction by an alien probe. After Kirk and his crew return and save Earth, and are largely exonerated at their subsequent trial, Sarek has a private audience with his son. Sarek states that he is pleased with Spock, and admits that he was wrong in opposing Spock's induction into Starfleet, praising his comrades as people of good character.

Actor Jonathan Simpson briefly played a younger Sarek during Star Trek V: The Final Frontier (1989), with a voice-over provided by Lenard. The scene is in reference to Spock's birth and Sarek remarking he is "so human."

Mark Lenard's final filmed appearance in the role of Sarek was in Star Trek VI: The Undiscovered Country (1991). This film was recorded after, but released before, his last broadcast appearance in The Next Generation. It takes place in the time period of the original series, in the year 2293. Sarek is once again shown as a diplomat participating in the Khitomer Conference, the first diplomatic meeting between the Klingons and the Federation.

=== Star Trek: The Next Generation ===
Lenard made two appearances as the character in Star Trek: The Next Generation. In the first, in an episode named after him, Sarek suffers from Bendii syndrome, an incurable and terminal neurological degenerative illness that causes him to lose control of his emotions. For example, when Data and a quartet play Brahms' first sextet, second movement, he is moved to tears. Having established a mind meld with Captain Jean-Luc Picard, Sarek is able to continue with an important diplomatic mission, but his emotions are expressed through Picard, among them his deep love for Amanda, Spock, and his current human wife Perrin, causing Picard to almost go insane. His death from Bendii syndrome occurs in the first part of the TNG episode "Unification".

=== Star Trek (2009) ===
Sarek, played by Ben Cross, appears in the Star Trek reboot (2009). Though respectful of Spock's ability to make his own choices, Sarek clearly encourages him to maintain his logical Vulcan nature. Sarek maintains that he married Amanda because it was logical to do so, since as the Vulcan ambassador, it would of course fall upon Sarek to observe human behavior. Later, Sarek is on the board of the Vulcan Science Academy, and is disappointed to learn that his son has turned down admission in favor of joining Starfleet.

When the vengeful Romulan captain, Nero, makes clear his intention to destroy Vulcan, Spock arrives to transport Sarek, Amanda, and the rest of the Vulcan council to safety; however, Amanda is lost in the attempt. When Cadet Kirk provokes Spock to force him to relinquish command, it is only Sarek's stern "Spock!" that calms the enraged half-Vulcan. When Spock leaves the bridge, Sarek is clearly displeased by the events and follows him. Sarek advises Spock that if he feels anger (at Vulcan's destruction and Amanda's death), then he should not try to hide it. Sarek also admits to his son: "You once asked me why I married your mother... I married her because I loved her." Sarek affirms to his son that not all Vulcans are as emotionless as they appear to be; even Sarek is painfully grieved over the loss of his beloved wife. At this moment, father and son have reconciled as they grieve together over the losses of their world and loved ones, before Spock leaves to stop Nero from destroying Earth and to avenge his mother's untimely death.

=== Star Trek: Discovery ===
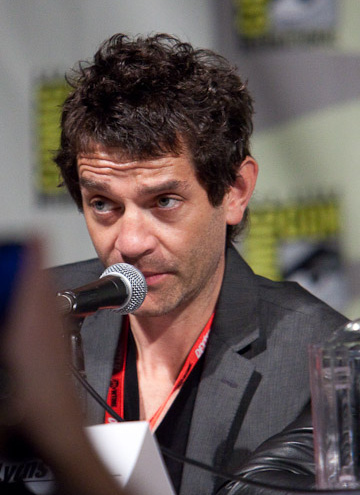
Frain in July 2010

James Frain played the role of Sarek in Star Trek: Discovery.

== Family relationships ==
Spock's ongoing conflict between emotion and logic is countered by his parents, Sarek and human Amanda Grayson, a seemingly loving and devoted couple. The character of Sarek and his relationship with Spock and Amanda have been explored in depth in amateur fiction, several authorized novels, and in the animated episode "Yesteryear". Movies and episodes of Star Trek: The Next Generation have also added to background on these relationships. Spock and Sarek's relationship is formal and respectful, but strained. Captain Jean-Luc Picard, who mind melded with Sarek before he died, also mind melds with Spock in order to share Sarek's thoughts and feelings about his son. Little is known about Sarek's relationship with his oldest son Sybok, but presumably it was a difficult one since Sybok rejected Vulcan ways and was banished from the planet.

Sarek's adoptive daughter Michael Burnham was introduced in Star Trek: Discovery. Sarek in many ways is closer to Burnham because he shared part of his katra with her. Still, when forced to choose between Spock and Burnham, Sarek favored his biological son. This is a central theme of the Discovery episode "Lethe", in which Sarek attempts to have both of his children accepted to the Vulcan Expeditionary Group, but is told that only one could be chosen. Sarek ultimately chose Spock, who opted to join Starfleet instead, rendering Sarek's decision futile and causing him to feel terrible guilt over having to make the choice (and over misleading Burnham about her application since he had originally told her that she was rejected).

== Mirror Universe ==
The Mirror Universe counterpart of Sarek appeared in the Discovery episode "The Wolf Inside", in which he is a member of the rebellion against the Terran Empire. (Like Spock's mirror counterpart, this Sarek sports a Van Dyke beard.) He is revered as a prophet by the other rebels, due to his Vulcan mental abilities. Unlike the regular universe Sarek, this version never adopted Michael Burnham and has never met her before. When Burnham arrives at the rebel encampment and claims to want to assist the rebellion, the rebels assume she is her own mirror counterpart (who has orders to eliminate the rebels), but Sarek performs a mind meld and pronounces that she is telling the truth.

== Appearances ==
Sarek appears in the following episodes and films:

Star Trek: The Original Series

- "Journey to Babel"

Star Trek: The Animated Series

- "Yesteryear"

Star Trek films

- Star Trek III: The Search for Spock
- Star Trek IV: The Voyage Home
- Star Trek V: The Final Frontier
- Star Trek VI: The Undiscovered Country
- Star Trek

Star Trek: The Next Generation

- "Sarek"
- "Unification, Part I"

Star Trek: Discovery

- "The Vulcan Hello"
- "Battle at the Binary Stars"
- "Lethe"
- "The Wolf Inside" (mirror)
- "The War Without, The War Within"
- "Will You Take My Hand?"
- "Light and Shadows"

== Reception ==
In 2009, IGN ranked Sarek as the 13th best character of Star Trek overall. In 2015, SyFy rated Sarek as among the top 21 most interesting supporting characters of Star Trek.

In 2016, Screen Rant rated Sarek as the 11th best character in Star Trek overall as presented in television series and films up to that time, highlighting the character's relationship with his son Spock. They note how Sarek appears across multiple incarnations of Star Trek, and both Spock and Sarek try to understand each other and their own feelings.

In 2017, Den of Geek ranked Mark Lenard's Sarek as the number one best guest acting performance on Star Trek: The Next Generation, for his performances in "Sarek" and "Unification, Part I".

In 2018, CBR ranked Sarek the 5th best recurring character of all Star Trek, noting strong performances by Mark Lenard and multiple appearances across different films and shows.
