= James Frain =

English stage and screen actor

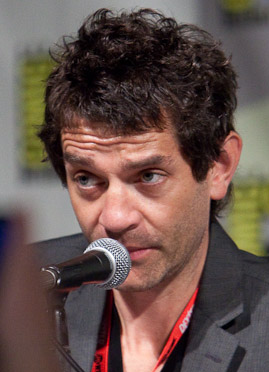
- Frain at the 2010 San Diego Comic-Con
- Born: 14 March 1968 (age 58); Leeds, West Riding of Yorkshire, England
- Education: Newport Free Grammar School; University of East Anglia; Central School of Speech and Drama
- Occupation: Actor
- Years active: 1993–present
- Spouse: Marta Cunningham (m. 2004; sep. 2023)
- Children: 2

James Frain (born 14 March 1968) is an English actor. His best known television roles include Thomas Cromwell in the Showtime/CBC historical drama The Tudors (2007–2009), Franklin Mott in the HBO drama True Blood (2010), Warwick the Kingmaker in the BBC drama serial The White Queen (2013), John Sumner in the Sky/Canal+ crime drama The Tunnel (2013), Ferdinand Chevalier in the BBC/Space sci-fi thriller Orphan Black (2015–2017), Theo Galavan/Azrael in Fox's Gotham (2015–2016), and Sarek in Star Trek: Discovery (2017–2019).

In film, he is best known for playing Daniel Barenboim and Álvaro de la Quadra in the biographical dramas Hilary and Jackie and Elizabeth, respectively (both 1998), Bassianus in the Shakespeare adaptation Titus (1999), and Gérard de Villefort in the historical drama The Count of Monte Cristo (2002).

== Early life and education ==
James Frain was born in Leeds, West Riding of Yorkshire, and brought up in Stansted Mountfitchet, Essex near Bishop's Stortford, Hertfordshire, the eldest of eight children of a teacher mother and a stockbroker father.

He was educated at Newport Free Grammar School, studied Drama and Film at the University of East Anglia, and trained as an actor at the Central School of Speech and Drama in London.

== Career ==
=== Screen ===
In 1993, while in his final year of drama school, Frain made his film debut in Shadowlands, after being spotted by the film director Richard Attenborough. In 1995, He starred as a Northern Irish terrorist in the Thaddeus O'Sullivan directed film, Nothing Personal.

In 2000, he was nominated for Canadian Screen Award for Best Supporting Actor at the Academy of Canadian Cinema and Television's 20th Genie Awards in Toronto, for his performance as Gustave Sonnenschein in the István Szabó directed film Sunshine.

Frain has also appeared in a number of television series, including Soldier Soldier (1993); Armadillo (2001); 24 (2005); Invasion (2006); and The Closer (2006). He played Thomas Cromwell in Showtime's The Tudors; the villainous billionaire "Chess" in the NBC superhero/crime drama series The Cape; heroic Templar Sir Gregory in the Syfy original film Dark Relic (2010); and vampire Franklin Mott in the HBO drama True Blood. In season 2 of Grimm, Frain joined the cast as a mysterious recurring character named Eric Renard.

He appeared in the second season of Gotham as Azrael, and portrayed Sarek, the father of Spock, on Star Trek: Discovery, the second prequel TV series in the Star Trek franchise.

=== Stage ===
Frain has been a regular on the stage in the United Kingdom, appearing with the Royal Shakespeare Company and Royal Court Theatre, as well as on the West End. He has also appeared on Broadway in New York. He was a recipient of the 2008 Drama Desk Award for Outstanding Ensemble Performances along with the rest of the cast of The Homecoming (2007).

== Personal life ==
In 2004, Frain married director Marta Cunningham; they have two children. The couple announced their separation in February 2023.

== Filmography ==
=== Film ===
Year	Title	Role	Notes
1993	Shadowlands	Peter Whistler	
1995	An Awfully Big Adventure	John Harbour	
1995	Nothing Personal	Kenny	
1995	Bruised Fruit	Dan	Short film
1996	Loch Ness	Adrian Foote	
1997	Red Meat	Victor	
1997	Robinson Crusoe	Robert	
1998	What Rats Won't Do	Jack	
1998	Hilary and Jackie	Daniel Barenboim	
1998	Elizabeth	Álvaro de la Quadra	
1998	Vigo: A Passion for Life	Jean Vigo	
1999	Sunshine	Gustave Sonnenschein	
1999	Titus	Bassianus	
2000	Zero Eight		Short film
2000	Reindeer Games	Nick Cassidy	
2000	The Miracle Maker	Thomas (voice)	
2000	Where the Heart Is	Forney Hull	
2002	The Count of Monte Cristo	J.F. Villefort	
2005	Into the Blue	Reyes	
2006	The Front Line	Eddie Gilroy	
2008	Quid Pro Quo	Father Dave	
2009	Everybody's Fine	Tom	
2010	Tron: Legacy	Jarvis	
2011	Water for Elephants	Rosie's Caretaker	
2012	Transit	Marek	
2012	Bert and Dickie	Jack Beresford	
2013	All Things to All Men	Attorney General	
2013	The Lone Ranger	Barret	
2013	Alpha Alert	Andrews	
2014	Born of War	Simon	
2015	Olivia Martha Ilse	William Bailey	Short film
2016	The Architect	Miles Moss	
2019	Against the Clock	Dr. A	
2021	Escape Room: Tournament of Champions	Henry	Extended cut version

=== Television ===
Year	Title	Role	Notes
1993	Soldier Soldier	Lt. Giles Chapman	Episode: "Disintegration"
1993	Prime Suspect 3	Jason Baldwin	Miniseries
1995	Devil's Advocate	Doctor Vesti	TV movie
1995	The Buccaneers	Julius Folyat	Miniseries
1996	Rasputin: Dark Servant of Destiny	Prince Felix Yusupov	TV movie
1996	Tales from the Crypt	Elliot	Episode: "Report from the Grave"
1996	Strangers	Dirk	Episode: "Ceremony"
1997	The Mill on the Floss	Philip Wakem	TV movie
1997	Macbeth on the Estate	Macbeth	TV movie
2000	Arabian Nights	Schahzenan/Harun al-Rashid	Miniseries
2001	Armadillo	Lorimer Black	Miniseries
2001	The Vice	Gordon Ellis	Episode: "Trade"
2002	Path to War	Richard N. Goodwin	TV movie
2002	The Project	Harvey	TV movie
2003	Leonardo	Cesare Borgia	Miniseries
2004	Spartacus	David	Miniseries
2004	Pilot Season	Jeremy Pilodes	Miniseries
2005	24	Paul Raines	10 episodes
2005	Strong Medicine	Art Gallery Painter	Episode: "Clinical Risk"
2005	Empire	Marcus Junius Brutus	Miniseries
2005	Medium	Calley	Episode: "Light Sleeper"
2005	Threshold	Reverend Lavory	Episode: "Revelations"
2006	Invasion	Eli Szura	Recurring
2006	The Closer	Paul Andrews	Episode: "Critical Missing"
2007	Numbers	Allister McClair	Episode: "The Janus List"
2007–2009	The Tudors	Thomas Cromwell	Main role; 24 episodes
2008	Law & Order: Criminal Intent	Dean Holiday	Episode: "Vanishing Act"
2008–2009	Fringe	Salman Kohl	2 episodes
2009	In Plain Sight	Phillip Ashmore/Phillip Andrews	Episode: "Once a Ponzi Time"
2009	Grey's Anatomy	Tom Crowley	Episode: "I Always Feel Like Somebody's Watchin' Me"
2009	Lie to Me	Lance McClellan	Episode: "Grievous Bodily Harm"
2009	Law & Order: Special Victims Unit	Martin Gold	Episode: "Users"
2009	Californication	Paul Rider	Episode: "Mia Culpa"
2009–2010	FlashForward	Dr. Gordon Myhill	2 episodes
2010	CSI: Crime Scene Investigation	Jeffrey Hughes	Episode: "Sin City Blue"
2010	Dark Relic	Sir Gregory	TV movie
2010	Miami Medical	Brian	Episode: "Man on the Road"
2010	Leverage	John Douglas Keller	Episode: "The King George Job"
2010	True Blood	Franklin Mott	8 episodes
2010	CSI: Miami	Richard Ellison	Episode: "Sudden Death"
2011	The Cape	Peter Fleming/Chess	Main cast
2011	Burn Notice	James Forte	Episode: "Eye for an Eye"
2012	The Mentalist	Terry Murphy	Episode: "At First Blush"
2012–2013	Grimm	Eric Renard	8 episodes
2013	The White Queen	Warwick the Kingmaker	Miniseries
2013	Sleepy Hollow	Rutelidge	Episode: "The Sin Eater"
2013	The Tunnel	John Sumner	Main role; 4 episodes
2014	Reckless	Stanford Ashby	Episode: "When the Smoke Clears"
2014	Intruders	Richard Shepherd	Main cast
2015	Agent Carter	Leet Brannis	2 episodes
2015	True Detective	Kevin Burris	Main role; 7 episodes
2015–2016	Gotham	Theo Galavan/Azrael	Main role; 16 episodes
2015–2017	Orphan Black	Ferdinand Chevalier	8 episodes
2017	Hawaii Five-0	Sebastian Wake	Episode: "Kama' oma' o ka 'aina huli hana"
2017–2019	Star Trek: Discovery	Sarek	Recurring role
2019	The Twilight Zone	Agent Allendale	Episode: "Point of Origin"
2019	Elementary	Odin Reichenbach	7 episodes
2020	What We Do in the Shadows	Black Peter	Episode: "Witches"
2021	Showtrial	Sir Damian Campbell	Mini-Series
2023	Quantum Leap	Gideon Rydge	
2026	NCIS	John Smith	Season 24 Episode 6 - Ride or Die

=== Video games ===
Year	Title	Role
2010	Tron: Evolution	Zuse
2021	Call of Duty: Vanguard	Major Henry Hamms

=== Theatre ===
Year	Play	Role	Venue	Notes
1991	All for Love	Myris	Almeida Theatre, London	
1992	The Rules of the Game	Giorgo	Almeida Theatre, London	
1993	She Stoops to Conquer	George Hastings	Queen's Theatre, London	with Peter Hall Company
1995	Zenobia	Wahballat	Young Vic, London	with Royal Shakespeare Company
2000	Other People	Mark	Royal Court Theatre, London	
2001	King Lear	Edmund	Almeida Theatre, London	
2007	The Homecoming	Teddy	Cort Theatre, New York City	
2019	The King's Speech	Lionel Logue	Chicago Shakespeare Theater, Chicago	
