= Aaron Harberts =

American TV writer and producer

- Born: January 20, 1973 (age 53); Iowa
- Education: Northwestern University
- Occupation: Writer/producer
- Partner: Scott (1996–present)
- Writing career
- Years active: 1998–present

Aaron Harberts (born January 20, 1973) is an American television writer and producer. He was a co-showrunner of CBS's Star Trek: Discovery with Gretchen J. Berg until their departure in June 2018. Harberts and Berg have been writing/producing partners since they met as students at Northwestern University. In 2019, Aaron Harberts and Gretchen Berg teamed up again as writers and executive producers for Zoey's Extraordinary Playlist on NBC.

== Career ==
Harberts and Berg's first staff writing job was on the ninth season of Beverly Hills, 90210 in 1998. When 90210 finished after its tenth season they were offered a producing role on Roswell which was then starting its second season. At the end of Roswell's production they started work on Wonderfalls where they met Bryan Fuller who would later hire them to work on Pushing Daisies and Star Trek: Discovery. They also wrote for and/or served as executive producers on Mercy, Off the Map, GCB, Revenge and Reign, and created their own series Pepper Dennis.

In 2001, Harberts and Berg did three rewrites for the 2001 film Valentine which helped to get the film a green light. But at the time they were just starting work on Roswell so were unavailable for further rewrites and other writers took over.

Harberts and Berg were initially brought onto the staff of Star Trek: Discovery in 2016 by its creator and initial showrunner Bryan Fuller as executive producers. When Fuller left to concentrate on American Gods and a planned reboot of Amazing Stories, they were offered the chance to take on the showrunner role. But Harberts and Berg were later fired from the show due to alleged infighting and verbal altercations during production, with Harberts allegedly shouting expletives at a fellow writer.

As of July 2019, Harberts and Berg continue to work together as writers and executive producers for the current NBC hit show Zoey's Extraordinary Playlist. Berg and Harberts help navigate the decisions Zoey must make regarding whether to reveal her secrets, and the resulting impacts on her relationships. The characters on this hour-long musical drama express their inner-most feelings and desires to Zoey through frequent musical numbers. The first episode aired January 7, 2020.

== Personal life ==
Harberts is openly gay and married, having been with his partner Scott since 1996.
