= Gretchen J. Berg =

American writer and television producer

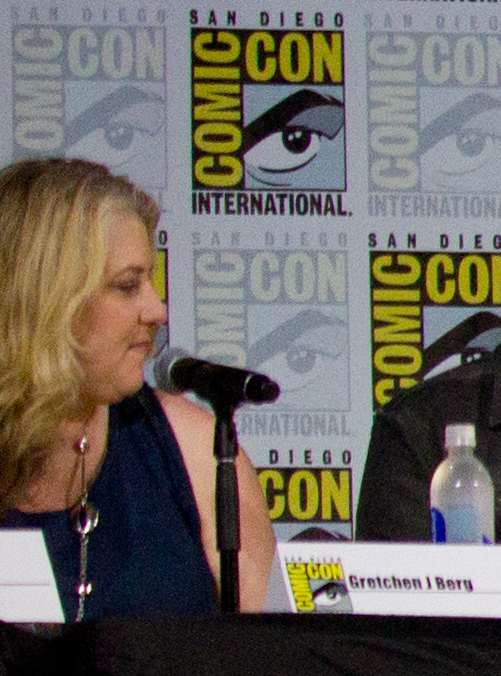
- Gretchen J. Berg in Star Trek: Discovery panel at San Diego Comic-Con 2017
- Born: February 8, 1971 (age 55); Pittsburgh, Pennsylvania
- Other name: Gretchen Berg
- Education: Northwestern University
- Occupation: Writer/producer

Gretchen J. Berg (born February 8, 1971) is an American writer and television producer. She has worked extensively with her writer and producing partner Aaron Harberts on a number of television series including Pushing Daisies and Revenge. She was also one of the showrunners of Star Trek: Discovery alongside Harberts until their departure in June 2018. In 2019, the team of Gretchen J. Berg and Aaron Harberts joined Zoey's Extraordinary Playlist on NBC as writers and executive producers.

== Career ==
Gretchen J. Berg was born in Pittsburgh, Pennsylvania, and went on to attend Northwestern University. While there, she met future writing and producing partner Aaron Harberts. Their first work was on Beverly Hills, 90210. Together the pair created the series Pepper Dennis on The WB and worked as executive producers. Berg and Harberts were also co-executive producers on Pushing Daisies and co-showrunners on the medical drama Mercy. In 2010, Berg and Harberts agreed a deal with the studio ABC in 2010 under a two-year deal, initially as executive producers on the midseason replacement Off the Map. The duo became showrunners of the drama GCB, through their deal with ABC.

Berg and Harberts worked with Mark Gordon in pitching work to television studios in 2012, with sales to both ABC and NBC. Their deal with ABC was extended for a further two years in 2013, and moved to become executive producers from season three onwards of Revenge, where they previously had been consulting producers. Berg and Harberts were recruited as executive producers on Star Trek: Discovery, under showrunner Bryan Fuller. The trio had previously worked on Pushing Daisies together. They were two of several executive producers, alongside Heather Kadin and Akiva Goldsman. When Fuller stepped back from the showrunner role on Discovery, Berg and Harberts were promoted into the position together. But Berg and Harberts were later fired from Star Trek: Discovery due to alleged infighting and verbal altercations during production, with Harberts allegedly shouting expletives at a fellow writer.

Gretchen J. Berg and Aaron Harberts' most recent project is the current NBC musical comedy-drama series Zoey's Extraordinary Playlist. As an executive producing and writing team, Berg and Harberts help navigate the decisions Zoey must make regarding whether to reveal her secrets, and the resulting impacts on her relationships. The characters on this hour-long musical drama express their inner-most feelings and desires to Zoey through frequent musical numbers. The first episode aired January 7, 2020.
