= Mark Zuckerberg book club =

Club on Facebook

Mark Zuckerberg book club (a.k.a. A Year of Books) was an online book club hosted by Mark Zuckerberg through his personal Facebook account started in January 2015. Zuckerberg made a book recommendation every two weeks for a year to his millions of Facebook followers.

Zuckerberg came up with the idea as part of his New Year's resolution for 2015 after Cynthia Greco, the Audience Development Manager for MediaOnePA/York Newspaper Company, suggested that Zuckerberg read a new book every month. Zuckerberg modified the idea to one book every two weeks and books which "emphasize learning about new cultures, beliefs, histories and technologies."

== Book club selections ==
#	Date	Author	Title	Ref.
1	January 2, 2015	Moisés Naím	The End of Power: From Boardrooms to Battlefields and Churches to States, Why Being In Charge Isn’t What It Used to Be	
2	January 18, 2015	Steven Pinker	The Better Angels of Our Nature: Why Violence Has Declined	
3	February 2, 2015	Sudhir Venkatesh	Gang Leader for a Day: A Rogue Sociologist Takes to the Streets	
4	February 18, 2015	Eula Biss	On Immunity: An Inoculation	
5	March 3, 2015	Ed Catmull	Creativity, Inc.: Overcoming the Unseen Forces That Stand in the Way of True Inspiration	
6	March 17, 2015	Thomas Kuhn	The Structure of Scientific Revolutions	
7	March 31, 2015	Michael Chwe	Rational Ritual: Culture, Coordination, and Common Knowledge	
8	April 15, 2015	Hank Paulson	Dealing With China: An Insider Unmasks the New Economic Superpower	
9	April 28, 2015	Peter W. Huber	Orwell's Revenge: The 1984 Palimpsest	
10	May 14, 2015	Michelle Alexander	The New Jim Crow: Mass Incarceration in the Age of Colorblindness	
11	June 1, 2015	Ibn Khaldun	Muqaddimah	
12	June 15, 2015	Yuval Harari	Sapiens: A Brief History of Humankind	
13	June 29, 2015	Iain Banks	The Player of Games	
14	July 14, 2015	Vaclav Smil	Energy: A Beginner's Guide	
15	July 28, 2015	Matt Ridley	Genome: The Autobiography of a Species in 23 Chapters	
16	August 12, 2015	William James	The Varieties of Religious Experience: A Study in Human Nature	
17	September 1, 2015	Daryl Collins, Jonathan Morduch, Stuart Rutherford	Portfolios of the Poor: How the World's Poor Live on $2 a Day	
18	September 16, 2015	Daron Acemoğlu, James A. Robinson	Why Nations Fail: The Origins of Power, Prosperity, and Poverty	
19	September 29, 2015	Matt Ridley	The Rational Optimist: How Prosperity Evolves	
20	October 21, 2015	Liu Cixin	The Three-Body Problem	
21	November 9, 2015	Jon Gertner	The Idea Factory: Bell Labs and the Great Age of American Innovation	
22	December 10, 2015	Henry Kissinger	World Order	
23	December 28, 2015	David Deutsch	The Beginning of Infinity: Explanations that Transform the World	

== Reception ==
The Atlantic wrote that it "has the potential to be Oprahesque in its influence on book sales", in reference to the Oprah Book Club after the first selection by Moisés Naím caused Amazon's stock to sell out. An article in The New Yorker made a similar comparison to Oprah. The Associated Press noted that the second selection by Steven Pinker did not result in any increase in sales according to Nielsen BookScan data.
