= Her Body and Other Parties =

2017 short story collection by Carmen Maria Machado

- First edition
- Author: Carmen Maria Machado
- Language: English
- Genre: Short stories
- Publisher: Graywolf Press
- Publication date: October 3, 2017
- Publication place: United States
- Media type: Paperback
- Pages: 264
- ISBN: 978-1-55597-788-7

Her Body and Other Parties is a 2017 short story collection by Carmen Maria Machado, published by Graywolf Press. The collection won the Shirley Jackson Award, and was a finalist for the National Book Award for Fiction.

The short story "The Resident" was a finalist for the 2017 Shirley Jackson Award. "The Husband Stitch" was a finalist for the 2014 Nebula Award for Best Novelette.

== Content ==
Story	Originally published in
"The Husband Stitch"	Granta
"Inventory"	Strange Horizons
"Mothers"	Interfictions
Especially Heinous	The American Reader
"Real Women Have Bodies"	Original
"Eight Bites"	Gulf Coast
"The Resident"	Original
"Difficult At Parties"	Unstuck

== Stories ==
=== "The Husband Stitch" ===
Winner of the 2014 Nebula novelette award, "The Husband Stitch" is the introducing short story in Her Body and Other Parties. Machado originally published this short story on October 28, 2014 in the prominent UK literary journal Granta. "The Husband Stitch" was then published in Her Body and Other Parties in 2017.

Drawing on old folklore and urban legends like "The Girl with the Green Ribbon" in its depiction by Alvin Schwartz, "The Husband Stitch" is narrated by a woman with a green ribbon around her neck. In the story, all women have a specific location and color to their ribbon. The narrator talks the reader through her sexual explorations, marriage, motherhood, and the extent to which the "good" men in her life lead to her demise.

The short story begins at a party where the narrator meets her future husband and the father to her child. Upon meeting the boy at the party, the two fall madly in love, and they freely explore each other's sexual desires. However, the narrator has set boundaries in terms of what she allows from him. One of her two rules in their relationship is that he must never touch or untie her ribbon. Despite her objections, her husband becomes obsessed with trying to touch and loosen the ribbon and tries at any chance he can get. This problem only gets worse for her when she gives birth to their son, as he also becomes increasingly curious about her ribbon.

Hoping to raise her son to become a better man, the narrator retells passed down urban legends told in the female perspective to him. With time, the stories become less frequently told, and her son becomes less and less interested. Similarly, it becomes increasingly hard for the narrator to keep her husband from touching her ribbon. Eventually, the narrator allows her ribbon to be untied, and the consequences that follow are life-changing.

==== Themes ====
Critic Mary Hood explains that in "The Husband Stitch", "female desire is an important theme" However, Hood offers that while "female desire is present, it is always secondary to male desire." So, the self-sacrifice women must make in a male dominated world is revealed in this story. Shana E. Hadi in The Stanford Daily notes the significance of the title "The Husband Stitch," "which references a post-birth medical procedure to tighten the vagina and give the man additional pleasure during intercourse, despite the woman's pain." Likewise, the narrator goes through this procedure after giving birth to her son. This may hint at the idea that she gives everything she can to her husband, even including his eventual access to her ribbon.

=== "Especially Heinous" ===
In an interview with The Paris Review, Machado talked about her inspiration for the novella Especially Heinous where she re-imagined episodes of Law & Order: SVU: "My initial idea was to rewrite the existing episode descriptions in slightly surreal versions. So I looked up the little capsule descriptions of the episodes, and I was trying to manipulate them to make them surreal, but it was too restrictive. Then I realized that all the titles are one-word titles. And what if I just use the titles? I put only the titles all in a row, and then just started writing and imagining Benson and Stabler."

== Literary significance and reception ==
Parul Sehgal of The New York Times wrote, "It's a wild thing, this book, covered in sequins and scales, blazing with the influence of fabulists from Angela Carter to Kelly Link and Helen Oyeyemi, and borrowing from science fiction, queer theory and horror." A review in Slate said, "In eight searingly original stories, Machado uses the literary techniques of horror and science fiction to expose the truth about our modern parables: that they're as grotesque and enchanting as any classic fairy tale."

Novelist Kathleen Rooney, writing in the Chicago Tribune, wrote, "In her twistedly original and thrilling debut short story collection, Her Body and Other Parties, Carmen Maria Machado blends both the terrifying and the horrible into a psychologically realistic and darkly comic mixture."

An NPR review also compared her to Angela Carter, and concluded, "Machado seems to answer: The world makes madwomen, and the least you can do is make sure the attic is your own."

Writing for the Los Angeles Times, Ellie Robbins described Machado's collection as "that hallowed thing: an example of almost preposterous talent that also encapsulates something vital but previously diffuse about the moment." Robbins concluded her review by praising the author, "In 'Her Body and Other Parties,' Machado reveals just how original, subversive, proud and joyful it can be to write from deep in the gut, even — especially — if the gut has been bruised."

== Awards ==
Year	Award	Category	Result	Ref
2017	Bisexual Book Award	Fiction	Won	
2017	Kirkus Prize	Fiction	Shortlisted	
2017	Los Angeles Times Book Prize	Art Seidenbaum Award	Shortlisted	
2017	National Book Award	Fiction	Finalist	
2017	National Book Critics Circle Award	John Leonard Prize	Won	
2017	Otherwise Award	—	Honor List	
2017	Shirley Jackson Award	Collection	Won	
2017	Publishing Triangle Awards	Edmund White Award	Shortlisted	
2018	Bard Fiction Prize	—	Won	
2018	Brooklyn Public Library Book Prize	Fiction	Won	
2018	Crawford Award	—	Won	
2018	Dylan Thomas Prize	—	Shortlisted	
2018	Indies Choice Book Awards	Adult Debut	Won	
2018	Lambda Literary Award	Lesbian Fiction	Won	
2018	Locus Award	Collection	Finalist	
2018	PEN/Robert W. Bingham Prize	—	Shortlisted	
2018	World Fantasy Award	Collection	Shortlisted	
