= MVP =

MVP most commonly refers to:

- Most Valuable Promotions, a boxing promotion started by influencer Jake Paul
- Most valuable player, an award, typically for the best performing player in a sport or competition
- Minimum viable product, a concept for feature estimating used in business and engineering

MVP may also refer to:

== Places ==
- Fabio Alberto León Bentley Airport (IATA airport code: MVP), an airport in Colombia

== People ==
- Steve Lombardi, professional wrestler better known as the "Brooklyn Brawler", whose alias was once "MVP"
- Michael Page, professional boxer and mixed martial artist, nicknamed "MVP" (Michael Venom Page)
- Manuel V. Pangilinan, or "MVP", a Filipino businessman and sports executive
- Dale Torborg, professional wrestler better known as "The Demon", whose alias was once "MVP"
- Montel Vontavious Porter, or "MVP", the ring name of professional wrestler Hassan Assad

== Organizations ==
- MVP (esports), a Korean esports organization
- Memel People's Party (German: Memelländische Volkspartei), a defunct pro-German political party in the Memel Territory
- Maharashtra Vikas Party, a political party in India
- Most Valuable Party, a political party in Singapore

== Arts, entertainment, and media ==
=== Music ===
- MVP (group), a hip hop group
- MVP (South Korean band), a boy band
- Mark Varney Project, a short-lived jazz fusion group
- MVP (album), a 2020 album by Mister V
- Los MVP, a 2005 album by Angel & Khriz
- "M.V.P." (song), a 1995 single by underground rapper Big L from Lifestylez ov da Poor and Dangerous
- "MVP", a song by the deathcore band Despised Icon which is included on their fourth album Day of Mourning (album)
- "MVP", a song by the band Brockhampton from the Space Jam: A New Legacy soundtrack
- "MVP" a 2024 single by Suicidal Idol, Hubithekid, and Pröz

=== Television ===
- MVP (TV series), a television drama about the lives of hockey players' wives
- MVP, an Australian sport show hosted by basketball star Steve Carfino
- "The M.V.P." (Schitt's Creek), an episode of Schitt's Creek

=== Other uses in arts, entertainment, and media ===
- MVP (novel), a novel by James Boice
- Michael Van Patrick, known as MVP, a comic book character created by Dan Slott and Stefano Caselli for Marvel Comics
- MVP: Most Valuable Primate, a 2000 comedy film

== Computing ==
- Hauppauge MediaMVP, a network media player often shortened to "MVP" (Music, Videos, Pictures)
- Microsoft Most Valuable Professional, an award and recognition program
- Model–view–presenter, a software engineering design and architectural pattern
- Most vexing parse, a specific form of syntactic ambiguity resolution in the C++ programming language

== Science and healthcare ==
- Major vault protein, a primary protein associated with the cytoplasmic vault organelle
- Mean venous pressure, (central venous pressure + peripheral venous pressure) ÷ 2
- Minimum viable population, the minimum sustainable population value used in biology, ecology and conservation biology
- Mitomycin-vindesine-cisplatin, a combination chemotherapy regimen
- Mitral valve prolapse, a heart valve condition

== Other uses ==
- Duri language (ISO 639 code: mvp), an Austronesian language
- Mossberg 100ATR, a trade name for Mossberg Varmint and Predator Rifle, better known as the Mossberg MVP
