= It Came from the Closet =

It Came from the Closet may refer to:

- "It Came from the Closet", an episode of Bump in the Night
- "It Came from the Closet", an episode of Pet Alien
- It Came from the Closet: Queer Reflections on Horror, a collection of essays edited by Joe Vallese
