= Carmen Maria Machado =

American writer (born 1986)

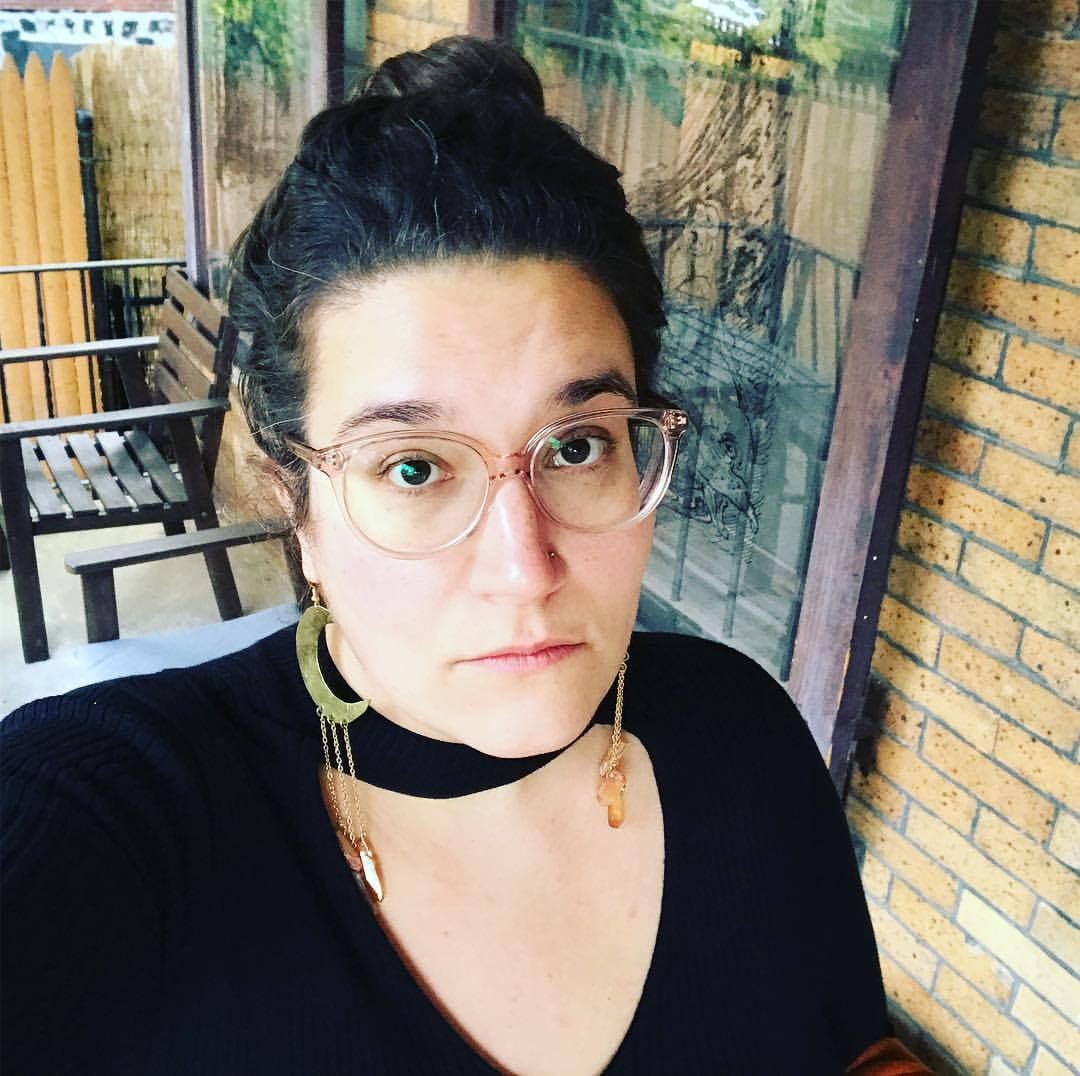
- Machado in 2017
- Born: July 3, 1986 (age 40); Allentown, Pennsylvania, U.S.
- Education: American University (BA); Iowa Writers' Workshop (MFA)
- Occupation: Writer
- Spouse: Val Howlett (separated)
- Writing career
- Language: English
- Years active: 2011–present
- Genres: Science fiction, fantasy, horror
- Notable works: Her Body and Other Parties (2017); In the Dream House (2019)
- Notable awards: National Book Critics Circle Award (2017); Shirley Jackson Award (2017); Crawford Award (2018); Lambda Literary Award (2018); Guggenheim Fellowship (2019); Folio Prize (2021)
- Website: carmenmariamachado.com

Carmen Maria Machado (born July 3, 1986) is an American author, essayist, and critic. She is best known for her short story collection, Her Body and Other Parties, and her memoir, In the Dream House, which won the 2021 Folio Prize.

Machado has been published in The New Yorker, Granta, Lightspeed, and other publications. She has been a finalist for the National Book Award and the Nebula Award for Best Novelette. Her stories have been reprinted in Year's Best Weird Fiction, Best American Science Fiction & Fantasy, Best Horror of the Year, The New Voices of Fantasy, and Best Women's Erotica.

== Early life and education ==
Machado was born July 3, 1986, in Allentown, Pennsylvania. Machado's paternal grandfather left Santa Clara, Cuba, for the United States when he was 18, gaining U.S. citizenship after serving in the Korean War. He then moved to Washington, D.C., where he worked at the U.S. Patent Office and met Machado's grandmother, who came to the U.S. from Austria following World War II.

Machado grew up in a religious United Methodist household, which, she says, led to a sense of guilt for several years about her queer sexuality.

She attended Parkland High School in South Whitehall Township, Pennsylvania, and then American University in Washington, D.C., where she graduated in 2008 with a BA in photography.

She earned an MFA from the Iowa Writers' Workshop in 2012. Machado attended the Clarion Workshop, where she studied under author Ted Chiang.

== Career ==
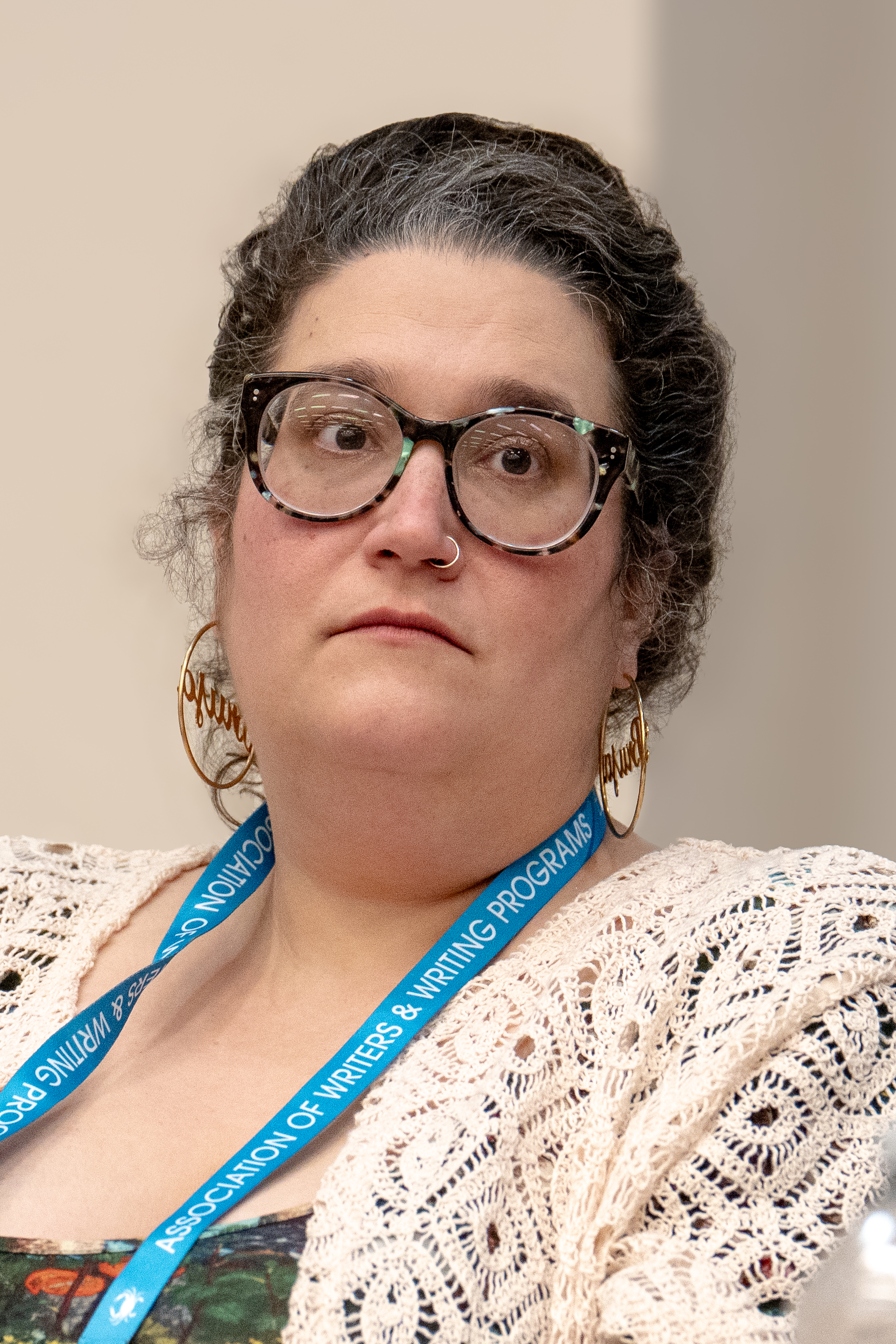
Machado at AWP 2026

Machado worked in the Iowa Writers' Workshop for two years after completing her MFA degree. After a rejection from Starbucks in 2013, she took up work at Lush, a soap store, while she taught writing as an adjunct professor at Rosemont College and other schools in the area. She also did freelance writing while she lived in Pennsylvania.

Machado's short stories, essays, and criticism have been published in The New Yorker, Granta, The Paris Review, Tin House, Lightspeed, Guernica, AGNI, National Public Radio, Los Angeles Review of Books, Strange Horizons, and other publications. Her stories have also been reprinted in anthologies such as Year's Best Dark Fantasy & Horror 2017, Year's Best Weird Fiction, Best American Science Fiction & Fantasy, The Best Horror of the Year, and Best Women's Erotica. Machado's short story, "Horror Story," originally published in Granta in 2015, details a lesbian couple's difficulty coping with a haunting in their new house.

Machado's fiction has been called "strange and seductive", and it has been said that her "work doesn't just have form, it takes form." Her fiction has been a finalist for the Nebula Award for Best Novelette, the Shirley Jackson Award, the Franz Kafka Award in Magic Realism, the storySouth Million Writers Award, and the Calvino Prize from the Creative Writing Program at the University of Louisville. An analysis by io9 indicated that if not for the Sad Puppies ballot manipulation campaign, Machado would have been a finalist for the 2015 John W. Campbell Award for Best New Writer. In 2018, she won the Bard Fiction Prize.

Her horror-inspired short story collection, Her Body and Other Parties, was published by Graywolf Press in 2017. It was a 2017 finalist for the National Book Award for Fiction, won the 2017 National Book Critics Circle Award John Leonard Prize, and was shortlisted for the 2018 Dylan Thomas Prize. The collection has been optioned by FX and a television show is in development by Gina Welch.

In 2018, she was the Writer-in-Residence at the University of Pennsylvania. In 2019, she received a Guggenheim Fellowship. Machado was a visiting associate professor at the Iowa Writers' Workshop in Spring 2021. She has received fellowships and residencies from the Michener-Copernicus Foundation, Elizabeth George Foundation, CINTAS Foundation, Speculative Literature Foundation, University of Iowa, Yaddo, Hedgebrook, and the Millay Colony for the Arts.

Machado was guest editor of The Best American Science Fiction and Fantasy 2019 edition. Her sci-fi short stories have appeared in volumes including Latinx Rising: An Anthology of Latinx Science Fiction and Fantasy, edited by Matthew David Goodwin, with an introduction by Frederick Luis Aldama.

Her essay "Both Ways", about the 2009 film Jennifer's Body, is part of the anthology It Came from the Closet: Queer Reflections on Horror, published in October 2022.

In 2022, Machado announced a new short story collection to be published by Knopf titled A Brief and Fearful Star.

== Personal life ==
Machado is bisexual. She married Val Howlett in 2017. The pair lived in Philadelphia, and maintained a non-monogamous relationship with their partner Marne Litfin in a throuple. Machado and Howlett separated in 2022.

Machado now lives in Brooklyn, New York City.

== Awards and honors ==
Year	Title	Award	Category	Result	Ref
2014	"The Husband Stitch"	Nebula Award	Novelette	Shortlisted	
2014	"The Husband Stitch"	Shirley Jackson Award	Novelette	Shortlisted	
2015	"The Husband Stitch"	Otherwise Award	—	Longlisted	
2015	—	John W. Campbell Award for Best New Writer	—	Longlisted	
2017	"The Resident"	Shirley Jackson Award	Novelette	Finalist	
2017	"Blur"	Shirley Jackson Award	Short Fiction	Finalist	
2017	Her Body and Other Parties	Bisexual Book Award	Fiction	Won	
2017	Her Body and Other Parties	Kirkus Prize	Fiction	Shortlisted	
2017	Her Body and Other Parties	Los Angeles Times Book Prize	Art Seidenbaum Award	Shortlisted	
2017	Her Body and Other Parties	National Book Award	Fiction	Finalist	
2017	Her Body and Other Parties	National Book Critics Circle Award	John Leonard Prize	Won	
2017	Her Body and Other Parties	Otherwise Award	—	Honor List	
2017	Her Body and Other Parties	Shirley Jackson Award	Collection	Won	
2018	Her Body and Other Parties	Bard Fiction Prize	—	Won	
2018	Her Body and Other Parties	Brooklyn Public Library Book Prize	Fiction	Won	
2018	Her Body and Other Parties	Crawford Award	—	Won	
2018	Her Body and Other Parties	Dylan Thomas Prize	—	Shortlisted	
2018	Her Body and Other Parties	Indies Choice Book Awards	Adult Debut	Won	
2018	Her Body and Other Parties	Lambda Literary Award	Lesbian Fiction	Won	
2018	Her Body and Other Parties	Locus Award	Collection	Finalist	
2018	Her Body and Other Parties	PEN/Robert W. Bingham Prize	—	Shortlisted	
2018	Her Body and Other Parties	Publishing Triangle Awards	Edmund White Award	Shortlisted	
2018	Her Body and Other Parties	NAIBA Book of the Year	Fiction	Won	
2018	Her Body and Other Parties	World Fantasy Award	Collection	Shortlisted	
2019	In the Dream House	Bisexual Book Award	Biography and Memoir	Won	
2019	In the Dream House	Goodreads Choice Award	Memoir & Autobiography	Nominated	
2020	In the Dream House	ALA Over the Rainbow Book List	—	Top 10	
2020	In the Dream House	Andrew Carnegie Medal for Excellence	Nonfiction	Longlisted	
2020	In the Dream House	BookTube Prize	Nonfiction	Finalist	
2020	In the Dream House	Goldie Award	General Non-Fiction	Won	
2020	In the Dream House	Heartland Booksellers Award	Nonfiction	Shortlisted	
2020	In the Dream House	Lambda Literary Award	Nonfiction	Won	
2020	In the Dream House	Publishing Triangle Awards	Judy Grahn Award	Won	
2020	In the Dream House	Reading Women Award	Nonfiction	Shortlisted	
2020	In the Dream House	Stonewall Book Award	Israel Fishman Non-Fiction Award	Honor	
2020	In the Dream House	William Saroyan International Prize for Writing	Nonfiction	Shortlisted	
2021	In the Dream House	PEN/John Kenneth Galbraith Award for Nonfiction	—	Longlisted	
2021	In the Dream House	The Writers' Prize/Folio Prize	—	Won	

Machado was awarded the Richard Yates Short Story Prize in 2011 and was named Writer on the Rise by Philadelphia in their Best of Philly awards list.

== Published Works ==
=== Memoir ===
- In the Dream House (Graywolf Press, 2019)

=== Collections ===
- Her Body and Other Parties (Graywolf Press, 2017)

=== Short stories ===
- "Difficult at Parties" (Unstuck, Issue 2, 2012)*
- "Inventory" (Strange Horizons, 2013)*
- "Vacation" (Wigleaf, 2013)
- "Especially Heinous: 272 Views of Law & Order SVU" (The American Reader, Volume 1, 2013)*
- "Miss Laura's School for Esquire Men" (Tin House, 2013)
- "We Were Never Alone in Space" (Shimmer, Issue 17, 2013)
- "The Hungry Earth" (Mothership: Tales from Afrofuturism and Beyond, Rosarium Publishing, 2013)
- "Observations About Eggs from the Man Sitting Next to Me on a Flight from Chicago, Illinois to Cedar Rapids, Iowa" (Lightspeed Magazine, Issue 47, 2014)
- "Help Me Follow My Sister into the Land of the Dead" (Help Fund My Robot Army!!! and Other Improbable Crowdfunding Projects, John Joseph Adams, 2014)
- "We Were Never Men" (The Red Volume: An Anthology of Stories by the Awkward Robots, The Awkward Robots, 2014)
- "The Husband Stitch" (Granta, 2014)*
- "Mothers" (Interfictions, Issue 4, 2014)*
- "Descent" (Nightmare Magazine, Issue 29, 2015)
- "I Bury Myself" (Lady Churchill’s Rosebud Wristlet, No. 33, 2015)
- "Horror Story" (Granta, 2015)
- "The Old Women Who Were Skinned" (Fairy Tale Review, Issue 12, 2016)
- "My Body, Herself" (Uncanny Magazine, Issue 12, 2016)
- "The House at the End of the World" (Fantastic Stories of the Imagination People of Color, Positronic Publishing, 2017)
- "Blur" (Summer Reading, Issue 72, 2017)
- "Promise Me" (Great Jones Street Originals, 2017)
- "Eight Bites " (Gulf Coast, Issue 29.2, 2017)*
- "There and Back Again" (Mixed Up, Skyhorse, 2017)
- "Mary When You Follow Her" (VQR, 2018)
- "A Brief and Fearful Star" (Future Tense, 2018)
- "A Cat, a Bride, a Servant" (Garage, Issue 15, 2018)
- "The Resident" (The Best American Science Fiction and Fantasy 2018, Mariner Books, 2018)*
- "Haunt" (Conjunctions, 2019)
- "The Book of the Dead" (BBC Radio 4, 2019)
- "The Things Eric Eats Before He Eats Himself" (The Mythic Dream, Saga Press, 2019)
- "Relaxation Technique" (McSweeney's Quarterly Concern, Issue 53, 2019)
- "The Lost Performance of the High Priestess of the Temple of Horror" (Granta, 2020)
- "Justice" (The Chronicles of Now, 2020)
- "A Hundred Miles and a Mile" (When Things Get Dark, Titan Books, 2021)
- "Bloody Summer" (Amazon Original Stories, 2022)
- "Endlings" (Conjunctions, 2024)

*Also appears in Her Body and Other Parties (2017)

=== Comics ===
- The Low, Low Woods #1-6 (DC Comics, 2019–2020)
1. Bottomless (2019)
2. Heaven on Earth (2020)
3. The Fruiting Body (2020)
4. Einstein on the Beach (2020)
5. The Witch's Tale (2020)
6. Bells to Rest, Lambs to Slaughter (2020)

Collected hardcover edition published 2020

=== Poetry ===
- "Meat Eater No. 5" (The New Yorker, 2023)

=== Essays ===
- "Luxury Shopping from the Other Side of the Register" (The New Yorker, 2013)
- "The Afterlife of Pia Farrenkopf" (The New Yorker, 2014)
- "O Adjunct! My Adjunct!" (The New Yorker, 2015)
- "A Girl's Guide to Sexual Purity" (Los Angeles Review of Books, 2015)
- "The Moon Over the River Lethe" (Catapult, 2016)
- "The Morals of the Stories" (Tiny Donkey, 2016)
- "How I Should Have Known Trump Would Be Elected President" (HTMLGiant, 2016)
- "The Trash Heap Has Spoken" (Guernica, 2017)
- "Gaslit Nation" (Medium, 2017)
- "Unruly, Adjective" (Medium, 2018)
- "The Anxiety That Binds" (The New York Times, 2018)
- "Household Object: Taxidermied Alligator Head" (The Believer, 2018)
- "A Dear and Nothing Else" (March Sisters: On Life, Death, and Little Women, Library of America, 2019)
- "What Does Pride Mean Now?" (The New York Times, 2020)
- "An Inquiry" (Horse Girls: Recovering, Aspiring, and Devoted Riders Redefine the Iconic Bond, HarperCollins, 2021)
- "Both Ways" (It Came From the Closet: Queer Reflections on Horror, Feminist Press, 2022)
- "The Shot That Made Me Gay" (The Metrograph, Issue 1, 2024)

=== As Editor ===
- PEN America Best Debut Short Stories 2019 (Catapult, 2019)
- The Best American Science Fiction and Fantasy 2019 (Mariner Books, 2019)
- Carmilla by Joseph Sheridan Le Fanu (Lanternfish Press, 2019)
- BAX 2020: Best American Experimental Writing (Wesleyan University Press, 2020)
- Critical Hits: Writers Playing Video Games (Graywolf Press, 2023)
