= Daughter of Mother-of-Pearl =

2026 essay collection by Dr. Mandy-Suzanne Wong

- Publisher: Graywolf Press
- Publication date: February 17, 2026
- Pages: 176
- ISBN: 9781644453735

Daughter of Mother-of-Pearl is a 2026 essay collection by Dr. Mandy-Suzanne Wong, published by Graywolf Press.

== Critical reception ==
Publishers Weekly wrote: "Relentlessly empathetic, these essays reframe nonhuman beings as individuals worthy of respect. Readers will be moved." Kirkus Reviews called it "A passionate paean to life’s wonders."

4Columns liked the essay collection more to poetry "to pick up and put down and contemplate between its fragments" rather than read in one sitting.
