= In the Dream House =

2019 memoir by Carmen Maria Machado

- First edition cover
- Author: Carmen Maria Machado
- Audio read by: Carmen Maria Machado
- Cover artist: Alex Eckman-Lawn (art)
- Language: English
- Subject: Domestic violence
- Genre: Memoir
- Publisher: Graywolf Press
- Publication date: November 5, 2019
- Publication place: United States
- Media type: Print (hardcover)
- Pages: 264
- Awards: Bisexual Book Award (2019); Judy Grahn Award (2020); Lambda Literary Award (2020); Folio Prize (2021)
- ISBN: 9781644450031
- Website: carmenmariamachado.com/in-the-dream-house

In the Dream House is a memoir by Carmen Maria Machado. It was published on November 5, 2019 by Graywolf Press.

The book was awarded the 2019 Bisexual Book Award, 2020 Judy Grahn Award, 2020 Lambda Literary Award for Nonfiction, and 2021 Rathbones Folio Prize. It was also longlisted for the 2020 Andrew Carnegie Medal for Excellence in Nonfiction.

== Background ==
The book details Machado's emotionally, mentally, and physically abusive relationship with another woman while studying for her MFA at the Iowa Writers' Workshop in Iowa City, Iowa. It is predominantly a second-person narrative, with Machado referring to her victimized self as "you". Machado utilizes a different narrative trope for each chapter. The author never directly names her abuser and only refers to her as "the woman in the dream house".

== Plot summary ==
In the Dream House begins with Carmen Maria Machado's living situation in Iowa City prior to her meeting the Dream House woman. Carmen shares a small two-bedroom apartment with her roommates John and Laura.

In the first chapter, Machado reflects on her childhood years and tells a story about her time in grade school. Machado then elaborates on experiences in her childhood and environment while growing up. She goes on to discuss instances with her previous lovers, leading up to meeting and falling in love with "the woman in the dream house" who domestically abused her. We see little hints of the abuse to come, but it is all overshadowed by their blossoming relationship. In chapter 2, red flags ramp up with Machado often being accused of not caring about her girlfriend and accounts of the verbal and psychological abuse Machado was subjected to. We also see more essay-like segments that examine historical context for domestic violence, especially in WLW (women loving women) relationships. In chapter 3, Machado tries to justify the abuse she is suffering as her and the woman in the dream house fall into a cycle of screaming fits that often include the woman in the dream house throwing things at Machado. In chapter 4, the woman in the dream house leaves Machado for another woman but soon after, the two sleep together for the final time and Machado considers rekindling their relationship. Luckily,she is pulled out of this way of thinking and instead healthily begins to grieve the relationship. In the last chapter, Machado is now removed completely from the relationship and begins dating her ex girlfriend’s ex girlfriend, whom she later marries. The book ends with Machado becoming the woman she is now, no longer confined to what the woman in the dream house wanted her to be.

== Main characters ==
Carmen Maria Machado: Machado is the person the text is centered on. The book is told from her perspective as she recounts her memories of her relationship.

The "woman in the dream house": This woman is Machado’s ex-girlfriend in the book. Throughout the work, the woman in the dream house abuses Machado; however, she is never directly named.

Val Howlett: Both Carmen Maria Machado and Val Howlett dated the woman who provoked the memoir In The Dream House. At first, the woman dated both Machado and Howlett. Eventually, the woman broke up with Howlett to pursue a monogamous relationship with Machado. After Machado and the "woman in the dream house" broke up, Machado got in touch with Howlett and the two later got married in 2017.

== Reception ==
=== Reviews ===
Kirkus Reviews gave the book a rave review, calling it a "fiercely honest, imaginatively written, and necessary memoir from one of our great young writers." Similarly, Publishers Weekly gave the book a starred review, calling it "an affecting, chilling memoir about domestic abuse." Parul Sehgal of The New York Times also praised the book, writing, "There is something anxious, and very intriguing, in the degree of experimentation in this memoir, in its elaborately titivated sentences, its thicket of citations."

=== Awards and honors ===
Booklist included In the Dream House on their list of the best adult books of 2019.

Awards for In the Dream House
Year	Award	Category	Result	Ref.
2019	Bisexual Book Award	Biography and Memoir	Won	
2019	Goodreads Choice Award	Memoir & Autobiography	Nominated—12th	
2020	ALA Over the Rainbow Book List	—	Top 10	
2020	Andrew Carnegie Medal for Excellence	Nonfiction	Longlisted	
2020	BookTube Prize	Nonfiction	Finalist	
2020	Goldie Award	General Non-Fiction	Won	
2020	Heartland Booksellers Award	Nonfiction	Shortlisted	
2020	Lambda Literary Award	Nonfiction	Won	
2020	Publishing Triangle Awards	Judy Grahn Award	Won	
2020	Reading Women Award	Nonfiction	Shortlisted	
2020	Stonewall Book Award	Israel Fishman Non-Fiction Award	Honor	
2020	William Saroyan International Prize for Writing	Nonfiction	Shortlisted	
2021	PEN/John Kenneth Galbraith Award for Nonfiction	—	Longlisted	
2021	Rathbones Folio Prize/The Writers' Prize	—	Won	
