= On Immunity =

2014 book by Eula Biss

On Immunity; An Inoculation
- Author: Eula Biss
- Language: English
- Genre: Nonfiction
- Publisher: Graywolf Press
- Publication date: 2014
- Publication place: United States
- Media type: Print (Paperback)
- Pages: 224
- ISBN: 978-1555977207

On Immunity: An Inoculation is a nonfiction book by Eula Biss published by Graywolf Press in 2014. It is primarily about vaccination of children. Bill Gates endorsed it on Twitter, saying "On Immunity is a great book that is not out to demonize anyone who holds opposing views." Literary Review described the book as "vital and passionate, at times maddening, always fascinating."

== Awards and honors ==
- 2014 New York Times Best Books of the Year, one of "10 Best Books".
- 2014 National Book Critics Circle Award (Criticism), finalist.
- 2015 Mark Zuckerberg book club selection February.
