= Paper Tigers and Minotaurs =

1993 economic history book

Paper Tigers and Minotaurs: The Politics of Venezuela's Economic Reforms
- Author: Moisés Naím
- Language: Spanish
- Publication date: 1993

Paper Tigers and Minotaurs: The Politics of Venezuela's Economic Reforms is a book published in 1993 by Moisés Naím about his experience within the cabinet of president Carlos Andrés Pérez between 1989 and 1990, as well as its explanation of the economic phenomena that occurred during this time and the approach that was made to them as part of a report by the Carnegie Endowment for International Peace about the Americas.

According to Naím, who was Minister of Trade and Industry, the book is "almost an autopsy (of the presidency)."

== Title and content ==
Regarding the title, he said in an interview in 2020 that the “paper tigers” were “the union forces, those of the private sector, civil society” who had “all kinds of resistance and rejection” to the "very profound structural reforms that change important beliefs and threads of life in society" that they tried to carry out when they were in government. On the other hand, "the minotaurs hidden were the military", to whom "no one in the government paid attention" nor did the rest of "the politicians, the intellectuals, the journalists, the businessmen", who, according to him, they assumed that they were "no longer political actors because Venezuela had already had an experience with military regimes", stating that there was a "huge oversight" in not noticing that a faction of the army was planning the attempts of coups d'état of 1992.
