= Tony Hoagland bibliography =

A list of the published works of Tony Hoagland, American poet.

== Poetry ==
Collections

- Turn Up the Ocean, Minneapolis, MN: Graywolf Press, ISBN 978-1-64445-092-5
- Priest Turned Therapist Treats Fear of God, Minneapolis, MN: Graywolf Press, ISBN 978-1-55597-807-5
- Recent Changes in the Vernacular, Espanola, NM: Tres Chicas Books, ISBN 978-1-89300-317-0
- Application for Release from the Dream, Minneapolis, MN: Graywolf Press, ISBN 978-1-55597-718-4
- Unincorporated Persons in the Late Honda Dynasty, St. Paul, MN: Graywolf Press, ISBN 978-1-55597-549-4
- What Narcissism Means to Me, St. Paul, MN: Graywolf Press, ISBN 978-1-55597-386-5
- Donkey Gospel, St. Paul, MN: Graywolf Press, ISBN 978-1-55597-268-4
- Sweet Ruin, Madison, WI: University of Wisconsin Press, ISBN 978-0-29913-584-3

Chapbooks and broadsides

- Into The Mystery, Cambridge, MA: Yellow Moon Press
- Don't Tell Anyone, Venice, CA: Hollyridge Press
- Little Oceans, Venice, CA: Hollyridge Press
- Hard Rain, Venice, CA: Hollyridge Press
- History of Desire, Tucson, AZ: Moon Pony Press
- Talking to Stay Warm, Minneapolis, MN: Coffee House Press
- A Change in Plans, Sierra Vista, CA: San Pedro Press

List of poems

Title	Year	First published	Reprinted/collected
Giving and getting	2015	Hoagland, Tony (July 20, 2015). "Giving and getting". The New Yorker. Vol. 91, no. 20. p. 57.	

== Literary criticism and essays ==
- The Art of Voice: Poetic Principles and Practice, (posthumous, with Kay Cosgrove). New York City, NY: W. W. Norton & Company ISBN 978-0-39335-791-2
- Twenty Poems That Could Save America and Other Essays, St. Paul, MN: Graywolf Press, ISBN 978-1-55597-694-1
- Real Sofistikashun: Essays on Poetry and Craft, St. Paul, MN: Graywolf Press, ISBN 978-1-55597-455-8
