= A Certain Hunger =

2020 novel by Chelsea Summers

- Author: Chelsea G. Summers
- Audio read by: Hillary Huber
- Language: English
- Publisher: Amazon Audible Originals, The Unnamed Press
- Publication date: December 1, 2020
- Pages: 240
- ISBN: 978-1-951213-14-5

A Certain Hunger is a debut novel by writer Chelsea G. Summers. It tells the story of serial killer Dorothy Daniels, a successful food writer who also eats men. Published in print by Unnamed Press on December 1, 2020, A Certain Hunger was widely praised, drawing comparisons to Raymond Chandler and Bret Easton Ellis.

== Publication history ==
Summers began writing the novel in 2011, spurred by heartbreak as well as a desire to move away from the first-person non-fiction she had previously been writing; it ultimately took her six years to finish the book. A Certain Hunger was first published as an audiobook on the Amazon Audible Originals label in the fall of 2019. On December 1, 2020, Unnamed Press published the first print edition.

== Plot ==
The book follows food writer Dorothy Daniels, who is also a convicted serial killer. Daniels narrates the story of her crimes from prison, moving back and forth in time between her life behind bars and the life that led to her imprisonment: specifically the food she ate, including eating men.

== Themes ==
In The New York Times, Amy Silverberg noted the feminist argument conveyed by the murderous protagonist: "Why is it that women have been kept out of so many industries, including Patrick Bateman-style serial murders? Because, Dorothy thinks, people don't want to believe women can do the job. ‘Feminism comes to all things,’ she says, ‘but it comes to recognizing homicidal rage the slowest.’" Writing in The New Republic, Josephine Livingston also emphasized this dimension of the novel, saying it complicates "‘ironic misandry’ schtick" and transforms it "into something complicated and engaging." Instead of a conventional "rape-revenge plot, [the] precision and passion Dorothy bring to murder have a stronger relation to her obsession with food: She has an intense sexual relationship with a kosher butcher, for example."

Silverberg notes too that A Certain Hunger is "also a history of the internet, and how it has democratized writing and ‘steamrolled the playing field’ of criticism broadly."

== Style ==
In The New Republic, Livingston compares Summers’s epicurean sensibilities with Patrick Süskind's writing in his novel Perfume, likewise "the story of a lone-wolf killer gifted with an extraordinary sensory palate, which eggs him on to violent frenzy." Suskïnd's protagonist Grenouille detects smells with an intensity and attention to detail akin to the way Daniels "experiences flavor [...] and in both books the collective weight of sensory images slowly creates something like an ethic of murder, posing violence as a creative act with an inevitable relationship to other forms of art—murder as a tribute to beauty."

In The New York Times, Silverberg noted the book's noir style, saying, "A Certain Hunger has the voice of a hard-boiled detective novel, as if metaphor-happy Raymond Chandler handed the reins over to the sexed-up femme fatale and really let her fly."

At the same time, critics noted the novel's comedic tone: Vanity Fair called it a "satire of a particular brand of foodieism." In the Los Angeles Times, Bethanne Patrick says Summers's “obviously ironic blitheness in fact calls back to Sondheim and Swift."

== Reception ==
A Certain Hunger received a starred review in Publishers Weekly, which described the novel as "fiendishly entertaining" and praised Summer's "shocking and darkly funny novel" as a "feminist-horror version of American Psycho." Writing for Times, Silverberg said, "With Summers's writing, I kept rereading sentences only as a double take, whispering to myself, ‘Man, this lady is screwed up’— which is, I'd argue, its own kind of pleasure." In The New Republic, Livingston called the book "a toothsome morsel" and "a swaggering, audacious debut, and a celebration of all the wet, hot pleasures of human contact."
