= Chelsea G. Summers =

American blogger and columnist

- Born: Janice Ellen Cable; November 6, 1962 (age 63); Illinois, U.S.
- Other name: chelsea girl
- Notable work: A Certain Hunger (2020)
- Website: www.chelseasummers.com

Janice Ellen Cable (born November 6, 1962), known professionally as Chelsea G. Summers, is an American blogger, columnist, author, and former stripper.

== Early life ==
Janice Ellen Cable was born on November 6, 1962 in Illinois. Her parents divorced when she was six months old and she was completely estranged from her father until 2007. Her father was a history professor at the University of North Carolina. Her mother was an English teacher and public relations director. She has a younger maternal half-sister.

Summers spent her early childhood in Illinois and, briefly, Burlington, Vermont. After her mother's remarriage she lived in a two-room schoolhouse in Huntington, Vermont, where her parents published The Vermont Freeman, an anti-Vietnam War journal.

== Career ==
In her early twenties, Summers very briefly worked as stripper for bachelor parties. In 1991 she began waitressing at Peter J. Stringfellow and El Morocco Present Thee DollHouse, a strip club in Manhattan. In 1992 she formally debuted as a stripper at Thee DollHouse under the name "Candace". She worked at various strip clubs throughout the next six years while attending college and graduate school.

In 2005, while writing her doctoral dissertation, Summers began the Typepad blog pretty dumb things under the alias "chelsea girl", a reference to the Manhattan neighborhood where she had lived since 1994. Her blog extensively covered her personal life, focusing especially on her sexual encounters, her romantic relationships, and her career as a stripper, which was serialized in a 42-part series entitled "spandex & lucite shoes".

In 2007, following the success of her blog, Summers left her Ph.D. program after nine years to pursue a career as a freelance writer. Previously she had been working at a boutique that sold clothes for dogs. She became a regular columnist for the blogs Fleshbot and Sappho's Girls. In 2015 she became the sex columnist for Adult magazine. Her writing has been published on websites and in magazines including Vulture, The Guardian, Vice, The New Republic, and Real Life.

Summers was working as a wine marketing writer in 2011 when her work required her to spend three months in Italy. While there, her friend suggested to her that she write her own Eat, Pray, Love. Instead, she began writing the book that would become her first novel A Certain Hunger (2020), which follows a cannibalistic food critic. Summers has credited her "rage at being middle aged and perimenopausal" and "the feeling of ageism in the writing industry" as inspirations for protagonist Dorothy Daniels's psychopathic rage. She has also cited Amber Tamblyn, Samantha Leigh Allen, Maria Adelmann, Angela Carter, and Matthew Gregory Lewis as literary influences. The book was released first as an audiobook by Audible Studios, before being published in print by Unnamed Press.

An Excellent Host (2024), Summers's second book, was a novella published for Indie Bookstore Day. A retelling of The Bacchae, the story focused on a ritualistic human sacrifice held after an unsuspecting man is invited over for an orgy.

== Personal life ==
Summers has lived in New York City since the 1980s. Summers splits her time between Manhattan and Stockholm.

== Bibliography ==
- A Certain Hunger (2020, Unnamed Press)
- An Excellent Host (2024, Unnamed Press)
