= Bethany C. Morrow =

American author

- Born: California, U.S.
- Education: University of California, Santa Cruz; University of Wales, Bangor
- Occupation: Writer
- Writing career
- Years active: 2018-present
- Genres: science fiction, fantasy, speculative fiction
- Notable works: Mem (2018); A Song Below Water (2020)
- Website: www.bethanycmorrow.com

Bethany C. Morrow is an American author. She writes speculative fiction for adult and young adult audiences. She is the author of Mem (2018), A Song Below Water (2020), and So Many Beginnings: A Little Women Remix (2021). She is also the editor of YA anthology Take the Mic (2019).

== Early life and education ==
Morrow was born and raised in California. She enjoyed writing and reading from childhood and names authors Christopher Pike and Lois Duncan, and the book Roll of Thunder, Hear My Cry as early favorites. She graduated from the University of California, Santa Cruz with a BA in sociology. She later attended University of Wales, Bangor for graduate school, studying clinical psychology, before leaving to pursue a career in publishing.

== Career ==
=== Mem (2018) ===
Morrow's first novel, Mem, was released in 2018. Set in Montreal in 1925, the science-fiction novel tells the story of an alternate reality where people's memories are extracted and replayed constantly by half-living creatures called Mems.

The book received positive critical reception and was described by Publishers Weekly as "ambitious and insightful, raising questions about memory, trauma, and humanity." Kirkus Reviews wrote, "With her dizzying concept, richly imagined narrator, ornate setting, and first-rate storytelling, Morrow offers an epiphany for readers of speculative fiction with echoes of ideas explored in films like Blade Runner and Eternal Sunshine of the Spotless Mind." The book was recommended by the Chicago Review of Books, The Washington Post, Los Angeles Times, and BuzzFeed News.

=== Take the Mic: Fictional Stories of Everyday Resistance (2019) ===
Her first book for young adults, Take the Mic: Fictional Stories of Everyday Resistance, was published in 2019 by Scholastic. It is an edited anthology that "aims to provide marginalized teens visibility and validation in stories of “everyday resistance.”"

Wesley Jacques of The Bulletin of the Center for Children's Books described Take the Mic in a review: "...too many of the stories are didactic and wrenchingly contrived, losing the plot and characters to hammer the message. Still, the sheer variety in this collection’s earnest depiction of bravery in the face of painful adversity is inspiring, making for an admirably contemporary addition to many libraries and at-home bookshelves."

=== A Song Below Water (2020) ===
Morrow released her debut YA novel A Song Below Water in June 2020. The book centers on an African-American high school student and siren named Tavia who attempts to her keep her identity a secret while living in Portland where magical creatures are oppressed.

Kirkus Reviews stated in their review, "Lengthy exposition with confusing plot turns and a reveal of ethnically diverse magical beings and their powers slows the first part of the book. The action picks up toward the middle, rising to create an exciting new contemporary fantasy." Fiona Hartley-Kroeger wrote in a review for The Bulletin of the Center for Children's Books, "Morrow skillfully balances acerbic social commentary and relatable teen angst with understated, heart-pounding tension...currents of racism and misogyny are palpable beneath a surface veneer of civility that threatens to erupt into violence at any moment."

=== So Many Beginnings: Little Women Remix (2021) ===
So Many Beginnings is a retelling of Little Women centered on four Black sisters during the Civil War.

Booklist stated about the book: "Morrow evokes the essence of the classic while offering a vivid picture of life during and after the Civil War for the newly emancipated." Fellow author Tracy Deonn also praised the book: "Bethany C. Morrow's prose is a sharpened blade in a practiced hand, cutting to the core of our nation's history. ... A devastatingly precise reimagining and a joyful celebration of sisterhood. A narrative about four young women who unreservedly deserve the world, and a balm for wounds to Black lives and liberty."

=== A Chorus Rises (2021) ===
A Song Below Water was followed by a sequel in 2022, A Chorus Rises, which focused on another student, Naema, who is an eloko and her struggles with her identity and fame.

AudioFile stated in a positive review, "Narrator Eboni Flowers creates the perfect voice for the charismatic Naema in this thoughtful story meshing magic and media." Alex Brown on Tor.com said "...a book that begs to be discussed loudly and passionately. All I want to do is get together with a group of Black friends and talk about every single paragraph, to parse the metaphors and truths, to relate the girls’ experiences to our own."

=== Cherish Farrah (2022) ===
Also in 2022, Morrow released Cherish Farrah published by Bantam Doubleday Dell, which returns to adult fiction and is listed as "social horror." Farrah is a seventeen-year old African-American girl who is obsessed with control and is best friends with the only other African-American girl in town, Cherish, who was adopted by rich, white parents. When Farrah's family loses their house, she decided to live with Cherish, but not all is as it seems in the rich household.

Archuleta Chisholm of Black Girl Nerds reviewed the book: "This is the kind of book that is supposed to disturb readers and make us think, and Morrow achieved both of these goals." Zan Romanoff of Los Angeles Times stated: "...the book’s last scenes leave the reader with the feeling that they’ve just been through the wringer regardless. Cherish Farrah is not a book for the faint of heart."

== Personal life ==
Morrow has lived in Great Britain and Montreal, Canada before returning to the United States to live in New York City.

== Bibliography ==
=== Novels ===
- Mem. 2018. Unnamed Press. ISBN 9781944700867
- A Song Below Water. 2020. Tor. ISBN 9781250315311
- So Many Beginnings: A Little Women Remix. 2021. Feiwel Friends. ISBN 9781250761217
- A Chorus Rises. 2021. TOR Teen. ISBN 1250316030
- Cherish Farrah: A Novel. 2022. Bantam Doubleday Dell. ISBN 0-593-18538-2

=== Anthology (as editor) ===
- Take The Mic: Fictional Stories of Everyday Resistance. Editor. 2019. Scholastic. ISBN 9781338343724

=== Essays ===
- "Why We Need Real Black Characters By Real Black Artists",The Establishment (October 25, 2016)
- "Why I Stan Planet of the Apes, and You Should Too", Tor.com (February 12, 2020)
- "The Revolution Will Be Dramatized", Tor.com (February 26, 2020)
- "Neverending Stories, Or: My 3 Favorite Books I’ve Never Actually Finished", Tor.com (May 27, 2020)

== Accolades ==
- 2020 – Winner, International Literacy Association Social Justice Book Award (for Take the Mic)
- 2021 – Nominee, Ignyte Award for Best YA Novel (for A Song Below Water)
- 2021 – Nominee, Locus Award for Best Young Adult Book (for A Song Below Water)
- 2022 – USA Today's 100 Black novelists and fiction writers you should read
