= Ethan Peck =

American actor (born 1986)

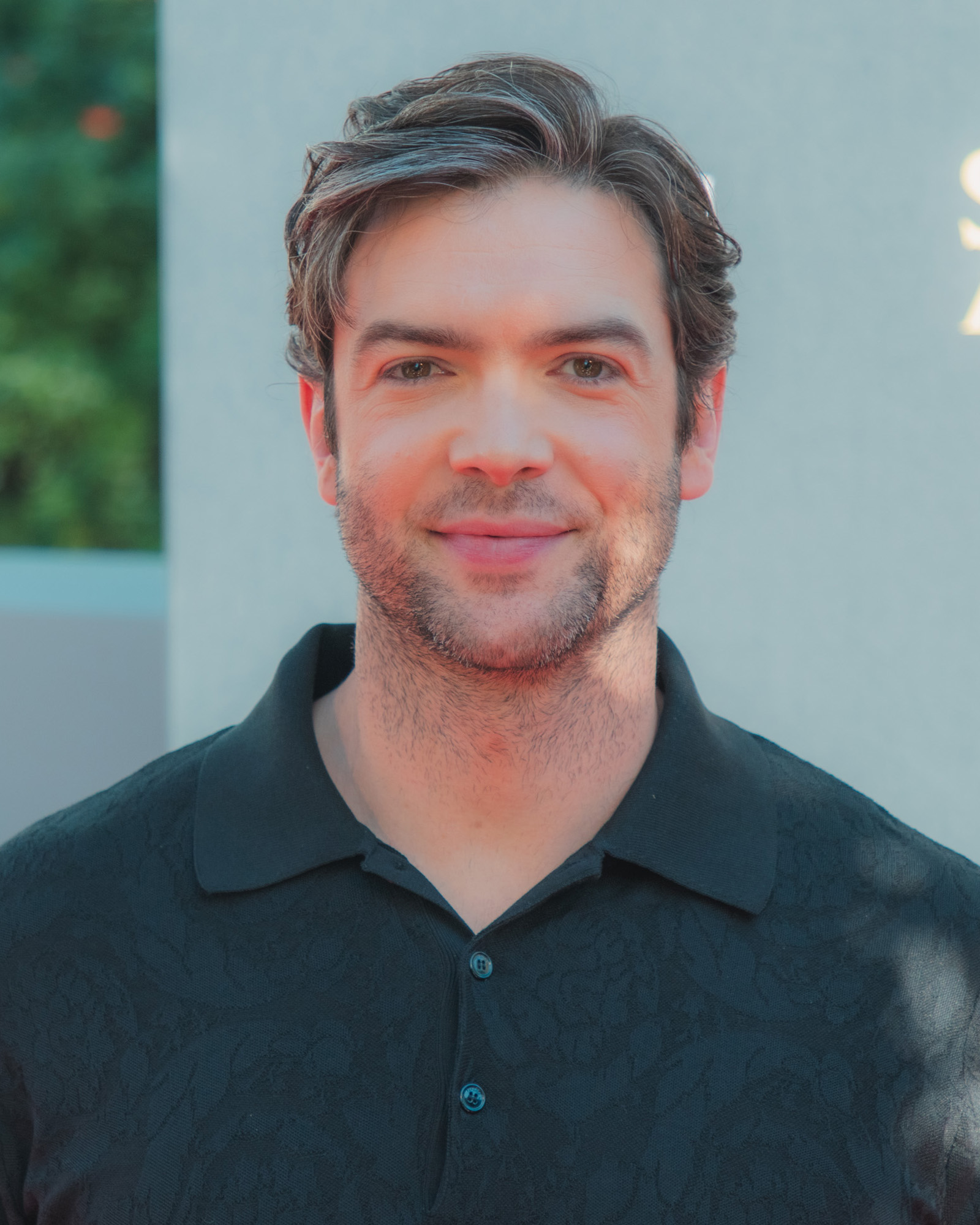
- Peck in 2026
- Born: Ethan Gregory Peck; March 2, 1986 (age 40); Los Angeles, California, U.S.
- Education: New York University
- Occupation: Actor
- Years active: 1995–present
- Relatives: Marisa Matarazzo (half-sister); Gregory Peck (paternal grandfather); Veronique Peck (step-grandmother); Cecilia Peck (paternal aunt)

Ethan Gregory Peck (born March 2, 1986) is an American actor, appearing in film and television roles since the late 1990s. He had a main ensemble role as Patrick Verona in the television series 10 Things I Hate About You, and has played Spock in four Star Trek series: Star Trek: Discovery, Star Trek: Short Treks, Star Trek: Strange New Worlds, and Star Trek: Very Short Treks. He is the grandson of actor Gregory Peck and Greta Kukkonen.

== Career ==
Peck had many television appearances as a young actor, including a younger Michael Kelso (played by Ashton Kutcher) in That '70s Show. In his first film role at age 9, he co-starred in the made-for-TV film Marshal Law as the son of Jimmy Smits' character. He later appeared in the 1999 movie Passport to Paris starring Mary-Kate Olsen and Ashley Olsen.

Peck co-starred with Adam Rothenberg and Mariah Carey in the 2008 film Tennessee, followed by a co-starring role opposite Peter Coyote and Bebe Neuwirth in the film Adopt a Sailor. He won the award for "Best Actor" at the 2009 Sonoma International Film Festival for his portrayal of "Sailor".

From 2009 to 2010, he starred on the television series 10 Things I Hate About You on ABC Family.

In 2012, Peck played Prince Maxon for the pilot adaptation of the book The Selection, but was later replaced by newcomer Michael Malarkey. Neither the first nor second pilot was picked up to go to series.

In 2015, Peck became a spokesperson for fashion brand Salvatore Ferragamo and appeared in a number of print editorials representing the Italian brand. He was also featured in Coming Home to Hollywood, a short film about the brand's 100th anniversary.

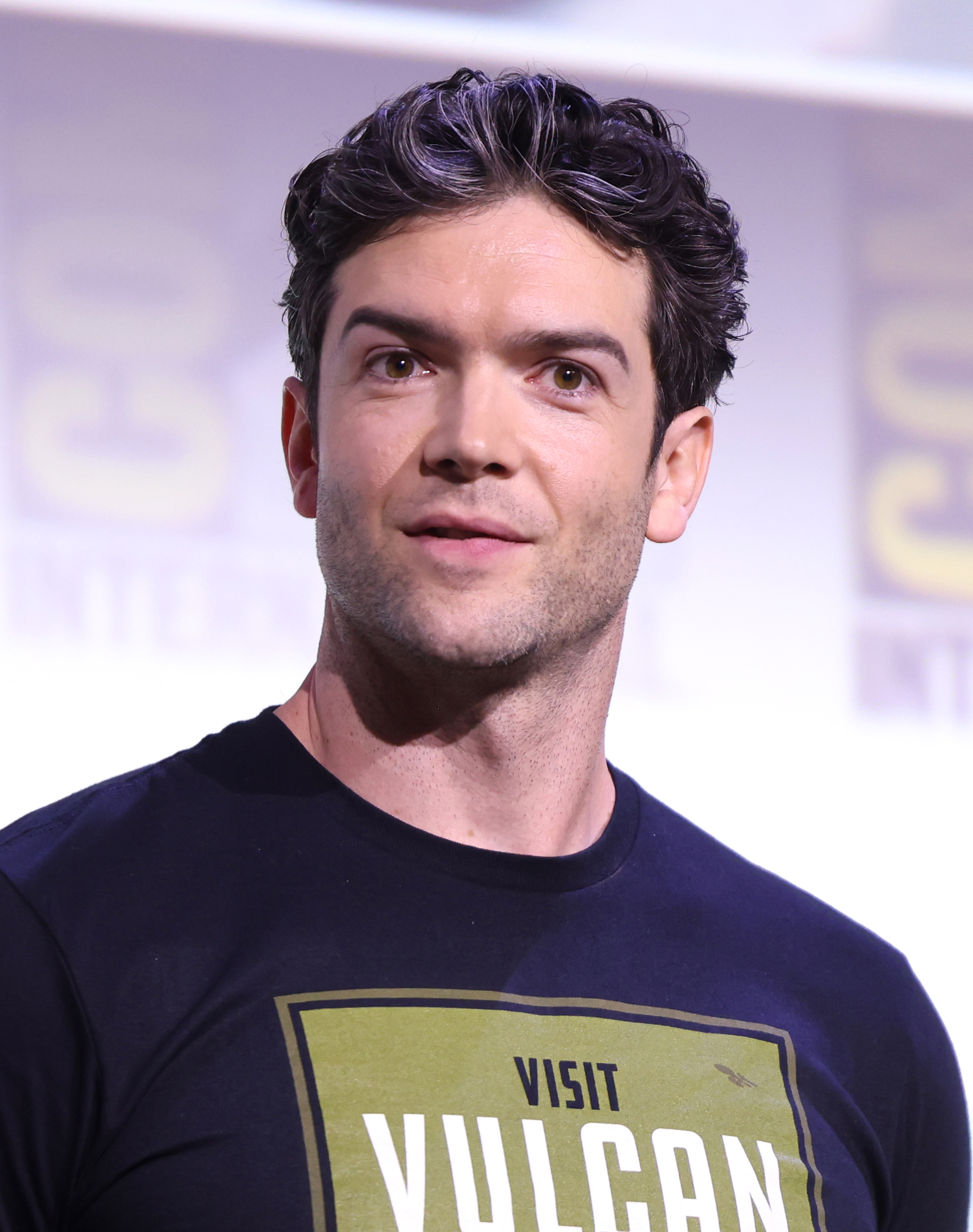
Peck in 2025

In 2016, Peck starred in The Curse of Sleeping Beauty and Tell Me How I Die.

Peck was cast in the 2018 comedy film The Honor List, alongside Meghan Rienks, Sasha Pieterse, Arden Cho and Karrueche Tran.

Peck portrayed Spock in the 2019 second season of Star Trek: Discovery. He continued the role in the spin-off series Star Trek: Strange New Worlds.

== Personal life ==
Born and raised in Los Angeles, Peck is the son of Stephen Peck — a former actor, documentary filmmaker, and Vietnam war veteran who was the former president and CEO of U.S. Veterans Initiative. His mother is abstract artist Francine Matarazzo. He is the grandson of actor Gregory Peck and his first wife, Finnish-born Greta Kukkonen. Peck attended private schools Campbell Hall and Harvard-Westlake in Studio City. He excelled in athletics and learned to play classical cello.

He has a half-sister from his mother's second marriage, Marisa Matarazzo, who is a novelist and creative writing professor at Otis College of Art and Design in Los Angeles.

After high school, Peck attended the Tisch School of the Arts at New York University, where he participated in the Experimental Theater Wing for three years before leaving to pursue his acting career.

== Filmography ==
=== Film ===
Year	Title	Role	Notes	Reference(s)
1999	Passport to Paris	Michel		
1999	Pumpkin Hill	Joey	Short film	
2004	Em & Me	Vaughn Davenport		
2008	Tennessee	Ellis		
2008	Adopt a Sailor	Sailor		
2010	Twelve	Sean		
2010	The Sorcerer's Apprentice	Andre Dunlap		
2011	In Time	Constantin		
2012	Mine Games	Guy		
2013	The Wine of Summer	James		
2013	Nothing Left to Fear	Noah		
2015	Eden	Andreas		
2016	The Curse of Sleeping Beauty	Thomas Kaiser		
2016	Tell Me How I Die	Pascal		
2018	The Honor List	Dillon Walker		
2018	The Holiday Calendar	Ty Walker		
2020	The Midnight Sky	Augustine Lofthouse (young)		
2021	In Max We Trust	Max Bryson	Short film	
2024	The Unholy Trinity	Sam Scarborough		

=== Television ===
Year	Title	Role	Notes	Reference(s)
1995	Charlie Grace	Tyler	Episode: "One Simple Little Favor"	
1996	Marshal Law	Josh Coleman	Television film	
1999	The Drew Carey Show	Kid	Episode: "Drew and the Gang Law"	
2000, 2002	That '70s Show	Michael Kelso (young)	2 episodes	
2003	The O'Keefes	Wade	Episode: "Festival of Birth" (unaired)	
2009–2010	10 Things I Hate About You	Patrick Verona	20 episodes Main role	
2011	Gossip Girl	David O. Russell's assistant	2 episodes	
2014	Rescuing Madison	John Kelly	Television film	
2016–2017	Madam Secretary	Roman Tolliver	2 episodes	
2017	I Ship It	Nick/Saxon	6 episodes Web series	
2019	Star Trek: Discovery	Spock	9 episodes Recurring (season 2)	
2019–2023	The Ready Room	Himself	5 episodes	
2019	Star Trek: Short Treks	Spock	2 episodes	
2019	Tell Me a Story	NYPD Officer 2 Jones	Episode: "The Curse"	
2020	Penny Dreadful: City of Angels	Herman Ackermann	3 episodes Recurring	
2022–present	Star Trek: Strange New Worlds	Spock	40 episodes Main role	

=== Music videos ===
Year	Title	Artist(s)	Reference(s)
2009	"I Want You to Want Me" (10 Things I Hate About You version)	KSM	

=== Video games ===
Year	Title	Role	Notes	Reference(s)
2012	Halo 4	Gabriel Thorne	Voice and CG model	
2014	Lightning Returns: Final Fantasy XIII	Additional voices		
2026	Star Trek Online: Rediscovered	Spock	Voice	

=== Web series/Podcast ===
Year	Title	Role	Notes	Reference(s)
2020	MARVELS Podcast	Reed Richards	Voice	
2023	Star Trek: Very Short Treks	Spock	Voice, 2 episodes	

== Accolades ==
Year	Award	Category	Nominated work	Result	Reference(s)
2009	Sonoma Valley Film Festival	Best Actor	Adopt a Sailor	Won	
2009	TV Guide Awards	Favorite Ensemble; Shared with Lindsey Shaw, Meaghan Martin, Nicholas Braun, Dana Davis, Larry Miller, Chris Zylka, and Ally Maki	10 Things I Hate About You	Nominated	
2019	IGN Summer Movie Awards	Best TV Ensemble; Shared with Sonequa Martin-Green, Doug Jones, Anthony Rapp, Mary Wiseman, Wilson Cruz, Shazad Latif, Anson Mount, Michelle Yeoh, Rachael Ancheril, Hannah Cheesman, Emily Coutts, Patrick Kwok-Choon, Oyin Oladejo, Ronnie Rowe, and Sara Mitich	Star Trek: Discovery	Nominated	
2019	Saturn Awards	Best Supporting Actor in Streaming Presentation	Star Trek: Discovery	Nominated	
2022	Aladerri Awards	Best Actor	In Max We Trust	Won	
2022	Saturn Awards	Best Supporting Actor in a Streaming Series	Star Trek: Strange New Worlds	Nominated	
2024	Saturn Awards	Best Supporting Actor in a Television Series	Star Trek: Strange New Worlds	Nominated	
2026	Saturn Awards	Best Supporting Actor in a Television Series	Star Trek: Strange New Worlds	Nominated	
