= Rational Ritual =

2001 book by Michael Chwe

Rational Ritual: Culture, Coordination, and Common Knowledge
- Author: Michael Suk-Young Chwe
- Language: English
- Published: United States
- Publisher: Princeton University Press
- Publication date: 2001
- Media type: Print
- Pages: 152
- ISBN: 0-691-00949-X (paper)
- Website: rationalritual.com

Rational Ritual: Culture, Coordination, and Common Knowledge is a 2001 non-fiction book by Michael Chwe, a professor at UCLA. Mark Zuckerberg, founder of Facebook, said the rational ritual in Chwe's book is an "important idea for designing social media" and included the book in his Mark Zuckerberg book club. As of 2017, there were 31 editions.

== Overview ==
Rational Ritual seeks to understand human rituals, including weddings, inaugurations, and political rallies, in terms of common knowledge generation. (Note: Common knowledge is a technical term introduced by the philosopher David Kellogg Lewis in 1969 and brought into game theory by Robert Aumann) In his review of Rational Ritual, Aviad Heifetz wrote, a "fact is common knowledge if everybody knows it" and "everybody knows that everybody knows it". Rational Ritual argues that one of the purposes of a ritual is to create common knowledge. (Note: The 2013 edition included a new afterword by the author.)

== Reviews ==
The book was reviewed in The New York Times, Economica, Journal of Economic Literature, Economic Journal, and the Journal of Artificial Societies and Social Simulation. In her 2002 review, Juliette Rouchier said the book was convincing in linking "rational individual behaviours (choosing the best action to attain a goal) with some that (like rituals) look prima facie irrational." She questioned Chwe's omissions in terms of omitting the "historical dimension" as an "important aspect of in the evolution of a social system." She also challenged his radical view on "submission" in which common knowledge is revealed through rituals whereby people come to think they were the only one with an idea or wish, and did not "dare perform an act" because they thought they were "on their own".

== Themes ==
Chwe wrote that popular television shows, for example are very efficient generators of common knowledge. He examined data on the prices of network television advertising slots, citing the example of the Super Bowl, whose advertisements (Note: A majority of Americans who own working televisions, 68% or 103,390,000 US viewers in 2018, watch the Super Bowl and it is one of the most watched annual sporting events in the world. By 2015 it hit a new record of $5 million for a 30 second spot.) for "coordination problem" goods, "had become the best common knowledge generator in the United States." Chwe used the example of how the airing of a domestic violence Super Bowl ad, not only put the issue on the "national agenda more publicly than ever before", but it led to a long-lasting myth spread by news reports following the game that the Super Bowl itself was a catalyst for domestic violence. The claim was that the game day was a "Day of Dread" for many women as domestic violence spiked on that day. In spite of being debunked since then, the myth continues to spread. (Note: Robert Markey posted his most famous performance artworks entitled "Super Bowl Scoreboard" in 1993, 1994 and 1996 in New York’s Grand Central Station. Based on available statistics at the time, Markey scoreboard tallied the incidents of domestic violence (which was then one woman every 15 seconds), beside Super Bowl football scores.)

== Awards and honors ==
- 2015 Mark Zuckerberg book club selection March.
