= Esmé Weijun Wang =

American writer

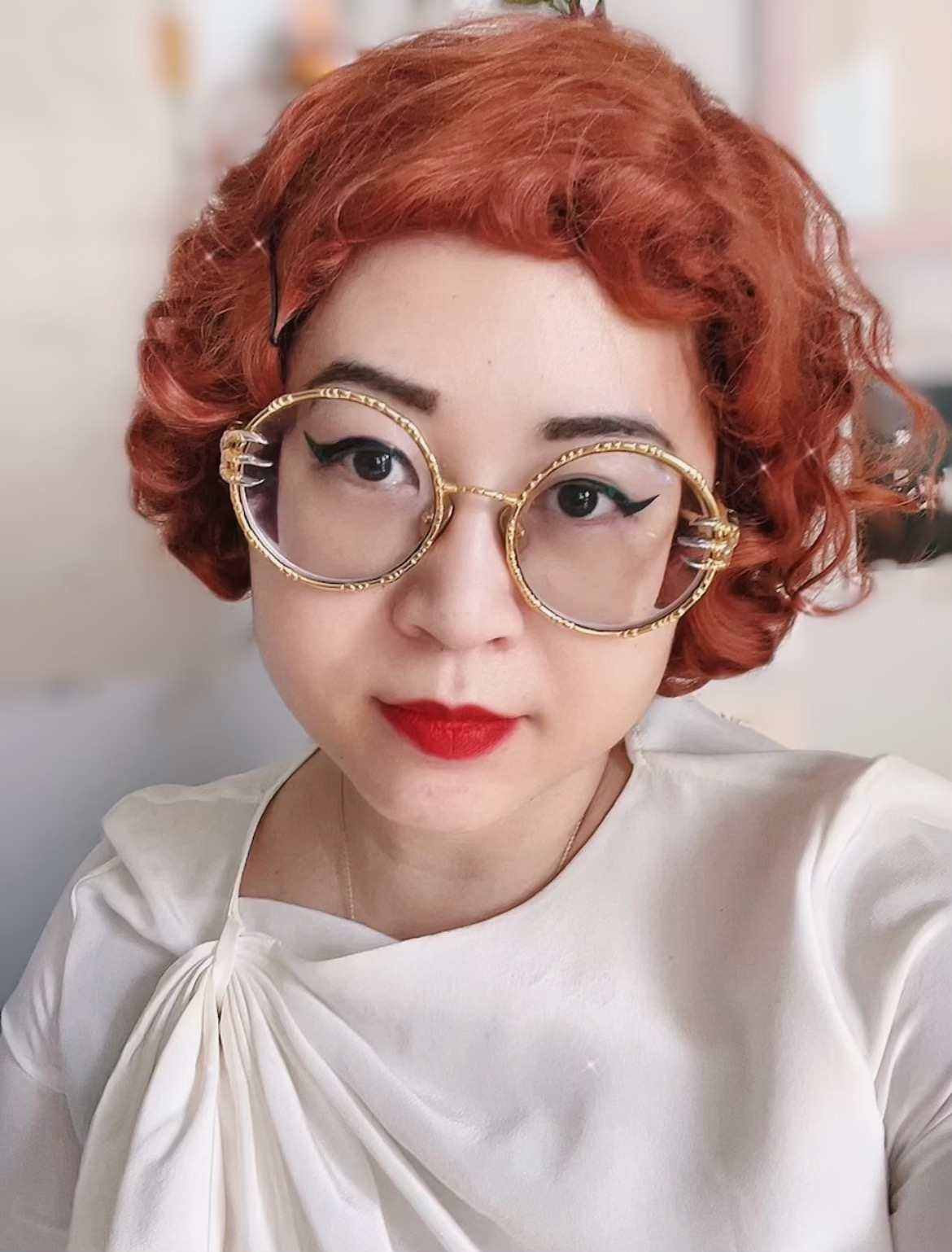
- Education: Yale University; Stanford University (BA); University of Michigan (MFA)
- Writing career
- Notable works: The Border of Paradise; The Collected Schizophrenias
- Notable awards: Whiting Award (2018)
- Website: esmewang.com

Esmé Weijun Wang is an American writer. She is the author of The Border of Paradise (2016) and The Collected Schizophrenias (2019). She is the recipient of a 2018 Whiting Award. In 2017, Granta Magazine named her to its decennial list of the Best of Young American Novelists.

== Early life and education ==
Wang was born to a Taiwanese American immigrant family in the Midwest. After high school, she initially attended Yale University as an undergraduate but transferred to Stanford University, where she graduated with a bachelor's degree in 2006. She then earned a Master of Fine Arts from the University of Michigan. Her master's thesis became the basis for a chapter in her first novel.

== Career ==
Wang's first book, a novel titled The Border of Paradise, was published by Unnamed Press in 2016. It is a gothic family drama about a family whose patriarch has committed suicide, leaving the mother to raise her two children alone. She "enacts her own version of tong yang xi — an old-fashioned Chinese tradition of families adopting poor girls so that they may be raised alongside their sons and eventually married to them" by encouraging her son and her step-daughter to become involved with each other. The Chicago Review of Books noted the careful handling of mental illness in each of the characters, concluding that "the novel raises interesting questions about child rearing, culture, and isolation".

In 2017 Wang was named a Best Young American Novelist by Granta, which creates the list once per decade. The following year Wang received a Whiting Award. Her short story, "What Terrible Thing It Was," published in Granta in 2017, appeared in the Best American Short Stories 2018 anthology.

In 2019 Wang's essay collection The Collected Schizophrenias was published by Graywolf Press. The essays focus on different life experiences during her struggles with schizoaffective disorder. The Collected Schizophrenias earned a starred review in Publishers Weekly before its release. Writing in the Los Angeles Review of Books, Katherine Coldiron later observed that the collection is "not a particularly juicy or grotesque book" and that it has "a sense of incompleteness," though she concluded that "the prose is so beautiful, and the recollection and description so vivid, that even if it were not mostly about an under-examined condition it would be easy to recommend. Esmé Weijun Wang is poised to become a major writer, and this is her origin story." Ilana Masad, writing for NPR, concluded that the book was "riveting, honest, and courageously allows for complexities in the reality of what living with illness is like". In The New York Times, Rachael Combe praised the writing but questioned the veracity of Wang's narration, noting that "images and insights Wang summons from these shards are sometimes frustrating, but often dazzling, and worth the reconstructive work". The Collected Schizophrenias made The New York Times Best Seller list for nonfiction shortly after its release.

In 2019, Wang signed a two-book deal with Riverhead for a new novel and a second essay collection.

== Personal life ==
In 2013 Wang experienced Cotard's Syndrome, an illness that makes people believe that they have already died. She lives in San Francisco.

== Recognition ==
- 2016: Graywolf Nonfiction Prize
- 2017: Granta Best of Young American Novelists
- 2018: Whiting Award
- 2020: 39th Northern California Book Awards: Creative Nonfiction
- 2020: Advocates Award

== Bibliography ==
=== Novels ===
- The Border of Paradise (Unnamed Press, 2016) ISBN 9781939419699

=== Nonfiction ===
- The Collected Schizophrenias (Graywolf Press, 2019) ISBN 9781555978273
