= The End of Power =

- First edition
- Author: Moisés Naím
- Language: English
- Subject: Economics, politics
- Genre: Non-fiction
- Publisher: Basic Books
- Publication date: March 13, 2013
- Publication place: United States
- Media type: Print
- Pages: 306 pp.
- ISBN: 978-0465037810

The End of Power: From Boardrooms to Battlefields and Churches to States, Why Being in Charge Isn't What It Used to Be, written by Moisés Naím, discusses the decline of power in established leaders and institutions.

== Summary ==
The book's overall theme points out while it is becoming easier to get power, it is also becoming harder to use it to control others and harder to keep it once you have it.

Naim suggests that globalization, economic growth, a growing global middle class, the spread of democracy, and rapidly expanding telecommunications technologies have changed our world. He says these developments have created a fluid and unpredictable environment which has unsettled the traditional dominions of power.

== Reception ==
On January 2, 2015, Mark Zuckerberg selected The End of Power as his inaugural pick for his "Year of Books" challenge for the Mark Zuckerberg book club, a public resolution to read one new book every two weeks in 2015. Washington Post wrote, “It’s not just that power shifts from one country to another, from one political party to another, from one business model to another, Naim argues; it’s this: 'Power is decaying.'” Forbes called the book the “ankle-biter economy.” The End of Power was also listed for the Financial Times and McKinsey Business Book of the Year.
