= Especially Heinous: 272 Views of Law & Order SVU =

Novella by Carmen Maria Machado, released 2013

- Short story by Carmen Maria Machado
- Country: United States
- Language: English
- Genres: Weird fiction, Horror

Publication
- Publisher: The American Reader
- Publication date: May 2013

Especially Heinous: 272 Views of Law & Order SVU is a 2013 weird fiction novella by American writer Carmen Maria Machado. The story is told in the form of 272 capsule synopses from the first 12 seasons of the police procedural, Law & Order: Special Victims Unit. It was first published in The American Reader, in May 2013, and republished in Machado's 2017 short story collection Her Body and Other Parties.

== Synopsis ==
As Elliot Stabler and Olivia Benson investigate standard cases of horrific depravity and cruelty, they gradually find themselves enmeshed in a mysterious situation involving alien abductions, ghosts with bells for eyes, and—perhaps most disturbingly—the appearance of Abler and Henson, two doppelgängers who are living Stabler and Benson's lives better than Stabler and Benson are.

== Reception ==
The Huffington Post included the novella on a list of "the 10 Best Short Stories You've Never Read", describing it as "funny, disturbing, canny, and inventive" as well as "engaging, strange, and wholly original." Writing for NPR, K. Tempest Bradford compared it to "Lovecraft meets Dick Wolf", stating that it is her "favorite" of Machado's work, while Strange Horizons called it a "highlight of the year".

At the Los Angeles Review of Books, Sofia Samatar judged it to be "one of Machado's most powerful and disturbing works", and noted it as an example of how Machado uses stylistic forms other than those of narrative. The Guardian felt it was a "baggy monster" and a "bizarre phantasmagoria" which "satirises the tendency of long-running narratives to become increasingly baroque".

== Background ==
Machado has explained the story's genesis as the result of having had episodes of Law and Order: SVU playing continuously on Netflix while she suffered from a fever for three days in 2009.
