= Notes from No Man's Land =

2009 book of essays by Eula Biss

- Author: Eula Biss
- Publisher: Graywolf Press
- Publication date: February 3, 2009
- Pages: 230
- ISBN: 9781555975180

Notes From No Man's Land is a 2009 book of essays by Eula Biss. The book won the 2008 Graywolf Press Nonfiction Prize and the National Book Critics Circle Award for Criticism.

The book deals with issues of race in America, and in particular, Biss often explores what it means to be a white woman in predominantly black spaces, the issue of white privilege, and the inherited, deeply ingrained racism of American culture. The first essay in the collection, "Time and Distance Overcome" juxtaposes the history of telephone poles and the history of lynching into an exploration of American history. Another essay, "Goodbye to All That", is a retelling of and response to Joan Didion's essay of the same name, which reflects on Biss's experiences living in New York City.

== Contents ==
- Time and Distance Overcome
- Relations
- Three Songs of Salvage
- Land Mines
- Goodbye to All That
- Black News
- Letter to Mexico
- Babylon
- Back to Buxton
- Is This Kansas
- No Man's Land
- Nobody Knows Your Name
- All Apologies
