= James Boice (writer) =

American fiction writer (born 1982)

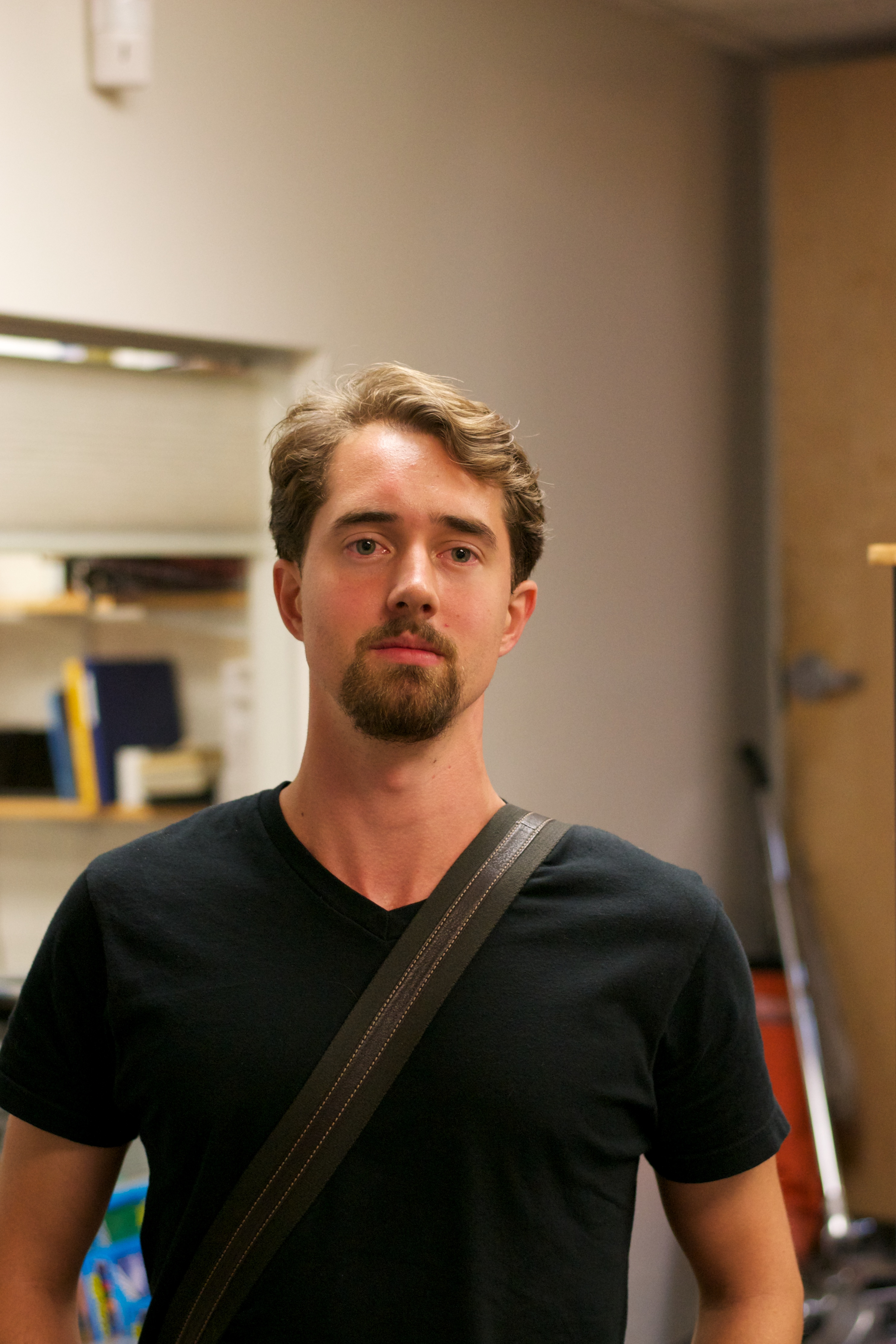
- Born: 1982 (age 43–44); Salinas, California, U.S.
- Writing career
- Genre: Fiction

James Boice (born 1982) is an American fiction writer.

== Early life ==
He was born in Salinas, California, and raised in Northern Virginia. He dropped out of college after three weeks to be a writer.

== Career ==
Boice's work has appeared in Fiction, McSweeney's, Salt Hill, and Like Water Burning. He has contributed to Esquire.

He is the author of MVP, published by Scribner in 2007, the prologue of which debuted in Esquire in September 2006.

His second novel, NoVA, was published by Scribner in 2008. Kirkus Reviews wrote "As bleak as this novel may be, there are savagely funny episodes concerning random sex and one surrealistic orgy of serial vomiting. Yet the writing lacks a coherent narrative voice... The narrative is powerful and the characters compelling, when the writing doesn’t undermine the novelist’s considerable promise."

His third novel, The Good and the Ghastly, also published by Scribner, was released in 2011. Kirkus Reviews wrote: "A thousand years after the apocalypse or Armageddon or something, Visa Second America finds history repeating itself through an attempt to recast civilization from its ashes. The third and most audacious novel by Boice is futuristic without being science fiction or even speculative fiction...Stop this world, you’ll want to get off."

His fourth novel, The Shooting, was published by Unnamed Press in September 2016.

Boice's fifth novel, Who Killed the Fonz?, was published by Simon & Schuster in February 2019.

== Personal life ==
Boice lives near Boston, Massachusetts.

== Bibliography ==
=== Novels ===
- MVP (2007)
- NoVA (2008)
- The Good and the Ghastly (2011)
- The Shooting (2016)
- Who Killed the Fonz? (2019)
