= Fariha Róisín =

Australian-Canadian writer (born 1990)

- Born: 10 January 1990 (age 36); Waterloo, Ontario, Canada
- Occupations: Writer, poet, cultural critic
- Writing career
- Language: English
- Years active: 2010–present
- Genres: Literary fiction, poetry
- Subjects: Self-care, personal essay, pop culture
- Notable work: How to Cure a Ghost
- Website: fariharoisin.com

Fariha Róisín (born 10 January 1990) is a Canadian-Australian writer. They released their debut poetry collection How to Cure a Ghost in 2019 and their debut novel Like a Bird in 2020. Their first work of non-fiction, Who is Wellness For: An Examination of Wellness Culture and Who it Leaves Behind, was released in 2023.

== Early life ==
Róisín was raised by Muslim Bangladeshi immigrant parents in Sydney, Australia. Their father is a lecturer and their mother is an artist. Róisín's maternal grandfather was Mohammad Abdul Haque, a socialist former Member of Parliament in Bangladesh.

Róisín moved to the United States at age 19 to study law at university, but dropped out to pursue a writing career.

== Career ==
Róisín has been a freelance writer since 2010 and has written for publications including IndieWire, HuffPost, Filmmaker, The New York Times, and Bon Appetit. They began their writing career in 2010 via an internship at the fashion blog StyleLikeU, and then participated in a program at the Critics Academy (run by IndieWire) to learn how to be a film critic. Many of their written pieces are film criticism, cultural criticism, or first-person personal essays. They frequently write about self-care, mental illness, spirituality, and socio-political issues. From 2012 to 2017 they co-hosted the pop culture analysis podcast Two Brown Girls with Zeba Blay. Róisín appeared in Jidenna's 2019 music video for the song "Sufi Woman".

Róisín debut poetry collection How to Cure a Ghost was published in 2019 by Abrams Image. They describe the collection as relating to "traumas [they've] experienced as a queer Muslim woman," and it explores topics including Islamophobia, sexual assault, and white supremacy. The collection was written over five years.

Róisín's first novel Like A Bird was published in 2020 by Unnamed Press.

== Personal life ==
Róisín is Muslim and queer. They have previously lived in Montreal and New York City, and currently reside in Los Angeles. They are a survivor of child sexual abuse. During adolescence they engaged in self-harm and experienced suicidal ideation, and attempted suicide at age 25.

== Works ==
- How to Cure a Ghost. Abrams Image. 2019. ISBN 978-1419737565
- Like a Bird. Unnamed Press. 2020. ISBN 9781951213091
- Who Is Wellness For?: An Examination of Wellness Culture and Who It Leaves Behind. HarperWave. 2022. ISBN 9780063077089
- Survival Takes a Wild Imagination. Andrews McMeel Publishing. 2023. ISBN 978-1-5248-7822-1
