= Alex Espinoza (writer) =

American writer

Alex Espinoza is an American writer and educator, living in Los Angeles. He has written the novels Still Water Saints (2007) and The Five Acts of Diego León (2013), as well as Cruising: An Intimate History of a Radical Pastime (2019).

== Life and work ==
Espinoza was born in Tijuana, Mexico and moved with his family to the United States at age two, growing up in suburban Los Angeles. He graduated from the University of California, Riverside, and earned an MFA from the University of California, Irvine's Program in Writing.

He teaches at the University of California, Riverside where he serves as the Tomás Rivera Endowed Chair of Creative Writing, and lives in Los Angeles.

== Publications ==
- Still Water Saints, published in Spanish as "Los Santos de Agua Mansa, California" (Random House, 2007)
- The Five Acts of Diego León (Random House, 2013)
- Cruising: An Intimate History of a Radical Pastime (Unnamed, 2019)
- Sons of El Rey (Simon & Schuster, 2024) ISBN 9781668032787

== Awards ==
- 2014: American Book Award from the Before Columbus Foundation for The Five Acts of Diego León
- 2014: Fellowship in Prose from the National Endowment for the Arts
- 2019: MacDowell fellowship
