= The Collected Schizophrenias =

2019 essay collection by Esme Weijun Wang

- Author: Esmé Weijun Wang
- Language: English
- Genre: Essays
- Publisher: Graywolf Press
- Publication date: 2019
- Publication place: America
- Media type: Paperback
- Pages: 224
- ISBN: 978-1-55597-827-3

The Collected Schizophrenias is a 2019 collection of essays by Esmé Weijun Wang. Published by Graywolf Press, it won the Graywolf Press Nonfiction Prize, as well as the Whiting Award for Nonfiction.

== Development ==
Wang is the author of the 2013 novel The Border of Paradise, a multi-generational family story of immigrants dealing with mental illness. Talking to The Paris Review, she spoke about using her experience with mental illness in her fiction: "I wrote The Border of Paradise with the intent of writing about psychosis, hallucinations, et cetera, in a very visceral way that I hadn’t seen before."

In an interview with The Guardian, Wang was asked what made her start writing the book. She responded, "I had never planned to write a nonfiction book – I have an MFA in fiction. I was waiting around to see if my first novel would ever sell and I was experiencing a severe episode of psychosis. As a way of coping, I was writing about it, which became the essay Perdition Days. After that episode was over, I polished the essay and ended up finding a home for it on the Toast website. It became rather popular and I received a lot of emails and kind comments. I began to write more essays. That snowballed into what is now this book."

She said that she was inspired by The Noonday Demon by Andrew Solomon, and listened to Ultraviolence by Lana Del Rey (she ended up including Del Rey in the book's acknowledgments).

== Content ==
- Diagnosis
- Toward a Pathology of the Possessed
- High-Functioning
- Yale Will Not Save You
- The Choice of Children
- On the Ward
- The Slender Man, the Nothing, and Me
- Reality, On-Screen
- John Doe, Psychosis
- Perdition Days (originally published in The Toast)
- L'Appel du Vide (a version was originally published in Hazlitt)
- Chimayo
- Beyond the Hedge

== Literary significance and reception ==
The Los Angeles Times wrote, "The essays are resoundingly intelligent, often unexpectedly funny, questioning, fearless and peerless, as Wang makes for brilliant company on 13 difficult walks through largely uncharted territory." The Los Angeles Review of Books was equally praising, "The Collected Schizophrenias is a necessary addition to a relatively small body of literature, but it’s also, quite simply, a pleasure to read. The prose is so beautiful, and the recollection and description so vivid, that even if it were not mostly about an under-examined condition it would be easy to recommend. Esmé Weijun Wang is poised to become a major writer, and this is her origin story."

A review in The New Yorker wrote, "I often thought about the toll that writing it must have taken on Wang, physically and mentally, and the bravery it took for her to do it."

Rachael Combe, writing in The New York Times, was more critical, "While the reader may not become more trusting of Wang’s perspective after reading these essays, she will certainly become more likely to challenge her own."
