= Bette Adriaanse =

Dutch writer and visual artist

Bette Adriaanse (born 1984, Amsterdam), also known as Bette A., is a Dutch writer and visual artist.

== Early life and education ==
Adriaanse was born in Amsterdam and grew up in Oudorp, in the Netherlands. She studied Image and Language at the Gerrit Rietveld Academie in Amsterdam and later completed a Master in Creative Writing at the University of Oxford.

== Career ==
Adriaanse's debut novel, Rus Like Everyone Else (2015), was published by US-based publisher Unnamed Press. It explores urban alienation and human connection through the eyes of a postal worker in a fictional neighborhood. It was translated into Dutch as Post voor Rus Ordelman (2016) and published by Uitgeverij Cossee. The novel received reviews in Structo magazine, where Adam Ley-Lange praised its nuanced portrayal of isolation and community, and The Gazette, where correspondent Laura Farmer described the novel as "beautiful, creative, whimsical and heartfelt".

Her second novel, What's Mine (published by Unnamed Press in 2023), written in Dutch and English (published as Wat Van Mij Is, by Uitgeverij Cossee in 2024), examines ownership and justice through a conflict over an apartment. Dutch newspaper Nederlands Dagblad highlighted its plot and thematic depth. Tzum magazine noted its layered narrative and filmic qualities.

In 2025, Adriaanse co-authored What Art Does: An Unfinished Theory with musician and artist Brian Eno. Published by Faber & Faber, the book examines the role of art in society and its impact on human experience. It discusses themes such as collective creativity, accessibility of artistic expression, and the relationship between art and emerging technologies. It received reviews from outlets including The Guardian, The Irish Times, Kirkus Reviews, and the Wall Street Journal.

In 2026, Adriaanse published the short story collection Slow Stories with Unnamed Press.Kirkus Reviews described the collection as "both timeless and prophetic". The collection consists of sixteen short stories developed over a period of two decades.

Two stories from the book, "The Endless House" and "The Other Village", were adapted into audio recordings featuring narration by Adriaanse with music by Brian Eno. The recordings were released as part of a limited-edition multimedia project called 2 Slow Stories, combining book, vinyl record, and visual art. Proceeds from the project were donated to charitable initiatives; The Heroines! Movement and EarthPercent.

Adriaanse has taught creative writing at the Gerrit Rietveld Academie. She is co-founder of the TRQSE Foundation, promoting collaborations between artists and scientists around social topics, and co-founder of the Heroines! movement, a global storytelling project focusing on women role models.. Together with Afghan poet Somaia Ramish she started Writing the Future, an online creative writing course for women in Afghanistan.

== Recognition ==
In 2020, Adriaanse was nominated for the Victoriefonds Cultuurprijs in the category Literature. She was included as one of 35 authors on the Generatie latte list compiled by Dutch magazine Vrij Nederland representing a new generation of Dutch and Flemish authors born after 1980.

== Bibliography ==
- Rus Like Everyone Else (2015)
- Post voor Rus Ordelman (2016) – Dutch version of Rus Like Everyone Else
- Wat van mij is (2023)
- What's Mine (2023)
- What Art Does: An Unfinished Theory (2025, co-authored with Brian Eno)
- Slow Stories (2026)
