= Group of Fifty =

- Company type: Nonprofit
- Industry: not-for-profit
- Founded: 1993
- Headquarters: Washington D.C.
- Key people: Moisés Naím
- Website: www.g50.org

The Group of Fifty (Spanish: Grupo de los Cincuenta, or G-50) is a non-profit, business organization based in Washington, D.C., USA, whose primary goal is to foster open dialogue among business leaders in Latin America to promote economic development and social progress in the region.

== History ==
The organization was first conceived in 1993 by Moisés Naím, a distinguished fellow at the Carnegie Endowment for International Peace, the oldest foreign-policy think tank in the United States. It was formally incorporated as a non-profit in 2009 and has been operating as an independent organization since 2008, with no partisan, ideological, religious, or commercial affiliations. Naím has served as founder and chairman since the organization's founding.

== Activities ==
The G50 is composed of a select group of executives who lead private business enterprises across the Americas. Members meet regularly to address changes as they appear in different sectors and markets, to hear from their peers in other countries about alternative business strategies, and to compare experiences and exchange ideas about the future of the hemisphere, its economies and its politics.

In 2011, the G50 launched a subgroup called the Millennium Leaders (ML50), composed of rising young business leaders and entrepreneurs under 40 years of age.
