= So Many Beginnings =

Young adult novel by Bethany C. Morrow

So Many Beginnings: A Little Women Remix
- Author: Bethany C. Morrow
- Language: English
- Series: Remixed Classics
- Release number: 2
- Genre: Young adult, historical fiction
- Set in: North Carolina, United States, 1863
- Publisher: Macmillan Publishers
- Publication date: 2020-09-07
- Publication place: United States
- Media type: Print
- ISBN: 9781250815507
- OCLC: 1277274390
- Preceded by: A Clash of Steel: A Treasure Island Remix
- Followed by: Travelers Along the Way: A Robin Hood Remix
- Website: us.macmillan.com/books/9781250815507

So Many Beginnings: A Little Women Remix is a historical fiction young adult novel by American writer Bethany C. Morrow. The book was published by Macmillan on September 7, 2021, and is Volume 2 of the Remixed Classics series.

== Plot ==
Shortly after Abraham Lincoln issued the Emancipation Proclamation, sisters Joanne, Bethlehem, Amethyst, and Margaret, and their mother live with other freedmen on a Roanoke Island colony, amid the backdrop of the Civil War.

== Background ==
Morrow was approached with the offer to write an adaptation of Louisa May Alcott's Little Women. She worked to craft a story unrelated to the original novel that would reflect the concerns of an African American family in 1863, and made the Civil War central to the plot. Morrow heavily referenced Patricia C. Click's Time Full of Trial to inform her rendering of the historical events of the time. She stated that the project represented her intention to "challenge the canon".

== Reception ==
So Many Beginnings received positive reception. In a starred review, Publishers Weekly said of the book, "a beloved story gains new meaning through the lens of enduring Black resilience, love, and hope." Norah Piehl of Booklist praised the book in a starred review: "Morrow's nuanced take on what life was like for newly freed Black people at this time will prompt readers to reconsider the simplistic good vs. evil, North vs. South mythologies that characterize too many Civil War narratives." In a less positive review, Rachelle Hampton of Slate wrote that "at times the book strains under the weight of educating, rather than entertaining" but also stated "that doesn't mean Morrow's version isn't without its own charms...She manages to make a familiar story entirely hers...their stories are their own and in some ways make Alcott's version more satisfying."
