= Marisa Matarazzo =

American writer, teacher

- Born: United States
- Occupation: Author; educator
- Education: Yale University (BA); University of California, Irvine (MFA)
- Relatives: Ethan Peck (half-brother)

Marisa Matarazzo is an American author and educator. She is best known for her collection of interconnected short stories, Drenched, published by Soft Skull Press, an imprint of Counterpoint.

== Biography ==
She is from Los Angeles, California, the daughter of abstract painter Francine Matarazzo, and John H. Schumann, a professor of applied linguistics. Her half-brother from her mother's first marriage to Gregory Peck's son Stephen Peck, is actor Ethan Peck.

She earned her BA degree from Yale University, where she received the Wallace Prize for fiction writing, and the Arthur Willis Colton Scholarship. Earning her MFA degree from University of California, Irvine, she was the recipient of the Dorothy and Donald Strauss Endowed Thesis Fellowship.

Matarazzo has been published in Ploughshares, The Believer, Faultline, and Hobart, among others, and she has taught at UCLA Extension Writers' Program. Her work has also been performed by WordTheatre.

She is an assistant professor in the MFA Writing Program at Otis College of Art and Design, Los Angeles, and is at work on a novel. She was a two-time recipient of the Elmore A. Willets Prize for fiction.

== Bibliography ==
- Drenched:Stories of Love and Other Deliriums (2010) ISBN 1593762712
- "Fontanel", Unstuck, Volume 1 (2011) ISBN 9780983975106
