= Other Electricities =

2005 novel by Ander Monson

- Author: Ander Monson
- Cover artist: Charles Casey Martin
- Language: English
- Genre: Literary fiction
- Publisher: Sarabande Books
- Publication date: 1 May 2005
- Publication place: United States
- Media type: Print (Paperback)
- Pages: 224
- ISBN: 978-1-932511-15-4 (First edition)

Other Electricities is a novel by Ander Monson. It is Monson's first novel, and is described by him as a work of poetry, fiction and nonfiction.

== Plot ==
Other Electricities is based on experiences Monson had as a child growing up on the Upper Peninsula of Michigan. The novel focuses on the characters and their interactions with one another in a small town in Upper Michigan. Much of the book revolves around the central character "Yr Protagonist" and his interactions with his friends and family. The opening chapter describes a police officer alerting the family of Liz, Yr's girlfriend, being killed in a snowmobile crash in a frozen river, which is the basis of much of the novel. Some reviewers speculate that Yr Protagonist is a semi-autobiographical character.

== Structure ==
Monson stated that he tried to "activate" otherwise non-authorial sections of the text by specially composing a character list, list of symbols, and index. The book's pieces of poetry were designed by Monson to be read as poetry or prose. The book's thematic material is based largely on repeating motifs.

== Role of Design ==
Monson, who claims "informal training" in design, both authored the text and designed the page layout of an early Other Electricities in PageMaker. In an early draft of the novel, headers and gutter space featured text that interacted with page numbers.

== Awards and nominations ==
Monson was a finalist for the 2006 New York Public Library's Young Lions Award, and won the 2007 John C. Zacharis First Book Award from the literary journal Ploughshares for Other Electricities.
