= Ander Monson =

American writer

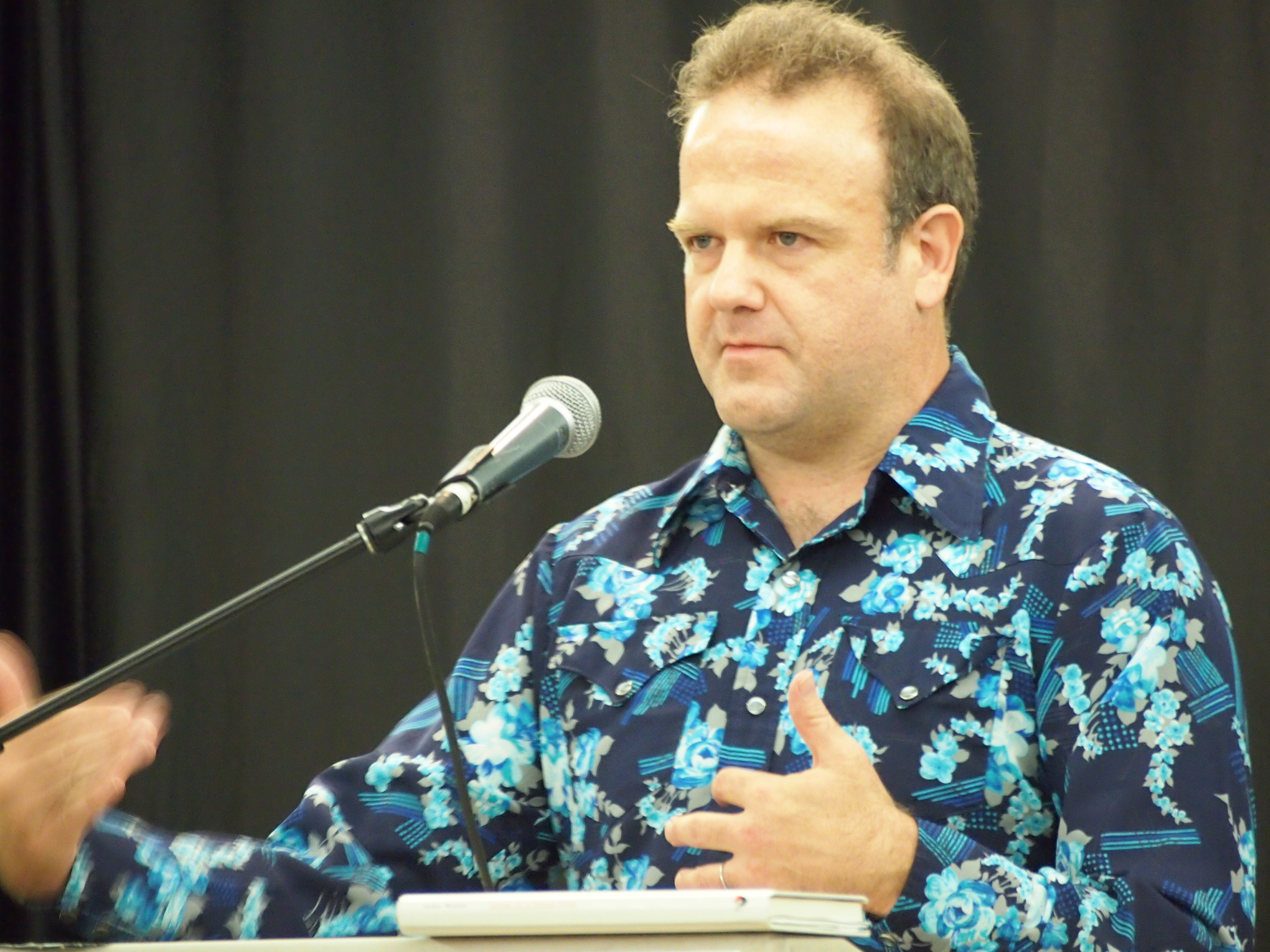
- Born: April 9, 1975 (age 51); Ann Arbor, Michigan, U.S.
- Education: Knox College (BA); Iowa State University (MA); University of Alabama (MFA)
- Writing career
- Genres: novel, poetry, nonfiction
- Notable awards: John C. Zacharis First Book Award, Great Lakes Colleges New Writers Award in Nonfiction,, Guggenheim Fellowship, Howard Foundation Fellowship

Ander Monson (born April 9, 1975) is an American novelist, poet, and nonfiction writer.

== Life ==
He was raised in Houghton, Michigan in the Upper Peninsula. His mother's death when he was seven years old is reflected in the themes of his later fiction. He received his Bachelor of Arts from Knox College in Galesburg, Illinois. He went on to earn an MA from Iowa State University and an MFA from the University of Alabama.

Monson's first two books, the novel Other Electricities and the poetry collection Vacationland, were published in 2005. Other Electricities was praised widely for its innovative approach, lyric intensity, and grim humor. His nonfiction debut, Neck Deep and Other Predicaments: Essays was published in February 2007. It was critically acclaimed for its imaginative reworkings of the form of the essay. In March 2010 Graywolf Press published his collection of essays titled "Vanishing Point: Not a Memoir." The collection includes his essay "Solipsism" which was originally published on his website, republished by Pinch, and anthologized in Best American Essays 2008. In July 2010 Sarabande published a collection of his poetry titled "The Available World."

Monson is the editor of the literary magazine DIAGRAM, and the New Michigan Press. He lives in Tucson, Arizona, and teaches at University of Arizona.

== Awards ==
- 2006 New York Public Library's Young Lions Award finalist, for Other Electricities
- 2006 Graywolf Press Nonfiction Prize, for Neck Deep and Other Predicaments: Essays
- 2007 John C. Zacharis First Book Award from the literary journal Ploughshares, for Other Electricities
- 2007 Christopher Isherwood Foundation fellowship
- 2008 Great Lakes Colleges Association New Writers Award, for Neck Deep and Other Predicaments
- 2008 Knox College Junior Alumni Achievement Award
- 2010 National Book Critics Circle Finalist in Criticism for Vanishing Point
- 2017 Guggenheim Fellowship

== Bibliography ==
- Safety Features, New Michigan Press, 1999.
- Other Electricities, Sarabande Books, 2005.
- Vacationland, Tupelo Press, 2005.
- Neck Deep and Other Predicaments: Essays, Graywolf Press, 2007.
- Our Aperture, New Michigan Press, 2008.
- Vanishing Point: Not a Memoir, Graywolf Press, 2009.
- The Available World: Poems, Sarabande Books, 2010.
- Letter to a Future Lover: Marginalia, Errata, Secrets, Inscriptions, and Other Ephemera Found in Libraries, Graywolf Press, 2015.
- I Will Take the Answer: Essays, Graywolf Press, 2020.
- The Gnome Stories, Graywolf Press, 2020.
- Predator: A Memoir, a Movie, an Obsession, Graywolf Press, 2022.

=== Editor ===
- Ander Monson, ed. (2003). Diagram: Selections from the Magazine. Del Sol Press. ISBN 978-0-9725095-8-9.
- Ander Monson, ed. (2006). Diagram.2. Del Sol. ISBN 978-0-9762092-1-8.
- Ander Monson, ed. (2008). Diagram III. del Sol Press. ISBN 978-1-934832-04-2.
- Ander Monson and Craig Reinbold, ed. (2017). How We Speak to One Another. Coffee House Press. ISBN 978-1-56689-457-9.

=== Anthologies ===
- Adam Gopnik, Robert Atwan, ed. (October 8, 2008). "Solipsism". Best American Essays 2008. Mariner Books. ISBN 978-0-618-98322-3.
