= MVP (novel) =

2007 novel by James Boice

MVP is the debut novel of writer James Boice. It follows the life story of Gilbert Marcus, a star basketball player who rapes and kills a woman in a hotel room during the off-season. The prologue was featured in Esquire Magazine in September 2006. Publishers Weekly described it as a "stunning debut."
