= Maharashtra Vikas Party =

Political party in, Maharashtra, India

Maharashtra Vikas Party (Maharashtra Development Party) or the Nav Maharashtra Vikas Party, is a political party in the Indian state of Maharashtra. It evolved out of the Maratha Mahasangh. Vinayak Mete, who joined Maratha Mahasangh in 1986 after his studies, became its general secretary in 1994 and started the Nav Maharashtra Vikas Party in 1998 to gain some visibility as an independent leaders of the Marathwada identity.

It had some influence in Akola. In the 1998 local elections, the party had a tie-up with Indian National Congress.

It remained as a registered unrecognised party as per the Election Commission of India list even in 2016. Vinayak Mete died in August 2022.
