= It Came from the Closet: Queer Reflections on Horror =

2022 essay collection edited by Joe Vallese

- Editor: Joe Vallese
- Cover artist: Bráulio Amado
- Language: English
- Genre: Essay collection; LGBT literature
- Publisher: Feminist Press
- Publication date: October 4, 2022
- Publication place: United States
- Pages: 400
- ISBN: 978-1-95217-779-8

It Came from the Closet: Queer Reflections on Horror is a collection of essays about horror films as analysed by queer writers. Edited by writing professor Joe Vallese, the book was published by The Feminist Press at CUNY on October 4, 2022.

== Major themes ==
One of the main themes explored by some of the essays present in It Came from the Closet is the connection that some queer people might feel with the antagonist of the movie, which is exemplified by essays such as Sachiko Ragosta's, about Eyes Without a Face, and Viet Dinh's, who writes about Sleepaway Camp.

=== Essays and Discussed Films ===
- "A Demon-Girl's Guide to Life" by S. Trimble - The Exorcist
- "Both Ways" by Carmen Maria Machado - Jennifer's Body
- "My Hand on the Glass" by Bruce Owens Grimm - Hereditary
- "The Girl, the Well, the Ring" by Zefyr Lisowski - The Ring and Pet Semetary
- "Imprint" by Joe Vallese - Grace
- "Indescribable" by Carrow Narby - The Blob and Society
- "A Working Definition of the Monstrous" by Ryan Dzelzkalns - Godzilla
- "The Wolf in the Room" by Prince Shakur - Good Manners/As Boas Maneira
- "Three Men on a Boat" by Jen Corrigan - Jaws
- "The Wolf Man's Daughter" by Tosha R. Taylor - The Wolf Man
- "Twin/Skin" by Addie Tsai - Dead Ringers
- "Loving Annie Hayworth" by Laura Maw - The Birds
- "The Same Kind of Monster" by Jonathan Robbins Leon - The Leech Woman
- "Centered and Seen" by Sumiko Saulson - Candyman
- "Blood, Actually" by Grant Sutton - Friday the 13th Part 2
- "The Trail of His Flames" by Tucker Lieberman - A Nightmare on Elm Street
- "The Me in the Screen" by Steffan Triplett - Us
- "Sight Unseen" by Spencer Williams - The Blair Witch Project
- "Bad Hombre" by Sarah Fonseca - Is That You?/¿Eres tú, papá?
- "Black Body Snatchers" by Samuel Autman - Get Out
- "Long Nights in the Dark" by Richard Scott Larson - Halloween
- "On Beauty and Necrosis" by Sachiko Ragosta - Eyes Without a Face
- "Good Guys, Dolls" by Will Stockton - Child's Play
- "The Healed Body" by Jude Ellison S. Doyle - In My Skin/Dans ma peau
- "Notes on Sleepaway Camp" by Viet Dinh - Sleepaway Camp

== Reception ==
Halie Kerns, reviewing for the Library Journal, called it "[a]n excellent purchase for any film or queer studies collection" and noted that the themes of gender and sexuality, explored in a way they called "often purposefully grotesque", would be relatable to many of its readers. Publishers Weekly gave the book a starred review and called it a "stellar anthology" and added that "[t]here's not a weak piece in the pack".

A review for The Booklist said It Came from the Closet is easier to read than other studies on the same topic, due to the "essential context of [the writers'] own experiences." They commended Carmen Maria Machado for her essay on Jennifer's Body, calling it "particularly sublime." The reviewer called the collection "[a] critical text on the intersections of film, queer studies, and pop culture that will appeal to both academic and public-library audiences."

In a review published by Autostraddle, Abeni Jones talked about the usefulness of the collection to readers who might not necessarily enjoy horror films but who are looking for queer representation, citing essays on Jaws and The Birds as examples. Jones also praised the essays for not being overly analytical, saying "[t]hese are personal essays, not queer theory papers."
