= Portfolios of the Poor =

2009 book by Stuart Rutherford, Jonathan Morduch, Orlanda Ruthven, and Daryl Collins

Portfolios of the Poor: How the World's Poor Live on $2 a Day
- First edition
- Authors: Stuart Rutherford, Jonathan Morduch, Daryl Collins, Orlanda Ruthven
- Language: English
- Genre: Business, economics
- Publisher: Princeton University Press
- Publication date: January 9, 2009
- Publication place: United States
- Media type: Print
- Pages: 296 pp.
- ISBN: 978-1400829965
- OCLC: 940547709

Portfolios of the Poor: How the World's Poor Live on $2 a Day is a book that aims to systematically explain how the poor find solutions to their everyday financial problems. It is written by Stuart Rutherford, Jonathan Morduch, Orlanda Ruthven, and Daryl Collins.

== Background ==
The book is the culmination of 10 years of research into the financial lives of the lowest classes of Bangladesh, India, and South Africa—with a focus on those living on less than two dollars a day per person.

== Reception ==
In 2015 Mark Zuckerberg announced that he highly recommended everyone read Portfolios of the Poor. He wrote: "It's mind-blowing that almost half the world—almost 3 billion people—live on $2.50 a day or less. More than one billion people live on $1 a day or less. This book explains how these families invest their money to best support themselves. I hope reading this provides some insight into ways we can all work to support them better as well."

The New Yorker reported "while the authors do offer prescriptions for how to expand those options, it’s their scrupulous attention to actual behavior that makes this book invaluable." Reuters wrote "Portfolios of the Poor includes concrete ideas for moving forward. Getting there, though, requires us to first step back and listen."

"The book's methodology and conclusions are fascinating," Publishers Weekly concluded.
