= Eula Biss =

American non-fiction writer

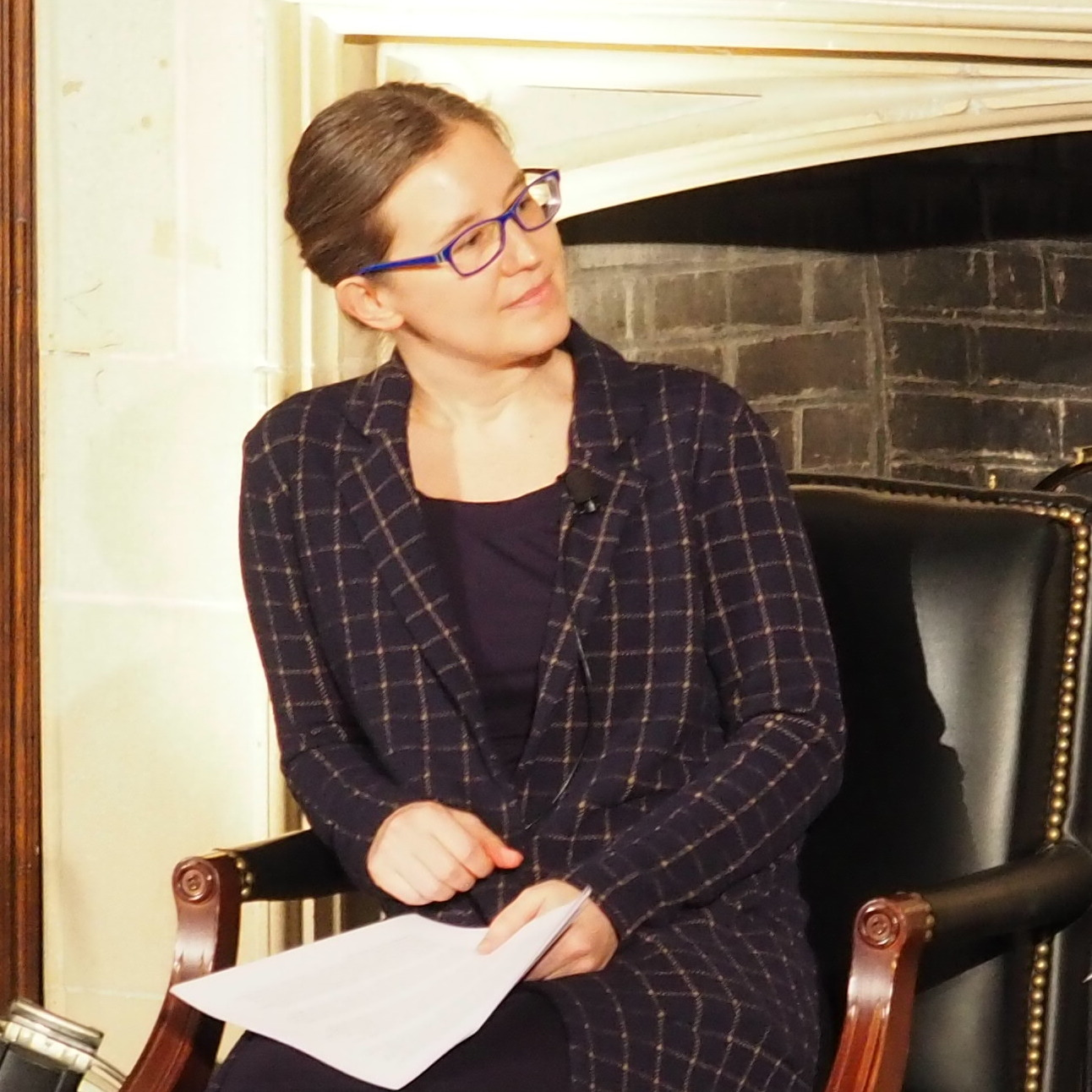
- Eula Biss (2019)
- Born: 1977 (age 48–49)
- Education: Hampshire College; University of Iowa
- Occupations: Author, Professor
- Spouse: John Bresland
- Writing career
- Genre: Non-Fiction
- Notable awards: Carl Sandburg Literary Award,

Eula Biss (born 1977) is an American non-fiction writer who is the author of four books.

Biss has won the Carl Sandburg Literary Award, the Rona Jaffe Foundation Writers' Award, the Graywolf Press Nonfiction Prize, the Pushcart Prize, and the National Book Critics Circle Award. She is a founding editor of Essay Press and a Guggenheim Fellow.

== Life and career ==
After earning a bachelor's degree in non-fiction writing from Hampshire College, Biss moved to New York City, San Diego, and then Iowa City, where she went on to complete her MFA in the University of Iowa's Nonfiction Writing Program.

Biss taught writing at Northwestern University for fifteen years, from 2006-2021. She is the author of four books and the founder of Essay Press. Her second book, Notes from No Man's Land, won the Graywolf Press Nonfiction Prize, and in March 2010, the National Book Critics Circle Award in the criticism category. Her third book, On Immunity: An Inoculation, was one of the New York Times Book Review's 10 Best Books of 2014 and was a finalist for the 2014 National Book Critics Circle Award (Criticism).

Biss lives in Northampton, MA. She is married to the writer John Bresland, and they have a son.

== Works ==
- The Balloonists, Hanging Loose Press, 2002, ISBN 978-1-931236-07-2
- Notes from No Man's Land, Graywolf Press, 2009, ISBN 978-1-55597-518-0
- On Immunity: An Inoculation, Graywolf Press, 2014, ISBN 978-1-55597-689-7
- Having and Being Had, Riverhead Books, 2020, ISBN 978-0525537458
