= Unnamed Press =

American independent publisher

- Founded: 2013
- Founders: C.P. Heiser, Olivia Taylor Smith
- Country of origin: United States
- Headquarters location: Los Angeles, California
- Distribution: Publishers Group West (USA)
- Fiction genres: Literary fiction and nonfiction
- Official website: www.unnamedpress.com

Unnamed Press is an independent publisher based in Los Angeles, California. It publishes literary fiction and non-fiction, with an emphasis on debuts by women, underrepresented voices and people of color, as well as internationally focused speculative fiction and fantasy. Its art director, Jaya Nicely, is an LA-based illustrator and designer.

Unnamed Press is distributed by Publishers Group West.

== History ==
Unnamed Press was founded in 2013 by C.P. Heiser and Olivia Taylor Smith after meeting in 2011 at the Los Angeles Review of Books and was originally intended to be an ebook-only publisher, focused on genre fiction set outside of the United States.

The press began with early success in publishing global fiction from Deji Bryce Olukotun (Nigerians in Space), Kristiina Ehin (Walker on Water), and Kazi Anis Ahmed (Good Night, Mr. Kissinger). It quickly evolved to a traditional publishing model, and now releases between 12 and 15 print titles per year.

In 2018, Unnamed Press reached a milestone of 50 books published.

In July 2024, Publishers Weekly reported that Unnamed Press had formed Smith & Taylor Classics, a new imprint helmed by acquiring editors Allison Miriam Woodnutt (née Smith) and Brandon Taylor, which will be dedicated to publishing lesser-known works by familiar and acclaimed authors.

== Publishing ==
Authors published by Unnamed Press include Pulitzer Prize-winner Dale Maharidge, Man-Booker Prize-winner Jennifer Croft, Fariha Róisín, Ken Dychtwald, Alex Espinoza, Bethany C. Morrow, Jessie Chaffee, Malu Halasa, Agnès Desarthe, Saad Z. Hossain, Stefan G. Bucher, Margaret Wappler, Janet Capron, Joe Halstead, David Ulin, Henrietta Rose-Innes, Kazi Anis Ahmed, Merle Kröger, James Boice (writer), Janice Pariat, J.M. Servin, Bette Adriaanse, among others.

In 2016, Unnamed author Esmé Weijun Wang was selected as a Granta Best Young American Novelist for her debut novel Border of Paradise, released by the press that same year. Esmé was also selected as a 2018 Whiting Award winner for her forthcoming collection of essays from Graywolf Press.

In 2017, Unnamed published After the Flare by Deji Bryce Olukotun — a follow-up science fiction thriller and sequel to the first book issued by the press (Nigerians in Space). After the Flare was named a finalist and won Special Citation for the 2018 Philip K. Dick Award.

In 2020, Unnamed author Jennifer Croft won the nonfiction William Saroyan International Prize for Writing for Homesick. Croft won the 2018 Man Booker International Prize for her translation from Polish of Olga Tokarczuk’s Flights.
