= Moisés Naím =

Venezuelan journalist and writer (born 1952)

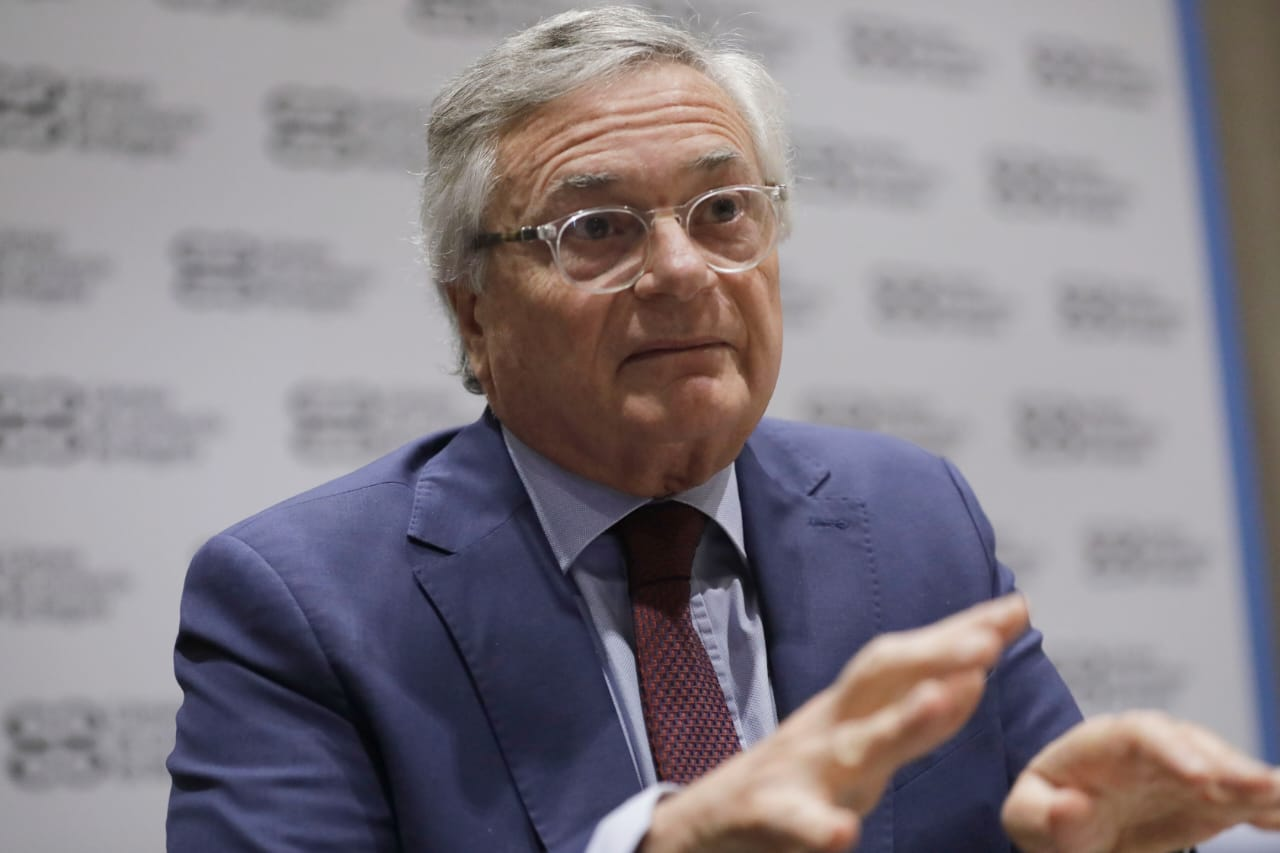
- Naím in 2019

Minister of Trade and Industry
- In office 1989–1990
- President: Carlos Andrés Pérez
- Succeeded by: Imelda Cisneros

Personal details
- Born: July 5, 1952 (age 74) Tripoli, Libya
- Education: Massachusetts Institute of Technology
- Occupation: Distinguished Fellow at the Carnegie Endowment for International Peace
- Profession: Journalist
- Website: www.moisesnaim.com

Moisés Naím (born July 5, 1952) is a Venezuelan journalist and writer. He is a Distinguished Fellow at the Carnegie Endowment for International Peace.

Naím was the editor-in-chief of Foreign Policy magazine for 14 years (1996–2010). Since 2012, he has directed and hosted Efecto Naím, a weekly televised news program on the economy and international affairs that airs throughout the Americas on NTN24. In 2011, he received the Ortega y Gasset Award for his important contribution to journalism in the Spanish language.

He is the former Minister of Trade and Industry for Venezuela, director of its central bank, and executive director of the World Bank. Naím is also the founder and chairman of the Group of Fifty and a member of the Council on Foreign Relations, the Inter-American Dialogue, and the World Economic Forum.

== Education ==
Naím studied at the Universidad Metropolitana in Caracas, Venezuela. Following his undergraduate studies, he attended the Massachusetts Institute of Technology, where he obtained both a Master of Science and doctorate degrees in the late 1970s. His dissertation was titled, "The Political Economy of Regulating Multinational Corporations".

== Public service ==
Naím was a professor of business strategy and industrial economics at Instituto de Estudios Superiores de Administración (IESA), Venezuela's leading business school and research center located in Caracas. He also was its Dean from 1979 to 1986.

From 1989 to 1990, Naím served as Venezuela's Minister of Trade and Industry, in Carlos Andrés Pérez's second cabinet. Naím wrote about his experience in his 1993 book, "Paper Tigers and Minotaurs" and spoke about it in an interview with journalist Mirtha Rivero.

== Journalism career ==
Naím was the chief international columnist for El País. His column, "The Global Observer", was also published in Italy (La Repubblica), France (Slate.fr), and in the major newspapers of Latin America. For several years, he was a contributing editor to The Atlantic.

Naím's work has appeared in: The New York Times, The Washington Post, The Financial Times, Newsweek, Time, Le Monde and Berliner Zeitung.

In 1996, Naím became the editor-in-chief of "Foreign Policy" magazine. While Naím worked there, Foreign Policy won the National Magazine Awards for General Excellence three times and it changed from being an academic quarterly to a bimonthly glossy. In 2008 the magazine was sold to The Washington Post Company. Naím remained editor-in-chief until 2010.

== Published books ==
Naím is the author or editor of more than fifteen books on topics related to geopolitics, international economics, and economic development.

Naím's newest book Charlatanes ( Charlatans, How Grifters, Swindlers and Hucksters Bamboozle the Media, the Market and the Masses). Published in 2025.

Lo que nos esta pasando: 121 Ideas para escudriñar el siglo XXI ( What's Happening to Us, A compilation of essays and columns analyzing global phenomena from artificial intelligence to geopolitical shifts. Published in 2024.

The Revenge of Power: How Autocrats Are Reinventing Politics for the 21st Century. published in February 2022.

Naím's book Dos Espías en Caracas (Two Spies in Caracas) was published in Spanish in late 2018 and in English in the summer of 2021. It is a novel of espionage intertwined with a love story.

In 2013, he published The End of Power: From Boardrooms to Battlefields and Churches to States, Why Being in Charge Isn't What It Used To Be (2013). In it he argues that power has become "easier to get, harder to use, and easier to lose" due to the demographic explosion, increase in geographic mobility, and a shift in cultural norms. Both the Financial Times and the Washington Post named it one of the best books of 2013, and was widely reviewed. In 2015, it was selected by Facebook CEO Mark Zuckerberg as the inaugural book for the Mark Zuckerberg book club, a public resolution to read one new book every two weeks in 2015.

In 2005, his book Illicit: How Smugglers, Traffickers, and Copycats are Hijacking the Global Economy was selected by the Washington Post as one of the best non-fiction books of the year; it was published in 14 languages and is the basis of a documentary produced by National Geographic Film and Television in 2010.

== Efecto Naím ==
Efecto Naím is a weekly television show that offers a vision of the changing world. As director and host, Naím presents brief reports on global tendencies and interviews political, business, media, scientific, and cultural leaders. It airs throughout Latin America every Sunday via DirecTV NTN24.

== Awards and recognition ==
- Between 2014 and 2017 the Gottlieb Duttweiler Institute ranked Naím among the top 100 most influential global thought leaders.
- In 2013, Naím was listed as one of the world's leading thinkers by the British magazine Prospect.
- In 2011, Naím was awarded the Ortega y Gasset Journalism Award for lifetime achievement/career trajectory.
- In 2003, the Republic of Argentina honored Naím with the Order of May with the grade of Commander, one of the highest decorations the country presents for foreigners.
- In 1991, Francesco Cossiga, the President of Italy, honored Naim with the National Order of Merit, with the grade "Commendatore."
- In 1990, François Mitterrand, the President of France honored Naím with the National Order of Merit with the grade of Grand Officer (29 June 1991).
- In 1985, Moisés Naím was honored with the Order of Andres Bello from the Republic of Venezuela.

== Publications ==
=== Books ===
- Naím, Moisés (2025) Charlatanes ( Charlatans, How Grifters, Swindlers and Hucksters Bamboozle the Media, the Market and the Masses)
- Naím, Moisés (2024) Lo que nos esta pasando: 121 Ideas para escudriñar el siglo XXI (What's Happening to Us).
- Naím, Moisés (2022). The Revenge of Power: How Autocrats Are Reinventing Politics for the 21st Century. ISBN 978-125-027-920-0.
- Naím, Moisés (2021). Two Spies in Caracas. ISBN 978-1542016698.
- Naím, Moisés (2018). Dos Espías en Caracas. ISBN 978-8-4666-6551-3.
- Naím, Moisés (2016). Rethinking the world: 111 surprises of the XXI century. ISBN 978-8-4999-2647-6.
- Naím, Moisés (2013). The End of Power: From Boardrooms to Battlefields and Churches to States, Why Being In Charge Isn't What It Used to Be. ISBN 978-0-4650-6568-4.
- ——; Danna, Serena (2011). Prodotto interno mafia. [Einaudi, Torino]. ISBN 978-8-8062-0798-4.
- Naím, Moisés (2006). Illicit: How Smugglers, Traffickers, and Copycats are Hijacking the Global Economy. Anchor. ISBN 978-1-4000-7884-4.
- ——; Smith, Gordon (2000). Altered States: Globalization, Sovereignty, and Governance. IDRC Books. ISBN 978-0-88936-917-7.
- ——; Tulchin, Joseph (1999). Competition Policy, Deregulation and Modernization in Latin America. Lynne Rienner Publishers. ISBN 1-55587-818-0.
- ——; Edwards, Sebastian (1998). Mexico 1994: Anatomy of an Emerging-Market Crash. Carnegie Endowment for International Peace. ISBN 0-87003-154-6.
- ——; Goodman, Louis W.; Forman, Johanna Mendelson; Tulchin, Joseph S. & Bland, Gary (1995). Lessons of the Venezuelan Experience. Woodrow Wilson Center Press. ISBN 978-0-943875-66-8.
- Naím, Moisés (1993). Paper Tigers and Minotaurs. Carnegie Endowment for International Peace. ISBN 978-0-87003-026-0.
- ——; Piñango, Ramón (1993). El caso Venezuela: una ilusión de armonia. Instituto de Estudios Superiores de Administracion.
- Naím, Moisés (1989). Las empresas venezolanas: su gerencia. Instituto de Estudios Superiores de Administracion.
- Naím, Moisés (1982). Multinacionales: La Economía Política de las Inversiones Extranjeras. Instituto de Estudios Superiores de Administracion.
- ——; Francés, A.; Tello, M. T. (1981). Competencia y Regulación: Alternativas para la Economía Venezolana. Instituto de Estudios Superiores de Administracion.
- ——; Gil, J. A.; Romero, A. (1980). Introducción al Análisis de las Políticas en Venezuela. Caracas CONICIT.
