= Unstuck =

American literary magazine

- Unstuck 1 cover
- Editor: Matt Williamson
- Categories: Literary magazine
- Frequency: Annual
- Founded: 2011
- Final issue: October 2014
- Country: United States
- Based in: Austin, Texas
- Website: unstuckbooks.org

Unstuck was an American literary magazine based in Austin, Texas that published fiction and poetry. Since its first volume, released in the fall of 2011, Unstuck was devoted to breaking down traditional genre fiction barriers. Past contributors include Aimee Bender, J. Robert Lennon, Kevin Brockmeier, Jonathan Lethem, Elizabeth McCracken, Rick Moody, Etgar Keret, Edward Carey, Dean Young, Amelia Gray, Lincoln Michel, Helen Phillips, Marisa Matarazzo, and Joe Meno. The magazine was published annually.

Stories published during the initial three-issue run of Unstuck were later reprinted in Harper's (Mary Ruefle's "The Gift"), Best American Nonrequired Reading (Tom McAllister's "Things You're Not Proud Of"), and Electric Literature's Recommended Reading (multiple stories), among numerous other anthologies. Julia Whicker's forthcoming novel Wonderblood first appeared, in part, as a story in the debut issue of Unstuck.

Following the release of its third issue, the magazine went on hiatus. Initially announced as an 18-month hiatus, by October 2014, its Twitter and Facebook accounts appear to have been discontinued. Only three issues of the Unstuck Literary Annual were released during the five-year period between the release of issue 1 and the end of its announced hiatus. It is unclear when, or if, future volumes will be published.

As of November, 2017, its website is defunct.
