= Graywolf Press =

American independent, non-profit publisher

- Founded: 1974
- Founders: Scott Walker and Kathleen Foster
- Successor: Carmen Giménez
- Country of origin: United States
- Headquarters location: Minneapolis, Minnesota, U.S.
- Distribution: Farrar, Straus and Giroux (Macmillan) (US); Turnaround Publisher Services (UK)
- Official website: www.graywolfpress.org

Graywolf Press is an independent, non-profit publisher located in Minneapolis, Minnesota. Graywolf Press publishes fiction, non-fiction, and poetry.

Graywolf Press collaborates with organizations such as the College of Saint Benedict, the Mellon Foundation, and Farrar, Straus and Giroux.

Graywolf Press currently publishes about 27 books a year, including the Graywolf Press Nonfiction Prize winner, the recipient of the Emily Dickinson First Book Award, and several translations supported by the Lannan Foundation.

== History ==
Graywolf Press was founded by Scott Walker and Kathleen Foster in 1974, in a space provided by Copper Canyon Press in Port Townsend, Washington. The press was named for the nearby Graywolf Ridge and Graywolf River, and for the canid. The press had early successes publishing poetry heavyweights such as Denis Johnson and Tess Gallagher. In 1984, Graywolf Press was incorporated as a 501(c)3 non-profit organization, and moved to St. Paul, Minnesota, in 1985 with the support of the National Endowment for the Arts. Fiona McCrae, formerly of Faber and Faber, became the director of Graywolf Press in 1994, following the departure of Scott Walker. In 2009, Graywolf Press moved its publishing operations to the historic Warehouse District of downtown Minneapolis, Minnesota. In 2022, Carmen Giménez became the Executive Director and Publisher.

== Books and authors ==
The Graywolf publication list includes novels, short stories, memoirs, essays, and poetry by writers such as Maggie Nelson, Deb Olin Unferth, Eula Biss, Elizabeth Alexander, Kevin Barry, Charles Baxter, Sven Birkerts, Ron Carlson, Maile Chapman, Mark Doten, Percival Everett, James Franco, Dana Gioia, Albert Goldbarth, Linda Gregg, Eamon Grennan, Matthea Harvey, Tony Hoagland, Jane Kenyon, William Kittredge, J. Robert Lennon, Carmen Maria Machado, Ander Monson, Per Petterson, Benjamin Percy, Carl Phillips, Max Porter, Catie Rosemurgy, Tracy K. Smith, A. Igoni Barrett, Nuruddin Farah, William Stafford, David Treuer, Brenda Ueland, Binyavanga Wainaina, and Yang Shuang-zi.

== Awards ==
Graywolf Press won the 2015 AWP Small Press Publisher Award given by the Association of Writers & Writing Programs that "acknowledges the hard work, creativity, and innovation" of small presses and "their contributions to the literary landscape" of the US.

== Graywolf Press Prizes ==
The Graywolf Press Nonfiction Prize, founded in 2005, "seeks to acknowledge – and honor – the great traditions of literary nonfiction” by publishing “the boldest and most innovative books from emerging nonfiction writers" (Robert Polito). Submissions of finished books to the Nonfiction Prize are welcomed from previously unpublished U.S. authors. The winner is announced in April of each year. Graywolf also oversees publication of winners of the Academy of American Poets' Walt Whitman Award, as well as every third winner of the Cave Canem Poetry Prize.

In September 2025, Graywolf Press announced that they were no longer accepting submissions for or awarding the Graywolf Press Nonfiction Prize.

=== Graywolf Press Nonfiction Prize winners ===
- 2022: Pochangmacha People by Jung Hae Chae
- 2020: Voice of the Fish by Lars Horn
- 2018: Zat Lun by Thirii Myo Kyaw Myint
- 2017: The Collected Schizophrenias by Esmé Weijun Wang
- 2014: Riverine by Angela Palm
- 2013: Leaving Orbit: Notes from the Last Days of American Spaceflight by Margaret Lazarus Dean
- 2011: The Empathy Exams: Essays by Leslie Jamison
- 2010: The Grey Album by Kevin Young
- 2008: Notes from No Man's Land by Eula Biss
- 2007: Black Glasses Like Clark Kent by Terese Svoboda
- 2006: Neck Deep and Other Predicaments by Ander Monson
- 2005: Frantic Transmissions to and from Los Angeles by Kate Braverman

=== Graywolf Press Africa Prize winners ===
Since 2018, Graywolf Press has also awarded a prize for "a first novel manuscript by an African author primarily residing in Africa." The winners include:

- 2023: The Freedom of Birds by Kiprop Kimutai
- 2022: No prize awarded
- 2019: American Girl and Boy from Shobrakheit by Noor Naga
- 2018: The House of Rust by Khadija Abdalla Bajaber

=== Pegasus Poetry Book Prize ===
In November 2025, Poetry Foundation and Graywolf Press announced a joint prize between the two organizations, with the first prize to be awarded in October 2026. People eligible to win this prize are "United States poet[s] aged 40 or older for their first or second poetry collection."
