= The Butcher's Knife Cares Not for the Lamb's Cry =

- Star Trek: Discovery episode
- Episode no.: Season 1 Episode 4
- Directed by: Olatunde Osunsanmi
- Teleplay by: Jesse Alexander; Aron Eli Coleite
- Cinematography by: Colin Hoult
- Editing by: Andrew Coutts; Cecily Rhett
- Original air date: October 8, 2017
- Running time: 49 minutes

Guest appearances
- Michelle Yeoh as Capt. Philippa Georgiou; Jayne Brook as ADM Katrina Cornwell; Mary Chieffo as L'Rell; Wilson Cruz as Dr. Hugh Culber; Kenneth Mitchell as Kol; Rekha Sharma as CDR Ellen Landry

Episode chronology
← Previous "Context Is for Kings"	Next → "Choose Your Pain"
- Star Trek: Discovery season 1

"The Butcher's Knife Cares Not for the Lamb's Cry" is the fourth episode of the first season of the American television series Star Trek: Discovery, which is set roughly a decade before the events of the original Star Trek series and explores the war between the Federation and the Klingons. The episode was written by Jesse Alexander and Aron Eli Coleite. It was directed by Olatunde Osunsanmi.

Sonequa Martin-Green stars as Michael Burnham, the first Starfleet mutineer who began the war. Series regulars Doug Jones, Anthony Rapp, Mary Wiseman, and Jason Isaacs also appear in the episode.

"The Butcher's Knife Cares Not for the Lamb's Cry" was released on CBS All Access on October 8, 2017.

== Plot ==
Michael Burnham receives the replicated uniform of a Discovery crewmember, without Starfleet insignia. She receives a parcel with the will of Captain Georgiou, but cannot bring herself to open it. Saru is unhappy with Burnham's presence aboard the Discovery. The ship's crew is conducting a simulated battle with the Klingons and is repeatedly losing. Lorca assigns Burnham to study the creature from the Glenn, a giant Tardigrade which destroyed a dozen Klingons, and find a way to use its biology as a weapon.

Starfleet Admiral Cornwall orders Discovery to the dilithium mining colony Corvan II, which is under Klingon attack. Corvan's workers extract 40% of the Federation's dilithium, which is needed for traditional subspace jumps. Stamets is reluctant to make such a long jump using the spore drive. Lorca suggests that he proceed by trial and error. When the spore drive is activated, Discovery nearly collides with a star. The Tardigrade reacts madly during the jump. Lorca threatens Stamets and forces him to continue the journey to Corvan, playing the distress call from the colony over the ship's internal communication system for the entire crew to hear. Lorca sends Commander Landry to keep Burnham's research on track, and Landry attempts to sedate the Tardigrade (which she names Ripper) to cut off its claw; it kills her.

On T'Kuvma's stranded ship, Klingon leader Kol bribes T'Kuvma's desperate followers with food to earn their loyalty, and leaves Voq to die in the wreckage of the Shenzhou.

With the help of the reactions of Saru's threat ganglia, Burnham becomes convinced that Ripper was acting in self-defense. After learning about the reaction of the Tardigrade to the jump and its symbiotic connection with the spores, Stamets and Burnham transport the creature to Engineering. The Tardigrade connects to the spore drive and interfaces with the navigation system, acting as a supercomputer to calculate navigation coordinates. Discovery successfully makes the jump to the Corvan II colony and destroys the enemy ships, then disappears.

L'Rell, a Klingon who is secretly loyal to Voq, promises a way for them to win the war for the house of T'Kuvma. She tells him that the matriarchs of the House of Mokai are ready to help, but that he must sacrifice everything.

After the jump, Burnham visits the creature, which appears to be ill. Tilly persuades Burnham to open the package from Captain Georgiou. Burnham discovers that Philippa Georgiou bequeathed her a family heirloom - her telescope.

== Production ==
=== Casting ===
The series stars Sonequa Martin-Green as Michael Burnham, Doug Jones as Saru, Shazad Latif as Ash Tyler, Anthony Rapp as Paul Stamets, Mary Wiseman as Sylvia Tilly, and Jason Isaacs as Gabriel Lorca. Additionally, guest star Rekha Sharma was cast as Discovery's security officer Commander Landry at the end of April 2017.

In November 2016, series' writer and consulting producer Nicholas Meyer mentioned that Michelle Yeoh had been cast in Discovery, and she was soon confirmed to be portraying Captain Georgiou of the USS Shenzhou. Yeoh appears in this episode as a hologram of Georgiou.

== Release ==
"The Butcher's Knife Cares Not for the Lamb's Cry" was made available on CBS All Access on October 8, 2017. In Canada, it was broadcast on the specialty channels Space (English) and Z (French), before being streamed on CraveTV. In 188 other countries, the episode was released on Netflix within 24 hours of its U.S. debut.

== Critical response ==
The review aggregator website Rotten Tomatoes reported an 82% approval rating with an average rating of 7.30/10 based on 22 reviews. The website's critical consensus reads, "With 'The Butcher's Knife Cares Not for the Lamb's Cry,' Star Trek: Discovery plays to its strengths, advancing major plots and further refining core characters."

Michael Ahr of Den of Geek expressed concern about Discovery's ongoing departures from the traditional moral foundations of the Star Trek franchise, as well as viewers' advance knowledge that the spore drive would fail to supplant ordinary warp drive as Star Trek's timeline continued. He found himself more sympathetic toward Voq and L'Rell than the Starfleet characters, asking, "Does the sympathy for the enemy spring from the unlikability of those in charge of Discovery? Or does Michael's transformation from pariah to pillar of moral judgment trump everything?" Megan Davies at Digital Spy called the episode "fast-paced". She noted that Burnham was "beginning to feel a little overshadowed by the characters around her" and was less impressed by the Klingon subplot than by the rest of the episode, but concluded that "the show hasn't let this war-torn universe detract from the human elements that help ground bold, sci-fi stories like this one is shaping up to be."

For IGN, Scott Collura scored the episode a "great" 8.5 out of 10, feeling that the episode fleshed out some of the characters and made clearer how the show would proceed going forward, commenting, "that's what this show is about, now we know -- finding out how Michael Burnham redeems herself." Writing for Tor.com, science fiction and fantasy writer Keith DeCandido called "The Butcher's Knife Cares Not for the Lamb's Cry" "a damn fine episode that tells a very good—and a very Star Trek—story in its hour while continuing the seasonal arc along", but criticized the slow pace of the Klingon scenes due to the use of the Klingon language in dialogue. Zack Handlen of The A.V. Club graded the episode a 'B−', finding it poorly structured and suffering from excessive subplots and forced conflict. Handlen described Landry's demise as "an ugly, stupid death with no dramatic weight that only serves to make the Discovery's crew seem that much smaller."

Reviewing for The New York Times, Sopan Deb compared the Klingons' viewpoints to those expressed at the August 2017 Unite the Right rally in Charlottesville, Virginia, commenting, "Politics permeate every part of our lives now. Late night comedy. N.F.L. games. Why should 'Star Trek' be any different?" He described Georgiou's posthumous fate, eaten by Voq's crew, as "A worse fate for a great captain than Kirk's!" Deb also praised the burgeoning friendship between Burnham and Tilly, describing them as "two characters that actually tolerate each other's presence, which is more than can be said of every other crew member on the Discovery."

Writing for ScififantasyNetwork.com, Hazel Butler said, "Frankly I'm impressed Star Trek: Discovery made it to the fourth episode before I had any serious gripes... The Butcher's Knife Cares Not For The Lamb's Cry is an absolute mess. There is no unifying thread throughout the episode... I'd just rather they created the emotional climax of the episode through genuine plot development rather than cheap tricks."
