= After Trek =

Aftershow for Star Trek: Discovery

- Genre: Aftershow
- Presented by: Matt Mira
- Country of origin: United States
- No. of seasons: 1
- No. of episodes: 14

Production
- Executive producers: Michael Davies; Rod Roddenberry; Trevor Roth
- Running time: 35–57 minutes
- Production companies: Embassy Row; Roddenberry Entertainment

Original release
- Network: CBS All Access
- Release: September 24, 2017 – February 11, 2018

Related
- Star Trek: Discovery

After Trek is a live American aftershow hosted by Matt Mira on CBS All Access, in which Mira discusses episodes of the All Access television series Star Trek: Discovery with guests, including cast and crew members from the series as well as celebrity fans. It was produced by Embassy Row in association with Roddenberry Entertainment.

Work on an aftershow for Discovery began by July 2016, taking inspiration from previous aftershows created by Embassy Row such as Talking Dead and Talking Bad. Episodes of After Trek were released on All Access after each episode of Discovery was released, beginning with that show's premiere on September 24, 2017, and running through to its season finale on February 11, 2018. In addition to guest interviews, each episode of the aftershow also included live interactive polls and behind-the-scenes segments.

By June 2018, CBS had decided to re-imagine After Trek for the second season of Discovery. In January 2019, After Trek was canceled and replaced by The Ready Room, a new interview-based aftershow hosted by Naomi Kyle before being replaced by Wil Wheaton in 2020.

== Development ==
By July 2016, CBS was working on an aftershow companion series to its new CBS All Access television series Star Trek: Discovery, similar in format to AMC's The Walking Dead companion series Talking Dead. The show would air live on All Access after each episode of Discovery, and would feature "celebrity Trekkies", former Star Trek actors", as well as cast and crew members from Discovery. The companion series was confirmed in May 2017, with the title Talking Trek. In August, CBS revealed that Embassy Row, the company behind popular aftershow companion series Talking Dead and Talking Bad, would be producing Talking Trek. Michael Davies was set to executive produce alongside Roddenberry Entertainment's Rod Roddenberry and Trevor Roth, with the show's episodes planned to run for 30–40 minutes. The next month, Matt Mira was announced as host of the aftershow, which was renamed After Trek.

== Format ==
Each episode of the series is filmed in a studio, on a set that was constructed in two days and features different Discovery-inspired decorations. Mira discusses the Discovery episode, and other aspects of the series, with the After Trek guests for that week, while graphics are displayed featuring trivia about Discovery. Commercial breaks are book-ended by Star Trek trivia questions that the audience members watching the live stream could participate in answering using interactive polls at the website aftertrek.tv. Each aftershow episode also includes pre-produced behind-the-scenes segments about the making of Discovery, and ends with a preview clip of the next episode of Discovery.

== Episodes ==
No.	Episode(s) discussed	Guests	Original release date
1	"The Vulcan Hello" "Battle at the Binary Stars"	Aaron Harberts and James Frain	September 24, 2017
2	"Context Is for Kings"	Aaron Harberts and Mary Wiseman	October 1, 2017
3	"The Butcher's Knife Cares Not for the Lamb's Cry"	Jason Isaacs, Doug Jones, Aaron Harberts, and Gretchen J. Berg	October 8, 2017
4	"Choose Your Pain"	Mary Chieffo, Kenneth Mitchell, Aaron Harberts, and Gretchen J. Berg	October 15, 2017
5	"Lethe"	Gretchen J. Berg	October 22, 2017
6	"Magic to Make the Sanest Man Go Mad"	Anthony Rapp, Wilson Cruz, and Rainn Wilson	October 29, 2017
7	"Si Vis Pacem, Para Bellum"	Jayne Brook, Doug Jones, and Ted Sullivan	November 5, 2017
8	"Into the Forest I Go"	Sonequa Martin-Green, Mary Wiseman, Bo Yeon Kim, and Erika Lippoldt	November 12, 2017
9	"Despite Yourself"	Wilson Cruz, Mary Chieffo, Aaron Harberts, Gretchen J. Berg, and Sam Vartholomeos	January 7, 2018
10	"The Wolf Inside"	Shazad Latif and Ted Sullivan	January 14, 2018
11	"Vaulting Ambition"	Anthony Rapp and Jonathan Frakes	January 21, 2018
12	"What's Past Is Prologue"	Rekha Sharma, Jason Isaacs, and Ted Sullivan	January 28, 2018
13	"The War Without, The War Within"	Doug Jones, Olatunde Osunsanmi, and Justin Simien	February 4, 2018
14	"Will You Take My Hand?"	Sonequa Martin-Green, Anthony Rapp, Alex Kurtzman, Aaron Harberts, and Gretchen J. Berg	February 11, 2018

== Release ==
After Trek premiered on September 24, 2017, streaming live on CBS All Access following the release of the first Star Trek: Discovery episodes. Episodes are also available to stream on demand by All Access subscribers. Outside of the United States, episodes were aired on Space in Canada following the broadcast of Discovery there, and they are available on demand on Netflix for another 188 countries where Discovery is also made available on demand within 24 hours of the U.S. debut.

== Cancellation ==
In June 2018, after production on the second season of Discovery had begun, a CBS spokesperson said the network was "reimagining" After Trek for the next season. The statement added that the next iteration of the talk show would "continue to have all the fan-driven elements that Star Trek: Discovery viewers enjoyed this season and more." In January 2019, it was announced that After Trek had been canceled and was being replaced by weekly Facebook Live events to be streamed the day after each Discovery episode was released. These Facebook Live events were soon revealed to be a new interview-style aftershow named The Ready Room, hosted by Naomi Kyle.
