= The Ready Room =

Aftershow for Paramount+'s Star Trek series

- Genre: Aftershow
- Presented by: Naomi Kyle; Wil Wheaton
- Country of origin: United States
- No. of episodes: 107

Production
- Running time: 14–56 minutes

Original release
- Network: CBS All Access
- Release: January 26, 2019 – January 7, 2021
- Network: Paramount+
- Release: August 12, 2021 – December 19, 2024

Related
- Star Trek: Discovery; Star Trek: Picard; Star Trek: Lower Decks; Star Trek: Prodigy; Star Trek: Strange New Worlds

The Ready Room is an American aftershow on CBS All Access (later rebranded as Paramount+) in which a host discusses episodes of a first-run Star Trek television series on the service with cast and crew members from that series. It replaced After Trek, an aftershow for the first season of Star Trek: Discovery (2017–18).

In January 2019, CBS revealed plans to re-imagine After Trek for the second season of Discovery (2019). The Ready Room was announced shortly after, with Naomi Kyle as host. In January 2020, Star Trek actor Wil Wheaton was named as host for a second season of The Ready Room, serving as an aftershow for the first season of Star Trek: Picard (2020). Wheaton returned to host aftershow episodes for each season of Star Trek: Lower Decks (2020–2024); the third, fourth, and fifth seasons of Discovery (2020–2024); the first season of Star Trek: Prodigy (2021–22); the second and third seasons of Picard (2022–23); and the first and second seasons of Star Trek: Strange New Worlds (2022–23).

The Ready Room was also released on Facebook Live, IGTV, and YouTube. Wheaton indicated in December 2024 that the series had ended.

== Development ==
CBS announced an aftershow companion series to its CBS All Access television series Star Trek: Discovery in May 2017. Titled After Trek, it was hosted by Matt Mira and streamed live on All Access following the release of Discovery episodes. By June 2018, with production on the second season of Discovery underway, CBS was "reimagining" After Trek for the next season. The network said the next iteration would "continue to have all the fan-driven elements that Star Trek: Discovery viewers enjoyed this season and more."

In January 2019, CBS announced that After Trek had been canceled and was being replaced by weekly Facebook Live events to be streamed the day after each Discovery episode was released. These Facebook Live events were soon revealed to be a new interview-style aftershow named The Ready Room, hosted by Naomi Kyle. The title comes from the captain's private room onboard many Star Trek starships. In January 2020, CBS announced a second season of The Ready Room would serve as the aftershow for its new series Star Trek: Picard, with former Star Trek: The Next Generation cast member Wil Wheaton taking over as host for the season.

Wheaton returned for a bonus episode, recorded remotely due to the COVID-19 pandemic, that focuses on the making of the first season of Picard. It was released in July 2020. Wheaton then hosted several special episodes of The Ready Room that accompany key episodes of the new animated series Star Trek: Lower Decks, before hosting a new season of The Ready Room with aftershows for each episode of the third season of Discovery.

In 2022 Wheaton returned as host for the second season of Picard. He also hosts aftershows for the third season in 2023, though was omitted from the season's announced Next Generation cast reunion. He has preferred writing and hosting to acting, and said in 2020 that he only takes "incredible" roles he "feels really good about". Wheaton returns as Wesley Crusher in Picard's second-season finale, which he discusses in the aftershow for the premiere of Star Trek: Strange New Worlds.

The aftershow episode for Lower Decks's final season, released in December 2024, ends with comments from Wheaton which were interpreted as a farewell and an indication that the series had ended.

== Episodes ==
| Season | Host | Episodes | Originally released | | |
| Season | Host | Episodes | First released | Last released | Network |
|---|---|---|---|---|---|
| Discovery S2 | Naomi Kyle | 13 | January 26, 2019 | April 19, 2019 | CBS All Access |
| Picard S1 | Wil Wheaton | 11 | January 23, 2020 | July 2, 2020 | CBS All Access |
| Lower Decks S1 | Wil Wheaton | 3 | August 6, 2020 | October 8, 2020 | CBS All Access |
| Discovery S3 | Wil Wheaton | 13 | October 15, 2020 | January 7, 2021 | CBS All Access |
| Lower Decks S2 | Wil Wheaton | 2 | August 12, 2021 | October 14, 2021 | Paramount+ |
| Prodigy S1 | Wil Wheaton | 2 | October 28, 2021 | December 29, 2022 | Paramount+ |
| Discovery S4 | Wil Wheaton | 11 | November 18, 2021 | March 17, 2022 | Paramount+ |
| Picard S2 | Wil Wheaton | 8 | March 3, 2022 | April 28, 2022 | Paramount+ |
| Strange New Worlds S1 | Wil Wheaton | 10 | May 5, 2022 | July 7, 2022 | Paramount+ |
| Lower Decks S3 | Wil Wheaton | 3 | August 25, 2022 | October 27, 2022 | Paramount+ |
| Picard S3 | Wil Wheaton | 10 | February 16, 2023 | April 22, 2023 | Paramount+ |
| Strange New Worlds S2 | Wil Wheaton | 10 | June 15, 2023 | August 10, 2023 | Paramount+ |
| Lower Decks S4 | Wil Wheaton | 1 | November 2, 2023 | | Paramount+ |
| Discovery S5 | Wil Wheaton | 9 | April 4, 2024 | May 30, 2024 | Paramount+ |
| Lower Decks S5 | Wil Wheaton | 1 | December 19, 2024 | | Paramount+ |

=== Discovery season 2 (2019) ===
The first season of The Ready Room is an aftershow for the second season of Star Trek: Discovery, with Naomi Kyle as host. Episodes were released the day after an episode of Discovery, on Facebook Live as well as CBS All Access.

| No. overall | No. in season | Episode(s) discussed | Guests | Original release date |
|---|---|---|---|---|
| 1 | 1 | "Brother" "New Eden" | Alex Kurtzman and Heather Kadin | January 26, 2019 |
| 2 | 2 | "Point of Light" | Mary Chieffo | February 4, 2019 |
| 3 | 3 | "An Obol for Charon" | Anthony Rapp | February 8, 2019 |
| 4 | 4 | "Saints of Imperfection" | Wilson Cruz | February 15, 2019 |
| 5 | 5 | "The Sound of Thunder" | Doug Jones | February 22, 2019 |
| 6 | 6 | "Light and Shadows" | James Frain | March 1, 2019 |
| 7 | 7 | "If Memory Serves" | Ethan Peck | March 8, 2019 |
| 8 | 8 | "Project Daedalus" | Hannah Cheesman | March 15, 2019 |
| 9 | 9 | "The Red Angel" | Sonequa Martin-Green | March 22, 2019 |
| 10 | 10 | "Perpetual Infinity" | Shazad Latif | March 29, 2019 |
| 11 | 11 | "Through the Valley of Shadows" | Anson Mount | April 5, 2019 |
| 12 | 12 | "Such Sweet Sorrow, Part 1" | Michelle Paradise | April 12, 2019 |
| 13 | 13 | "Such Sweet Sorrow, Part 2" | Sonequa Martin-Green | April 19, 2019 |

=== Picard season 1 (2020) ===
The second season of The Ready Room is an aftershow for the first season of Star Trek: Picard, with Wil Wheaton as host. Episodes were released hours after an episode of Picard, free-to-air on Facebook Live, IGTV, and YouTube as well as on CBS All Access for subscribers. CBS released a bonus episode of The Ready Room discussing the making of the first season of Picard on July 2, 2020, to coincide with the first day of voting for the 72nd Emmy Award nominations. Wil Wheaton returned as host for the special which was filmed remotely due to the COVID-19 pandemic, and referred to as an "Away Mission".

| No. overall | No. in season | Episode(s) discussed | Guests | Original release date |
|---|---|---|---|---|
| 14 | 1 | "Remembrance" | Michael Chabon and Hanelle Culpepper | January 23, 2020 |
| 15 | 2 | "Maps and Legends" | Akiva Goldsman | January 30, 2020 |
| 16 | 3 | "The End Is the Beginning" | Michelle Hurd | February 6, 2020 |
| 17 | 4 | "Absolute Candor" | Santiago Cabrera | February 13, 2020 |
| 18 | 5 | "Stardust City Rag" | Evan Evagora | February 20, 2020 |
| 19 | 6 | "The Impossible Box" | Jeri Ryan and Rod Roddenberry | February 27, 2020 |
| 20 | 7 | "Nepenthe" | Jonathan Frakes and Brent Spiner | March 5, 2020 |
| 21 | 8 | "Broken Pieces" | Jeri Ryan and Jonathan Del Arco | March 12, 2020 |
| 22 | 9 | "Et in Arcadia Ego, Part 1" | Isa Briones | March 19, 2020 |
| 23 | 10 | "Et in Arcadia Ego, Part 2" | Alison Pill and Patrick Stewart | March 26, 2020 |
Bonus Episode
| 24 | 11 | "Away Mission Special" | Patrick Stewart, Christine Clark, and James MacKinnon | July 2, 2020 |

=== Lower Decks season 1 (2020) ===
A special episode of The Ready Room, with Wil Wheaton returning as host, was released following the premiere of Star Trek: Lower Decks. Another aftershow episode was released following the sixth episode, and a virtual panel for the 2020 New York Comic Con was recorded as a third aftershow for the series following its season finale.

| No. overall | No. in season | Title | Guests | Original release date |
|---|---|---|---|---|
| 25 | 1 | "Season 1 Premiere Special" | Mike McMahan and Barry Kelly | August 6, 2020 |
| 26 | 2 | "Season 1 Midseason Special" | Mike McMahan, Tawny Newsome, Jack Quaid, Noël Wells, and Eugene Cordero | September 10, 2020 |
| 27 | 3 | "Season 1 Finale Special" | Mike McMahan, Tawny Newsome, Jack Quaid, Noël Wells, Eugene Cordero, Dawnn Lewis, Jerry O'Connell, Fred Tatasciore, Gillian Vigman, and Jonathan Frakes | October 8, 2020 |

=== Discovery season 3 (2020–21) ===
This season of The Ready Room serves as an aftershow for the third season of Star Trek: Discovery, hosted by Wil Wheaton.

| No. overall | No. in season | Episode(s) discussed | Guests | Original release date |
|---|---|---|---|---|
| 28 | 1 | "That Hope Is You, Part 1" | David Ajala | October 15, 2020 |
| 29 | 2 | "Far from Home" | Doug Jones and Mary Wiseman | October 22, 2020 |
| 30 | 3 | "People of Earth" | Jonathan Frakes, Bo Yeon Kim, Erika Lippoldt, and Jeff Russo | October 29, 2020 |
| 31 | 4 | "Forget Me Not" | Anthony Rapp and Wilson Cruz | November 5, 2020 |
| 32 | 5 | "Die Trying" | Rachael Ancheril and Jason Zimmerman | November 12, 2020 |
| 33 | 6 | "Scavengers" | Neville Page | November 19, 2020 |
| 34 | 7 | "Unification III" | Sonequa Martin-Green | November 26, 2020 |
| 35 | 8 | "The Sanctuary" | Blu del Barrio and Ian Alexander | December 3, 2020 |
| 36 | 9 | "Terra Firma, Part 1" | Emily Coutts, Oyin Oladejo, Patrick Kwok-Choon, Ronnie Rowe Jr., Sara Mitch | December 10, 2020 |
| 37 | 10 | "Terra Firma, Part 2" | Michelle Yeoh | December 17, 2020 |
| 38 | 11 | "Su'Kal" | Doug Jones and Janet Kidder | December 24, 2020 |
| 39 | 12 | "There Is a Tide..." | Jonathan Frakes | December 31, 2020 |
| 40 | 13 | "That Hope Is You, Part 2" | Sonequa Martin-Green, Michelle Paradise, Olatunde Osunsanmi | January 7, 2021 |

=== Lower Decks season 2 (2021) ===
| No. overall | No. in season | Title | Guests | Original release date |
|---|---|---|---|---|
| 41 | 1 | "Season 2 Premiere Special" | Tawny Newsome, Jack Quaid, Noël Wells, Eugene Cordero | August 12, 2021 |
| 42 | 2 | "Season 2 Finale Special" | Mike McMahan, Dawnn Lewis, Fred Tatasciore, Jerry O'Connell, Gillian Vigman | October 14, 2021 |

=== Prodigy season 1 (2021–22) ===
| No. overall | No. in season | Title | Guests | Original release date |
|---|---|---|---|---|
| 43 | 1 | "Season 1 Premiere Special" | Kevin & Dan Hageman and Kate Mulgrew | October 28, 2021 |
| 76 | 2 | "Season 1 Finale Special" | Kate Mulgrew | December 29, 2022 |

=== Discovery season 4 (2021–22) ===
| No. overall | No. in season | Episode(s) discussed | Guests | Original release date |
|---|---|---|---|---|
| 44 | 1 | "Kobayashi Maru" | Sonequa Martin-Green & Kate Mulgrew (the latter discussing Prodigy) | November 18, 2021 |
| 45 | 2 | "Anomaly" | David Ajala | November 29, 2021 |
| 46 | 3 | "Choose to Live" | Ian Alexander & Blu del Barrio | December 2, 2021 |
| 47 | 4 | "All Is Possible" | Mary Wiseman | December 9, 2021 |
| 48 | 5 | "The Examples" | Anthony Rapp | December 16, 2021 |
| 49 | 6 | "Stormy Weather" | Jonathan Frakes | December 23, 2021 |
| 50 | 7 | "...But to Connect" | Doug Jones | December 30, 2021 |
| 51 | 8 | "All In" | Sonequa Martin-Green & David Ajala | February 10, 2022 |
| 52 | 9 | "Rubicon" | Wilson Cruz | February 17, 2022 |
| 53 | 10 | "The Galactic Barrier" | Glenn Hetrick | February 24, 2022 |
| 56 | 11 | "Coming Home" | Sonequa Martin-Green, Michelle Paradise & Olatunde Osunsanmi | March 17, 2022 |

=== Picard season 2 (2022) ===
| No. overall | No. in season | Episode(s) discussed | Guests | Original release date |
|---|---|---|---|---|
| 54 | 1 | "The Star Gazer" | Patrick Stewart | March 3, 2022 |
| 55 | 2 | "Penance" | John de Lancie | March 10, 2022 |
| 57 | 3 | "Watcher" | Lea Thompson | March 24, 2022 |
| 58 | 4 | "Fly Me to the Moon" | Annie Wersching | March 31, 2022 |
| 59 | 5 | "Two of One" | Jonathan Frakes and Brent Spiner | April 7, 2022 |
| 60 | 6 | "Monsters" | Ito Aghayere | April 14, 2022 |
| 61 | 7 | "Mercy" | Jeri Ryan & Santiago Cabrera | April 21, 2022 |
| 62 | 8 | "Hide and Seek" | Michelle Hurd & Evan Evagora | April 28, 2022 |

=== Strange New Worlds season 1 (2022) ===
| No. overall | No. in season | Episode(s) discussed | Guests | Original release date |
|---|---|---|---|---|
| 63 | 1 | "Strange New Worlds" and Picard: "Farewell" | Anson Mount & Akiva Goldsman | May 5, 2022 |
| 64 | 2 | "Children of the Comet" | Celia Rose Gooding and Henry Alonso Myers | May 12, 2022 |
| 65 | 3 | "Ghosts of Illyria" | Rebecca Romijn & Akela Cooper | May 19, 2022 |
| 66 | 4 | "Memento Mori" | Christina Chong and Davy Perez | May 26, 2022 |
| 67 | 5 | "Spock Amok" | Ethan Peck & Gia Sandhu | June 2, 2022 |
| 68 | 6 | "Lift Us Where Suffering Cannot Reach" | Alex Kurtzman | June 9, 2022 |
| 69 | 7 | "The Serene Squall" | Jess Bush | June 16, 2022 |
| 70 | 8 | "The Elysian Kingdom" | Babs Olusanmokun and Melissa Navia | June 23, 2022 |
| 71 | 9 | "All Those Who Wander" | Bruce Horak | June 30, 2022 |
| 72 | 10 | "A Quality of Mercy" | Ethan Peck and Henry Alonso Myers | July 7, 2022 |

=== Lower Decks season 3 (2022) ===
| No. overall | No. in season | Title | Guests | Original release date |
|---|---|---|---|---|
| 73 | 1 | "Season 3 Premiere Special" | Dawnn Lewis and Mike McMahan | August 25, 2022 |
| 74 | 2 | "Season 3 Midseason Special" | Tawny Newsome and Barry J. Kelly | September 22, 2022 |
| 75 | 3 | "Season 3 Finale Special" | Jack Quaid, Noël Wells, Brett Gray and Ella Purnell (the latter two discussing Prodigy) | October 27, 2022 |

=== Picard season 3 (2023) ===
| No. overall | No. in season | Episode(s) discussed | Guests | Original release date |
|---|---|---|---|---|
| 77 | 1 | "The Next Generation" | Patrick Stewart and Gates McFadden, Terry Matalas | February 16, 2023 |
| 78 | 2 | "Disengage" | Ed Speleers | February 23, 2023 |
| 79 | 3 | "Seventeen Seconds" | Jonathan Frakes | March 2, 2023 |
| 80 | 4 | "No Win Scenario" | Todd Stashwick | March 9, 2023 |
| 81 | 5 | "Imposters" | Michael Dorn and Michelle Hurd | March 16, 2023 |
| 82 | 6 | "The Bounty" | LeVar Burton, Mica Burton, and Ashlei Sharpe Chestnut | March 23, 2023 |
| 83 | 7 | "Dominion" | Tim Russ | March 30, 2023 |
| 84 | 8 | "Surrender" | Brent Spiner | April 6, 2023 |
| 85 | 9 | "Võx" | Jonathan Frakes and Elizabeth Dennehy | April 15, 2023 |
| 86 | 10 | "The Last Generation" | Jeri Ryan and Terry Matalas | April 22, 2023 |

=== Strange New Worlds season 2 (2023) ===
| No. overall | No. in season | Episode(s) discussed | Guests | Original release date |
|---|---|---|---|---|
| 87 | 1 | "The Broken Circle" | Ethan Peck | June 15, 2023 |
| 88 | 2 | "Ad Astra per Aspera" | Rebecca Romijn | June 22, 2023 |
| 89 | 3 | "Tomorrow and Tomorrow and Tomorrow" | Paul Wesley | June 29, 2023 |
| 90 | 4 | "Among the Lotus Eaters" | Anson Mount | July 6, 2023 |
| 91 | 5 | "Charades" | Jess Bush | July 13, 2023 |
| 92 | 6 | "Lost in Translation" | Celia Rose Gooding and Carol Kane | July 20, 2023 |
| 93 | 7 | "Those Old Scientists" | Jonathan Frakes, Jack Quaid and Tawny Newsome | July 23, 2023 |
| 94 | 8 | "Under the Cloak of War" | Babs Olusanmokun and Melissa Navia | July 27, 2023 |
| 95 | 9 | "Subspace Rhapsody" | Christina Chong | August 3, 2023 |
| 96 | 10 | "Hegemony" | J. Alan Scott | August 10, 2023 |

=== Lower Decks season 4 (2023) ===
| No. overall | No. in season | Title | Guests | Original release date |
|---|---|---|---|---|
| 97 | 1 | "Season 4 Finale Special" | Dawnn Lewis and Jerry O'Connell | November 2, 2023 |

=== Discovery season 5 (2024) ===
| No. overall | No. in season | Episode(s) discussed | Guests | Original release date |
|---|---|---|---|---|
| 98 | 1 | "Red Directive" and "Under the Twin Moons" | Doug Jones | April 4, 2024 |
| 99 | 2 | "Jinaal" | Wilson Cruz | April 11, 2024 |
| 100 | 3 | "Face the Strange" | Anthony Rapp | April 18, 2024 |
| 101 | 4 | "Mirrors" | Callum Keith Rennie | April 25, 2024 |
| 102 | 5 | "Whistlespeak" | Alex Kurtzman | May 2, 2024 |
| 103 | 6 | "Erigah" | Eve Harlow and Elias Toufexis | May 9, 2024 |
| 104 | 7 | "Labyrinths" | David Ajala | May 16, 2024 |
| 105 | 8 | "Lagrange Point" | Blu del Barrio and Jonathan Frakes | May 23, 2024 |
| 106 | 9 | "Life, Itself" | Sonequa Martin-Green and Michelle Paradise | May 30, 2024 |

=== Lower Decks season 5 (2024) ===
| No. overall | No. in season | Title | Guests | Original release date |
|---|---|---|---|---|
| 107 | 1 | "Season 5 and Series Finale Special" | Tawny Newsome, Jack Quaid, Noël Wells and Eugene Cordero | December 19, 2024 |
