= Cavern (disambiguation) =

A cavern is another name for a cave or a large room within a cave.

Cavern or The Cavern may also refer to:

- The Cavern Club or The Cavern, a rock-and-roll club in Liverpool, England
- The Cavern (2005 film), a 2005 horror film
- The Cavern (1964 film), directed by Edgar G. Ulmer
- Caverns (novel), a 1989 novel written collaboratively as an experiment by Ken Kesey
- "Cavern" (song), a song by Phish
- "Cavern", a song from Liquid Liquid's 1983 EP Optimo
