= Star Trek: Discovery season 1 =

Star Trek: Discovery
- Season 1
- Promotional poster
- Showrunners: Gretchen J. Berg; Aaron Harberts
- Starring: Sonequa Martin-Green; Doug Jones; Shazad Latif; Anthony Rapp; Mary Wiseman; Jason Isaacs
- No. of episodes: 15

Release
- Original network: CBS (premiere); CBS All Access
- Original release: September 24, 2017 – February 11, 2018

Season chronology
- Next → Season 2

The first season of the American television series Star Trek: Discovery is set a decade before Star Trek: The Original Series in the 23rd century and follows the crew of the starship Discovery during the Federation–Klingon war. The season was produced by CBS Television Studios in association with Secret Hideout, Roddenberry Entertainment, and Living Dead Guy Productions, with Gretchen J. Berg and Aaron Harberts serving as showrunners, and Akiva Goldsman providing producing support.

Sonequa Martin-Green stars as Michael Burnham, first officer of the USS Shenzhou and later the Discovery, along with Doug Jones, Shazad Latif, Anthony Rapp, Mary Wiseman, and Jason Isaacs. The series was announced in November 2015, and Bryan Fuller joined as showrunner the next February. He brought on Berg and Harberts to support him, and they took over as showrunners when Fuller left the series in October 2016 following creative disagreements with CBS. The season's war storyline was intended to represent the divide between different political factions of the modern United States, with effort put into redesigning the Klingon species and developing their culture and biology. Filming took place in Toronto, Canada, from January to October 2017, with additional filming on location in Jordan for the series premiere. The crew, including the visual effects team—led by Pixomondo—and composer Jeff Russo, aimed for the series' production values to match that of a feature film. The season features several guest stars taking on roles from The Original Series.

The first episode was broadcast on CBS and released on the streaming service CBS All Access on September 24, 2017. The rest of the 15-episode season was released weekly on All Access in two chapters: the first ended on November 12, and the second was released from January 7 to February 11, 2018. The season led to record subscriptions for All Access, and generally positive reviews from critics who highlighted Martin-Green's performance, the production values, and new additions to Star Trek canon. Some criticized the writing. The season was nominated for two Primetime Creative Arts Emmy Awards and received several other awards and nominations. A second season was ordered in October 2017.

== Episodes ==
No. overall	No. in season	Title	Directed by	Written by	Original release date
Chapter 1
1	1	"The Vulcan Hello"	David Semel	Story by : Bryan Fuller & Alex Kurtzman; Teleplay by : Akiva Goldsman & Bryan Fuller	September 24, 2017 (Note: The first episode had a special premiere on CBS alongside its release on CBS All Access.)
Investigating a damaged satellite near a binary star system on the edge of Federation space, the crew of the Starfleet starship USS Shenzhou discover an object obscured from their sensors. When First Officer Michael Burnham volunteers to investigate the object, she finds an ancient, carved vessel. She is attacked by a Klingon, and when trying to escape, she accidentally kills him. A group of Klingons mourn the death of their soldier, dubbed the "Torchbearer", before an outcast Klingon named Voq volunteers to take his place. The Klingons, led by T'Kuvma, reveal themselves to be in a cloakable ship. T'Kuvma preaches to his followers about the Federation's attempts to usurp the individuality of the Klingons and their culture, and plans to fulfill an ancient prophecy by uniting the 24 great Klingon houses as was once done by the legendary Kahless. Voq activates a beacon that summons all the Klingon leaders. Burnham, desperate to prevent a war, defies the wishes of Captain Philippa Georgiou and attempts to fire on the Klingons first, believing a show of strength will earn their respect. She is arrested for mutiny.
2	2	"Battle at the Binary Stars"	Adam Kane	Story by : Bryan Fuller; Teleplay by : Gretchen J. Berg & Aaron Harberts	September 24, 2017
T'Kuvma convinces the majority of the Klingon leaders that he can lead them to victory over the Federation, as Starfleet reinforcements for the Shenzhou arrive. Georgiou offers to resolve the situation peacefully, but the Klingons immediately open fire and the Shenzhou is critically damaged. Starfleet Admiral Anderson arrives and again offers peace to the Klingons, but his ship is rammed by another cloaked Klingon vessel. Anderson has his ship self-destruct, destroying the Klingon ship. Starfleet retreats, leaving the Klingons to collect their dead. In the remains of the Shenzhou, Burnham escapes from her cell after encouragement from her guardian Sarek via a telepathic connection. She convinces Georgiou to try to take T'Kuvma prisoner, and they create a distraction by sending an explosive into his ship with a Klingon corpse. Boarding the vessel, Burnham overpowers Voq. Georgiou attempts to capture T'Kuvma, but is killed. T'Kuvma is fatally shot by Burnham, who is transported to safety. Voq promises that T'Kuvma's legacy will live on. Burnham is sentenced to life in prison for her mutiny.
3	3	"Context Is for Kings"	Akiva Goldsman	Story by : Bryan Fuller & Gretchen J. Berg & Aaron Harberts; Teleplay by : Gretchen J. Berg & Aaron Harberts & Craig Sweeny	October 1, 2017
Six months into her sentence, Burnham is on an unexpected prison transfer when an emergency forces her shuttle to be rescued by the USS Discovery. Spending several days on the starship, Burnham is ordered by its captain, the mysterious Gabriel Lorca, to assist with a scientific assignment. Burnham overhears Lieutenant Paul Stamets, an astromycologist who is leading the assignment, discuss an upcoming experiment with a colleague serving on another starship; Lorca is soon informed of an incident on the Discovery's sister ship, the USS Glenn, that has killed the entire crew. Stamets leads a boarding party to investigate and finds the dead crew hideously twisted and malformed, as well as a group of Klingons killed by an unknown creature. Lorca later asks Burnham to work for him, despite her sentence, explaining that he organized the circumstances that led her to him so she could help develop a new spore-based propulsion system on Discovery. He believes this "spore drive" could win the war that Burnham started by killing T'Kuvma. He also secretly has the creature transported to the Discovery.
4	4	"The Butcher's Knife Cares Not for the Lamb's Cry"	Olatunde Osunsanmi	Jesse Alexander & Aron Eli Coleite	October 8, 2017
Lorca assigns Burnham to study the creature from the Glenn, which is a giant Tardigrade, to find a way to use its biology as a weapon. Starfleet orders Discovery to the dilithium mining colony Corvan II, which is under Klingon attack. Stamets is reluctant to make such a long jump using the spores, and when the drive is activated the ship nearly collides with a star. Lorca sends Commander Landry to keep Burnham's research on track, and Landry attempts to sedate the Tardigrade (that she names Ripper) to cut off its claw; it kills her. Burnham believes that Ripper was acting in self-defense, and is drawn to the spores. Stamets and Burnham transport it to Engineering, where it connects to the spore drive and interfaces with the navigation system. The ship successfully makes the jump to Corvan II and saves the colony. On T'Kuvma's stranded ship, Klingon leader Kol earns the loyalty of T'Kuvma's desperate followers, and leaves Voq to die in the wreckage of the Shenzhou. L'Rell, a Klingon who is secretly loyal to Voq, promises a way for them to win the war for the house of T'Kuvma.
5	5	"Choose Your Pain"	Lee Rose	Story by : Gretchen J. Berg & Aaron Harberts & Kemp Powers; Teleplay by : Kemp Powers	October 15, 2017
After a month of successful operations, Lorca is ordered to protect the spore drive until it can be replicated for other Starfleet ships. As he returns to the Discovery, Lorca is taken captive by a group of Klingons led by L'Rell. Burnham has grown concerned by the toll that the drive has taken on Ripper. Along with Stamets' partner, medical officer Hugh Culber, Burnham convinces Stamets to find an alternative to run the drive. Lorca is imprisoned with captured Starfleet officer Ash Tyler and human criminal Harry Mudd, and in discussions Lorca reveals that he killed his entire crew during an earlier battle to spare them from the Klingons' torture, but escaped himself. Lorca is tortured by L'Rell, who wants to learn the secret behind Discovery's new form of travel, but Lorca and Tyler escape before the Klingons can learn anything about it. For the final jump needed to escape the Klingons, with Lorca and Tyler onboard, Stamets connects to the spore drive himself, after infusing himself with Ripper's DNA. Later, Burnham frees Ripper while Stamets' reflection in a mirror does not walk away when he does.
6	6	"Lethe"	Douglas Aarniokoski	Joe Menosky & Ted Sullivan	October 22, 2017
On his way to broker a peace deal with renegade Klingon houses, Sarek is injured when a "logic extremist" attempts to assassinate him. Burnham senses this through her telepathic link with Sarek and Lorca agrees to rescue him. Admiral Katrina Cornwell questions this decision and others that Lorca has been making. Burnham searches for Sarek in a shuttle with Tyler and her roommate, Cadet Sylvia Tilly. Burnham attempts to connect with Sarek's mind, and finds him remembering the time that her application for the Vulcan Expeditionary Group was rejected. She learns that the VEG would only admit one of Sarek's children, and he chose Spock, his half-human son. Spock ultimately chose to join Starfleet, rendering Sarek's decision futile. Burnham helps him regain consciousness and activates a locator beacon. Lorca and Cornwell spend a night together, but she is concerned by his paranoid behavior and plans to remove him from command of Discovery. With Sarek unable to meet with the Klingons, Cornwell takes his place; however, the peace talks are actually a trap and she is taken captive.
7	7	"Magic to Make the Sanest Man Go Mad"	David M. Barrett	Aron Eli Coleite & Jesse Alexander	October 29, 2017
While attending a crew party, Burnham and Tyler are called to the bridge to deal with an endangered space creature, a gormagander, that the Discovery has come across. When the creature is brought onboard, it is revealed to be carrying a person: Harry Mudd. He plans to kill Lorca and sell the ship to the Klingons, but when he is caught by the officers he decides to blow up the ship instead. Time returns to the party earlier, with Burnham and Tyler called to the bridge again. They are intercepted by Stamets, who is aware that they are in a time loop due to his interactions with Ripper's DNA. Over numerous time loops, Stamets works with Burnham and Tyler to find a solution to the problem while Mudd gets further in his plan each time. They eventually convince Mudd that he has won, and he ends the time loop. Preparing to receive a boarding party of Klingons, Mudd is instead confronted by his "beloved" Stella and her father, from whom he had stolen her dowry. They take Mudd away. Stamets reveals to Burnham and Tyler that in one of the time loops they had danced together and kissed.
8	8	"Si Vis Pacem, Para Bellum"	John S. Scott	Kirsten Beyer	November 5, 2017
Coming to the aid of another Federation ship, the Discovery is unable to prevent the ship's destruction by a Klingon ship that is using cloaking technology. Desperate for a way to detect these ships even when they are cloaked, Burnham, Tyler, and Saru are sent to Pahvo, a seemingly uninhabited planet with a naturally occurring crystalline transmitter that broadcasts the planet's vibrational frequency into space. They hope to use the transmitter to create a sonar for the hidden Klingon ships. Meanwhile, L'Rell tries to help Cornwell escape in exchange for protection from Kol, but they are caught and L'Rell apparently kills Cornwell to try to save face with Kol. He sentences L'Rell to death for her actions. The Discovery officers learn that Pahvo is inhabited with indigenous life that introduce Saru to their higher understanding of peace, and he attempts to force Burnham and Tyler to remain with him on the planet forever. Burnham is able to fight off Saru and broadcast the new signal. However, the Pahvo lifeforms adjust the signal to contact the Klingons as well, hoping to end the war, and Kol receives the signal.
9	9	"Into the Forest I Go"	Chris Byrne	Bo Yeon Kim & Erika Lippoldt	November 12, 2017
Lorca is ordered to flee before the Klingons arrive, but disobeys in order to protect the lifeforms on Pahvo and improve the Federation's chances of detecting the cloaked ships. When the Klingons arrive, Tyler and Burnham transport to the Klingon ship and plant sensors that will help create an algorithm for detecting cloaked ships. They find an alive Cornwell hidden with L'Rell, but encountering the latter sends Tyler into shock due to memories he has of her torturing and raping him. Lorca has Stamets make 133 micro-jumps with the spore drive in order to provide a three-dimensional reading of the sensors quickly, while Burnham distracts Kol by challenging him to a fight. The jumps are completed, though not without trauma to Stamets. When the algorithm is calculated, Burnham, Tyler, Cornwell, and L'Rell—who wishes to defect—are transported back to the Discovery and the Klingon ship is destroyed. Stamets volunteers to make one more jump to safety, but tells Lorca it will be his last. However, Lorca secretly changes the coordinates and they jump to an unknown destination surrounded by starship debris.
Chapter 2
10	10	"Despite Yourself"	Jonathan Frakes	Sean Cochran	January 7, 2018
Discovery's crew determines that they have arrived in a parallel Mirror Universe, with Stamets now unconscious and unable to power the spore drive. Tyler confronts L'Rell, and she attempts to use a verbal cue to trigger something within him, though he fights this off. They find a data core in the wreckage of a Klingon ship and learn that this universe is ruled by the human Terran Empire, who are fighting a resistance that includes species such as Klingons and Vulcans. Here, Burnham is the former captain of the ISS Shenzhou, presumed dead after an attack by the fugitive Lorca. The ISS Discovery is captained by Sylvia Tilly's counterpart, so Tilly and the crew pretend to be their Mirror selves. They deliver Burnham and Lorca to the Shenzhou, under the ruse that Burnham had been secretly hunting Lorca since her presumed death and has now captured him. Culber informs Tyler that he appears to have undergone major surgical modifications, which triggers something in Tyler and he kills Culber. Tyler joins the others on the Shenzhou, where Lorca is tortured while Burnham assumes command.
11	11	"The Wolf Inside"	T. J. Scott	Lisa Randolph	January 14, 2018
The ISS Shenzhou is given the coordinates of the resistance leadership, and ordered to kill them all. Burnham and Tyler travel as a landing party themselves and instead surrender to the resistance in hopes of learning how the Klingons of this universe have learned to work with other species; they find that the Mirror version of Voq is the resistance leader. Burnham offers to give the group time to escape before their base is destroyed, and Mirror Sarek confirms that she can be trusted after connecting to her mind. Listening to Voq triggers Tyler's programming, and he has to be restrained. Back on the ship, he reveals to Burnham that he now knows he was once Voq, and that he underwent surgery to appear human and infiltrate Starfleet. She has him beamed into space, where he is picked up by the USS Discovery. Saru and Tilly imprison him, having earlier found the body of Culber. They also unsuccessfully attempted to heal Stamets, who has not been the same since his last spore jump and Culber's death. Burnham is reprimanded for not killing the resistance leaders by the Emperor—the Mirror version of Georgiou.
12	12	"Vaulting Ambition"	Hanelle M. Culpepper	Jordon Nardino	January 21, 2018
Burnham and Lorca are summoned to the ISS Charon, the imperial flagship. Georgiou sends Lorca to a torturous agony booth, and has dinner with Burnham. Stamets finds himself within the mycelial network with the consciousness of his Mirror counterpart, learning that the network has been corrupted by the Mirror Stamets' experiments. Stamets encounters a representation of Culber and accepts his loss, before waking up from his trance. He discovers that his spore collection has been infected. Georgiou laments allowing Lorca to become a father figure to Burnham, only for the pair to fall in love and plot to overthrow her. She plans to execute Burnham, who reveals the truth about being from another universe. Explaining how they had crossed over, Georgiou trades the spore drive's schematics for information on alternative ways to cross between universes, which leads Burnham to realize that the Lorca she knows is actually originally from the Mirror Universe and has been manipulating events to get back to the Mirror Universe while also getting close to her. Lorca escapes from the agony booth.
13	13	"What's Past Is Prologue"	Olatunde Osunsanmi	Ted Sullivan	January 28, 2018
Lorca frees his old crew, who have been tortured since his disappearance, and with the help of Mirror Stamets they are able to kill those loyal to Georgiou and usurp her throne. She goes into hiding, while Burnham also evades capture and contacts the Discovery. They agree to a plan in which Burnham lowers the containment field around a large energy source in the ISS Charon that originated from the mycelial network. The Discovery will then arrive to destroy the energy source, causing an explosion which they can ride into the mycelial network through which Stamets could navigate them back to their own universe. Georgiou agrees to help Burnham and they attack Lorca's group. Rejected and defeated by Burnham, Lorca is then killed by Georgiou who offers to sacrifice herself to allow Burnham's escape. The latter instead decides to take Georgiou with her as they are beamed to the Discovery and the Charon is destroyed. Back in their original universe, the Discovery crew learn that they have arrived nine months after they left, and, in the meantime, the Klingons have nearly won the war.
14	14	"The War Without, The War Within"	David Solomon	Lisa Randolph	February 4, 2018
The Discovery is boarded by Cornwell and Sarek, who explain that the Klingon houses remain divided and fight between themselves to see which can destroy more Federation assets. The only safe refuge for Starfleet beyond Earth is now Starbase 1, and they warp there with Cornwell assuming command. After emergency surgery performed by L'Rell, Tyler now has his personality back, but can still access Voq's memories; Burnham is unable to forgive his actions as Voq and rejects him. The crew finds Starbase 1 conquered by a Klingon house, and the remainder of Starfleet's command withdraws to protect Earth. Georgiou tells Burnham that she defeated the Klingons in the Mirror Universe with a surprise attack on their homeworld of Qo'noS, and Cornwell agrees to replicate that now. To jump into Klingon territory, Stamets terraforms a desolate moon to grow a new crop of spores so they can use the spore drive. Georgiou tells Sarek and Cornwell of other essential information she has, and they have her pose as this universe's original Captain Georgiou to lead the mission.
15	15	"Will You Take My Hand?"	Akiva Goldsman	Story by : Akiva Goldsman & Gretchen J. Berg & Aaron Harberts; Teleplay by : Gretchen J. Berg & Aaron Harberts	February 11, 2018
Tyler suggests that a drone enter Qo'noS's underground, dormant volcanic system to covertly search the planet for targets. Discovery jumps to a cave near the system's entrance, and a party of Georgiou, Burnham, Tilly, and Tyler pose as traders visiting an Orion outpost on the planet. Tilly discovers that the volcanic system they are targeting is active, and that the "drone" Georgiou has is a hydro-bomb. Burnham confronts Cornwell, who admits that detonating the bomb in the active volcano will annihilate all life on Qo'noS and win the war for the Federation. Burnham insists that Starfleet not commit genocide, and convinces Georgiou to give up the detonator in exchange for her freedom. They give the detonator to L'Rell, who uses the threat of mass destruction to unite the Klingon houses under her leadership and end the war. The Discovery crew are hailed as heroes, and Burnham is issued a full pardon and restored to the rank of commander. Tyler chooses to remain with L'Rell. As Discovery warps to Vulcan to pick up its new captain, the crew receive a distress call from Captain Pike of the USS Enterprise.

In March 2018, a "secret scene" was released depicting an alternative ending to the season finale, in which Mirror Georgiou is approached by an operative of Section 31. This storyline is further explored in the second season.

== Cast and characters ==
=== Main ===
- Sonequa Martin-Green as Michael Burnham
- Doug Jones as Saru
- Shazad Latif as Voq / Ash Tyler
- Anthony Rapp as Paul Stamets
- Mary Wiseman as Sylvia Tilly
- Jason Isaacs as Gabriel Lorca

=== Recurring ===
- Michelle Yeoh as Philippa Georgiou
- Mary Chieffo as L'Rell
- James Frain as Sarek
- Kenneth Mitchell as Kol
- Jayne Brook as Katrina Cornwell
- Wilson Cruz as Hugh Culber

=== Notable guests ===
- Mia Kirshner as Amanda Grayson
- Rainn Wilson as Harry Mudd
- Katherine Barrell as Stella Mudd
- Clint Howard as an Orion drug dealer

== Production ==
=== Development ===
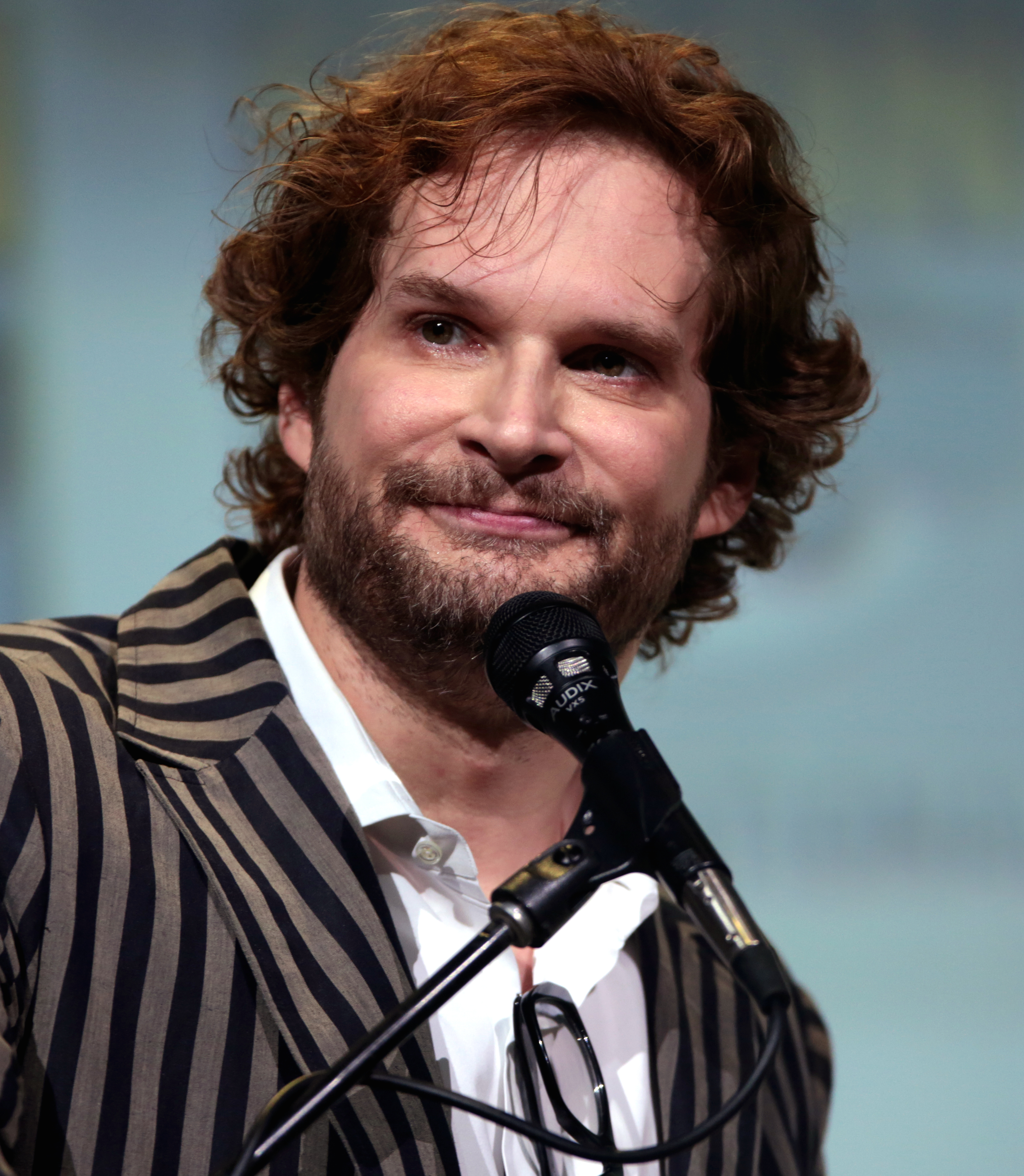
Co-creator Bryan Fuller did initial work as showrunner on Discovery, establishing the story and mythology, before leaving the series due to a difficult relationship with CBS

On November 2, 2015, CBS announced that a new Star Trek television series would premiere in January 2017, "on the heels" of Star Trek: The Original Series' 50th anniversary in 2016. The series would be developed specifically for the streaming service CBS All Access. Bryan Fuller was hired to be showrunner and executive producer in February 2016, as well as co-creator with Alex Kurtzman. Fuller began his career writing for the series Star Trek: Deep Space Nine and Star Trek: Voyager, and had publicly called for Star Trek to return to television for years after the end of the previous series, Star Trek: Enterprise, in 2005. When Fuller first met with CBS about the series, the company did not have a plan for what the show would be. He proposed an anthology series where each season would be a standalone, serialized show set in a different era, beginning with a prequel to the original series. CBS told Fuller to start with a single serialized show and see how that performs first, and so he began further developing the prequel concept. In June, Fuller announced that the first season would consist of 13 episodes, and a month later, at Star Trek's 50th anniversary San Diego Comic-Con panel, he revealed the series' title to be Star Trek: Discovery. He also said it would be set in the "Prime Timeline" alongside the previous Star Trek series, rather than in the alternate "Kelvin Timeline" that the concurrent Star Trek film series was set in.

At the end of July, CBS hired David Semel, a veteran television procedural director who was under an overall deal with the studio, to direct the first episode for Discovery. Fuller did not approve of this decision, believing that Semel was "wrong for the job" and wanting a more visionary director to establish the style of the series. Fuller had personally reached out to Edgar Wright to direct the first episode before CBS hired Semel. As development and pre-production on the series continued, Fuller and Semel "clashed" on the direction of the show. The series was also starting to overrun its per-episode budget. Fuller was attempting to design new sets, costumes, and aliens for the series while heading the series' writers room and also spending considerable time addressing his commitments as showrunner of another new series, American Gods. This caused frustration among CBS executives that were pushing for a January 2017 debut. By August 2016, Fuller had hired Gretchen J. Berg and Aaron Harberts, who he had worked with on his earlier series Pushing Daisies, to serve as co-showrunners with him on Discovery. A month later, Fuller and Kurtzman asked CBS to delay the series' release so they could realistically meet the high expectations for the series, and the studio announced that the series premiere had been pushed back to May 2017. The pair said in a statement that "these extra few months will help us achieve a vision we can all be proud of."

A few weeks after the delay was announced, Fuller met with Sonequa Martin-Green about portraying the series' lead, a character that had been surprisingly difficult for the production to cast. Fuller felt he had "found the crucial piece of the puzzle", but the actress would not be released from her contract at AMC until her character's death on The Walking Dead was publicly revealed. This episode was not set to air until April 2017, meaning Discovery would have to be delayed again if Martin-Green was cast in the series. At the end of October, CBS asked Fuller to step down as showrunner. They announced that the production was being restructured to keep Fuller actively involved with the series, but not on a day-to-day production level as he shifted his focus fully to American Gods: Berg and Harberts were made sole showrunners of Discovery, working off a broad story arc and overall mythology established by Fuller; Kurtzman and Fuller would continue as executive producers, with Fuller still helping the writers break stories; and Akiva Goldsman would join the series as a supporting producer—similar to the role he held on Fringe alongside Kurtzman—to help the showrunners and other producers "juggle the demands of the series". In a statement, CBS reiterated that they were "extremely happy with [Fuller's] creative direction" for the series, and were committed to "seeing this vision through". However, some elements of the series that came directly from Fuller were soon dropped, including some "more heavily allegorical and complex story" points and some of his design plans. Fuller later confirmed that he was no longer involved in the series at all, which he said was "bittersweet ... I can only give them the material I've given them and hope that it is helpful for them." By the end of the year, Martin-Green had indeed been cast as the series' lead, and in May 2017, the episode order was expanded to 15. That June, CBS announced a new premiere date of September 24. The season was divided into two chapters, with an airing break after the ninth episode to allow time for post-production on episodes in the second half of the season to be completed.

=== Writing ===
"One of the driving forces of this war was to not vilify either side. The show is often told from both points of view ... there are significant sections of the narrative that are purely from the Klingon point of view and in Klingon. That allows the audience to participate in the debate of who is right and who is wrong."

— Executive producer Akiva Goldsman on approaching the Federation-Klingon war from both sides.

Fuller wanted to differentiate the series from the previous 700+ episodes of Star Trek by taking advantage of the streaming format of All Access and telling a single story arc across the entire first season. He and the writers had completely planned this arc by the end of June 2016. Fuller said the original series episode "Balance of Terror", one of his favorites, would be a "touchstone" for the season's story direction. In August, Fuller teased that the story arc revolved around "an event in Star Trek history that's been talked about but never been explored", 10 years before the events of the original series. This was later revealed to be the Federation-Klingon cold war. Goldsman explained that this story would be told over the course of the first season and end with the creation of the Neutral Zone, allowing a new story to be told in potential future seasons. He described the events explored by the season as "sufficiently inexact [in previous Star Trek stories] that we can now fill in how we got there." He acknowledged that this time period has been widely covered by previous Star Trek novels, and explained that the series' writers considered these novels to be non-canon.

The writers felt that a traditional series might have begun with the series' protagonist, Michael Burnham, boarding the USS Discovery and then revealed her backstory through flashbacks. For Star Trek: Discovery, they wanted to take a different approach and begin with a prologue that explored Burnham's initial actions and her relationship to Captain Philippa Georgiou. Feeling that at least "two hours" were needed to convey this, the first two episodes of the season (released as a two-part premiere) cover this prologue, with the season's main story beginning with the third episode. The third episode was considered to be the series' equivalent of a pilot episode, and begins six months after the second. This time jump was inspired by film sequels that begin with significant events having transpired since the previous instalment such as Terminator 2: Judgment Day (1991). The third episode reveals that the season's story involves the development of a new form of space travel that could win the war for the Federation. When it was noted that this form of travel is not known in the previous Star Trek series (set later in the timeline), actor Jason Isaacs stated that the writers were aware of this, and were "very clear, in not a cop-out way, to both incorporate this stuff which is exciting and very visual, to make sure that it didn't rankle canon." The season's story is split into two "micro-arcs", covering the first nine episodes and then the rest of the season, with a break in airing between the two. It finishes with the end of the war, which comes down to an agreement between two characters. These negotiations are made entirely by female characters, which was an intentional choice that Kurtzman felt was justified by the Me Too movement. The writers felt this was true to the spirit of Star Trek, and allowed them to move beyond the war storyline that Fuller had established for the show. The second season is then set-up with the appearance of the USS Enterprise from previous Star Trek media. Harberts explained that the writers knew they would have to acknowledge the existence of the Enterprise at some point due to the series' place in the timeline, and after Fuller left they decided to just "tell this story now" with the second season.

Because of the season's focus on Klingons and their culture, the producers decided that members of the species would speak their own language with subtitles throughout the show. Berg said this was "very important for us ... They have their own pride. They have their own interests and talent." Klingons historically represented the Soviet Union, and were portrayed as becoming friendlier with the protagonists of Star Trek as the real Cold War ended. For Discovery, the Klingons and Starfleet are intended to represent different factions within the modern United States, with Harberts explaining that the writers wanted to introduce two different points of view and explore their differences. He said the season is ultimately about "finding a way to come together". Berg added that one of the main themes being explored for the season was the "universal" lesson of "you think you know 'the other,' but you really don't". The showrunners stated that where previous Star Trek series revolved around the relationships between central male characters, Discovery focuses more on female characters. They described a "friendship structure" that goes from Captain Georgiou to First Officer Burnham to Cadet Tilly. They also explained that the two main Starfleet captains in the series, Georgiou and Lorca, are "metaphors for how people and institutions act in times of conflict", with Georgiou responding to war as would be expected of a traditional Starfleet officer, but Lorca representing a more "complicated version of a Starfleet captain who can almost only exist during a time of war".

=== Casting ===
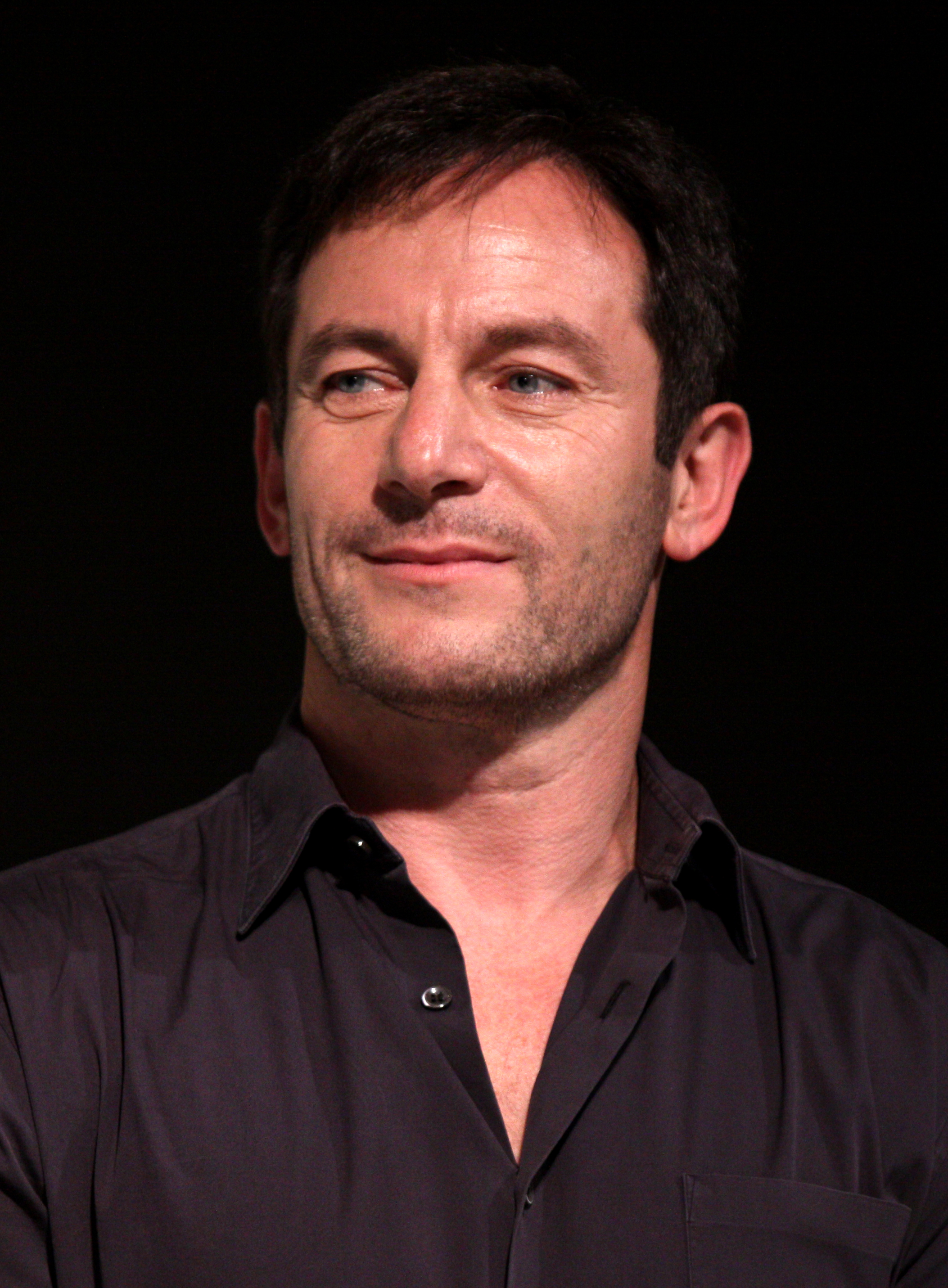
Jason Isaacs joined the cast for this season, portraying Discovery's Captain Gabriel Lorca

In addition to Martin-Green as protagonist Michael Burnham, the season's main cast includes Doug Jones as Saru, an alien lieutenant commander; Shazad Latif as Ash Tyler, a former prisoner of war; Anthony Rapp as Paul Stamets, an astromycologist; Mary Wiseman as Sylvia Tilly, a cadet; and Jason Isaacs as Gabriel Lorca, captain of the USS Discovery. Isaacs was just cast for one season. Not all of the show's characters are introduced in the first episode as would be done in a traditional television series, with the writers taking advantage of the serialized format to take their time introducing each character over several episodes. Tyler is eventually revealed to actually be the Klingon Voq disguised as a human. Voq was initially credited as being portrayed by the actor "Javid Iqbal", who was invented for the ruse to hide the fact that Latif was portraying both Voq and Tyler. The name Javid Iqbal comes from Latif's father.

In November 2016, series' writer and consulting producer Nicholas Meyer mentioned that Michelle Yeoh had been cast in Discovery, and she was soon confirmed to be portraying Captain Georgiou of the USS Shenzhou. A month later, Mary Chieffo was cast as the Klingon L'Rell. In April 2017, Kenneth Mitchell was cast as Kol, who Latif was originally cast as before he was recast as Voq. That July, Rapp revealed that Wilson Cruz, whom Rapp had previously worked with on the musical Rent, would portray Stamets' love interest Hugh Culber. Jayne Brook also has a recurring role in the season, as Admiral Katrina Cornwell. Additionally appearing throughout the season in "co-starring" roles are Emily Coutts as Keyla Detmer, Ali Momen as Kamran Gant, Chris Violette as Britch Weeton, Romain Waite as Troy Januzzi, Sara Mitich as Airiam, Oyin Oladejo as Joann Owosekun, Ronnie Rowe Jr. as R.A. Bryce, Conrad Coates as Terral, and Patrick Kwok-Choon as Rhys. Tasia Valenza and Julianne Grossman provided the computer voices for the Shenzhou and the Discovery, respectively.

Fuller said in August 2016 that the series would eventually include characters from previous Star Trek media, but he wanted to establish its own characters in the first season. He did express interest in including the character Amanda Grayson from The Original Series, saying, "there's much to be told about that". She was later confirmed to be appearing in the season due to Burnham having been adopted by Grayson and her husband Sarek in Discovery's backstory. James Frain was cast as Sarek by January 2017. Rainn Wilson was cast as another original series character, Harry Mudd, that March. In September, Harberts revealed that Mia Kirshner had been cast as Grayson. Katherine Barrell portrays Mudd's wife Stella. Clint Howard, who appeared in several previous Star Trek series, has a role in the season finale as an Orion drug dealer. The role was written specifically for Howard, who is friends with Goldsman.

=== Design ===
==== Sets and starships ====
Mark Worthington and Todd Cherniawsky served as initial production designers for the series, with Tamara Deverell taking over around the sixth episode. She was the first female production designer for the Star Trek franchise. After CBS told the writers to add an excursion to a planet for an upcoming episode, which became the visit to Pahvo, Deverell had 10 minutes to pitch a design for the new sets. She came up with the idea of a yurt consisting of membranes, based on a mathematical structure, which was added to a forest using visual effects. For the second half of the season, Deverell had to redesign the Mirror Universe, a classic location from previous series. Deverell said the previous depictions had "just slapped a logo on the wall" to represent the Mirror Universe's Terran Empire, but for this series her team created a multi-dimensional version of the Terran Empire logo and then augmented sets with new mirrors to further distance them from the Prime Universe sets. For the flagship spaceship of the Terran Empire, the ISS Charon, Deverell used a "monolithic, Brutalist, concrete form" for her designs.

The design of the USS Discovery is based on an unused Ralph McQuarrie design for the USS Enterprise from the unproduced film Star Trek: Planet of the Titans. The USS Shenzhou was designed to look older than the Discovery, and was compared more to a submarine from The Hunt for Red October (1990) than previous Star Trek spaceships. The Shenzhou is a Walker-class starship, a new designation created for the series that is named for test pilot Joe Walker. Sets for the Shenzhou and the Discovery's interiors were built for the series, described as a "tangle of corridors and rooms". Because the bridge of the Shenzhou is on the bottom of that ship, the set for that room was built 12 feet (3.7 m) off the ground and upside down, and became a challenge for the crew to work in. In some cases, such as the transporter rooms and corridors, the same sets were used for both ships. These were dressed differently, with alternate lighting, graphics, and paint. The "turn over" process from depicting on ship to another within a set took up to a week.

==== Costumes ====
Fabric for the Starfleet uniforms seen in the series were custom-dyed in Switzerland; the costumes were cut and assembled in Toronto by costume designer Gersha Phillips and her department. For officers in combat situations or hazardous away missions, jumpsuit-versions of the main uniform were paired with armored vests. Also designed for the series was a Starfleet long haul space suit, which was built in the United Kingdom from sections of high-density foam that were then covered in fiberglass. Phillips designed traditional Vulcan robes for Sarek which were meant to reflect his devotion to logic and "serious intellectual pursuits". Vulcan pendants celebrating "Infinite Diversity in Infinite Combinations" were 3D printed and hand painted. For Harry Mudd's costume, primarily made of leather, Phillips was inspired by Adam Ant.

==== Klingons ====
Fuller had "really, really wanted" to redesign the Klingons, which he felt had inconsistent designs throughout the franchise's history. He wanted to portray the race as "sexy and vital and different" rather than "the thugs of the universe", and spent months working with prosthetics designer Neville Page and production designer Mark Worthington on the new look. Page was aware that changing the look of the Klingons would be controversial with Star Trek fans. The idea was to bring a fresh take to the Klingon race by creating a "high level of sophisticated detail—for a race that had long been perceived as brutal, one-minded, and simplistic".

New skull designs for the Klingon characters seen in the series, created by Neville Page at Alchemy Studios, including accommodations for sensory receptors on top of the skulls

Page first designed a generic, "realistic" Klingon skull, inspired by real biology, and then developed the different Klingons from that base in an evolution-based approach. The skull design includes spaces for "extra sensory receptors" running from the top of the head to the back, as Page wanted to show the Klingons to be apex predators with heightened senses. To not cover these receptors, the Klingons are depicted as being bald in the series, which is a design decision that was mandated by Fuller. It was important to the producers to show diversity within the Klingons, so the series depicts both light and dark skinned members of the species, and features different clothing, weapon, and armor designs for each of the 24 Klingon houses. Glenn Hetrick, co-founder of Alchemy Studios with Page, explained that the Klingon Empire covers many planets beyond the homeworld of Qo'noS and so different subsets of the species would have evolved on those different planets, each with different environments and cultures.

Hetrick and Page created armor and weapons with 3D printing and aluminum casts made from hand carved moulds. Some props, such as helmets, were designed to be augmented with visual effects. Weapons like Klingon ceremonial blades and gun-like disruptors were reimagined versions of previous props from franchise, especially Star Trek: The Next Generation. The overall design for Klingon weapons, helmets, and armor was based on the culture notes created for the species in the original series, which included influences from Middle Eastern, Mongolian, and Byzantine culture. Several motifs recur throughout the designs for the Klingons' weapons and armor, including their skulls and vertebrae, images of Klingons "poised to thrust themselves into the honor of battle", and images of Klingons sacrificing themselves in battle. The latter is similar to the emblem of the Klingon Empire.

Phillips and Suttirat Anne Larlarb created the clothing worn by the Klingon T'Kuvma and his followers, inspired more by "ancient Klingon ways" than the costumes seen previously in Star Trek. T'Kuvma wears a tunic created from three different types of leather and a chest plate made with 3D printed beads, decorated with Swarovski crystals. Costumes for his followers were created with individually stained, painted, modelled, and hand-pressed pieces of leather. Each suit took ten costumers 110 hours to complete. Different colored leather was used to differentiate males and females. A notable set of armor created for the season is the Torchbearer armor, which is worn in a ritual to unite the Klingon houses. It was made from 100 individually 3D printed pieces. When first describing the Torchbearer armor, Fuller referred to baroque and samurai styles. Kol, a member of the house of Kor that appeared in the original series, wears more leather and a different set of armor that is closer to those worn previously by Klingons in the franchise. US$3 million was spent on a "massive" ship set for T'Kuvma's house, known as the "Klingon sarcophagus ship", which was designed to look like an alien cathedral. The outside of the ship is covered in coffins ranging from days old to hundreds of years old. The set was 40 feet (12 m) tall, 100 feet (30 m) long, and 50 feet (15 m) wide, and included multiple levels, mezzanines, and cantilevers. The set also included Klingon text and glyphs inspired by the novel The Final Reflection, which helped develop Klingon culture and language. Other details that were taken from the novel include the strategy game Klin zha and Klingon bloodwine cups. Research was done on how written languages evolve to accurately depict the ancient form of Klingon written on the ship. Instead of physical displays like Starfleet's ships, the sarcophagus ship uses holographic displays created with visual effects.

The Klingon homeworld of Qo'noS is visited in the season finale, though the town depicted is an Orion outpost. The production team attempted to reuse existing sets given any new sets would potentially not be reused. The graveyard chamber from the sarcophagus ship set was turned into an Orion sex cabaret, with other sets including a Klingon drinking tent and street stalls. The Orion elements were inspired by Indian architecture, with fabrics from Morocco and other "far east" countries, as these were the inspirations for the original Orion designs in previous Star Trek series. Deverell described the sets as "lush like a bordello in the 1800s. We were allowed to go crazy."

=== Filming ===
Filming for the season began at Pinewood Toronto Studios on January 24, 2017, with cinematographers including Guillermo Navarro, working on the pilot, and Colin Hoult. Set construction had initially been set to begin within a month of June 2016, for a filming period of that September to around March 2017, but by that September, production was not expected to begin until November. After Fuller stepped down as showrunner, set construction was expected to be completed by the end of 2016, with filming to begin "shortly thereafter". By mid-May 2017, filming for scenes set on an unidentified planet had taken place on location in Jordan. Some of the series' sets took over six weeks to create, and new sets were being built up until the end of production on the season. Some episodes for the season were restricted to a few existing sets, making them bottle episodes, though Harberts said the series would not do anything "as bottle-y as 'everyone is stuck in the mess hall!'" Additional location shooting took place around Ontario, Canada, including at the Aga Khan Museum in Toronto which stood in for the Vulcan Science Academy, and in the Hilton Falls and Kelso Conservation Areas for the forest planet Pahvo. Filming for the season concluded on October 11, 2017.

For the visual scope of the series, Kurtzman felt that the show had to "justify being on a premium cable service". The showrunners were particularly inspired by Star Trek: The Motion Picture and its "wider scope", with Harberts explaining that the first season was shot in a 2:1 aspect ratio which "just lends itself to a very lyrical way of telling the story." He added that some of the series' visuals were influenced by the modern Star Trek films from J. J. Abrams. Some of these influences, per Goldsman, are "the ability to be creative cinematically...the intimate discourse, the humanistic storytelling with the giant canvas that is Star Trek. A more kinetic camera, a more dynamic way of existing". The producers worked closely with pilot director David Semel to make the series look as cinematic as possible, including filming the bridge of Starfleet's ships in such a way as "not to shoot in a sort of proscenium box...to be able to get the camera into spaces where, you know, to shoot it in interesting ways, which is a combination of choreographing a scene to motivate the camera moving, and also lighting." The cinematographers wanted to emphasize on-set sourcing, with lighting built in wherever it would naturally appear to help create a more realistic feel, and distance the series from the "stage" feel of The Original Series.

Robyn Stewart, an expert in the Klingon language, and linguist Rea Nolan worked closely with the Klingon actors to ensure they could both speak and understand their lines in the language, having the actors practice while their makeup and prosthetics were being applied, which took three hours each day. They would first rehearse their lines in English, and worked to "inhabit [the lines] emotionally". Chieffo felt that "it makes sense that when we are speaking to each other we are speaking in our native tongue and really adding a fluidity and nuance", while Mitchell said, "It's an incredibly complex language ... it feels alien. Because it is incredibly difficult and I don't speak the language it takes a lot of muscle memory to memorize each separate syllable over and over and over." For a sequence where L'Rell and Tyler are shown having sex, Chieffo required full-body prosthetics which took four hours to apply. Though these are only seen for around 30 seconds in the episode, Chieffo felt strongly that she film the scene rather than a body double.

=== Visual effects ===
The season has 5000 visual effects shots, which visual effects supervisor Jason Zimmerman said was similar to one feature-length film. He said the department was aiming for "high-end" effects, similar to those seen in films, and the number of visual effects in each episode was always driven by the story. Pixomondo was the primary visual effects vendor, with Spin VFX and Crafty Apes also working on the show. The shot that went through the most iterations during the season was a simple composite of computer screen graphics onto an on-set monitor, with 146 different iterations of the graphics tried before the final design was chosen.

=== Music ===
Composer Jeff Russo wrote several themes for the series, in addition to the main title theme, but not necessarily for the different characters in the show as would often be done. Instead, Russo wanted to focus on the emotions of the characters over the story beats, for instance, "Even when you are shooting, you're still feeling, so why not play that as opposed to 'Oh my god, he's got a gun'". Like the rest of the series' departments, Russo's aim was to make the score feel as cinematic as possible.

For the Kasseelian Opera that Stamets talks about later in the season, Russo did not want to attempt to make a "futuristic opera", believing instead that "opera is opera" and that it should have the same style as what is heard during the present day. For the seventh episode, source music from Wyclef Jean is used which Russo compared to people in the current day listening to the music of Johann Sebastian Bach. Singer Ayana Haviv recorded arias for the opera, and in a "moment of inspiration" Russo asked her to sing the vocal section of the original Star Trek theme. Russo and Kurtzman responded positively to her rendition, and Russo arranged the theme for the series' 74-piece orchestra to play over the end credits of the season finale after the USS Enterprise appears. Haviv altered her voice for the final recording to match the original 1960s style of the theme.

A soundtrack album for the first chapter of the season was released digitally on December 15, 2017, by Lakeshore Records. Another, for the second chapter, was released digitally on April 6, 2018. CD versions of both albums were set for release in 2018, along with a vinyl release combining selections from both chapters and titled "Intergalactic Starburst" Vinyl. All music composed by Jeff Russo:

Original Series Soundtrack: Season 1, Chapter 1
No.	Title	Length
1.	"Main Title (Aired Version)"	1:33
2.	"We Come in Peace"	1:22
3.	"First Officer's Log"	1:09
4.	"I'll Go"	7:59
5.	"The Day is Saved"	3:10
6.	"Torchbearer"	1:56
7.	"Ptsd"	2:36
8.	"Persistence"	1:04
9.	"Stranded"	4:12
10.	"What Did You Mean by That?"	1:05
11.	"I Can't Dance"	1:53
12.	"Captain Mudd"	2:46
13.	"Stella"	2:05
14.	"Facing Off"	4:50
15.	"Undetermined"	1:51
16.	"Watch the Stars Fall"	1:59
17.	"Weakened Shields"	4:20
18.	"What's Happening?"	1:00
19.	"Personal Log"	1:38
20.	"The Charge of Mutiny"	2:08
21.	"Main Title (Extended)"	2:10
Total length:		52:00

Original Series Soundtrack: Season 1, Chapter 2
No.	Title	Length
1.	"Burnham Take Over"	1:31
2.	"I Can't Rest Here"	1:22
3.	"Dishonor Yourselves"	2:20
4.	"Tell Me the Truth"	6:29
5.	"The Rebels Haven't Completed Their Evacuation"	1:50
6.	"I'll Take It from Here"	2:09
7.	"Kasseelian Opera"	2:31
8.	"The Lorca I Knew"	2:38
9.	"212 Days of Torture"	1:27
10.	"Biotoxins"	1:58
11.	"Come in Discovery"	2:30
12.	"Safe to Drop Out of Warp"	4:26
13.	"Lorca is Finished"	2:26
14.	"Coming Home"	1:21
15.	"Initiating"	3:02
16.	"Qo'nos Bar Source"	2:54
17.	"Not a Lot of Humans Here"	1:57
18.	"I'm No Good"	2:36
19.	"War is Over"	4:48
20.	"I've Never Been to Vulcan"	0:55
21.	"Incoming Transmission"	1:12
22.	"Theme from Star Trek (Discovery Episode 115 End Credits Version)"	1:02
Total length:		49:00

== Marketing ==
With the announcement of the series' title in July 2016 came a promotional video giving a first look at the USS Discovery. The video did not feature final designs, as the producers had put it together in three weeks to show the concepts for the series to fans. In January 2017, a YouTube video presented by Alcatel was released, using 360° technology to showcase digital models of previous Star Trek ships. The first full trailer for the series was released in May 2017. Chris Harnick of E! News said the trailer was gorgeous and cinematic, and added, because of the appearances of both Sarek and the Klingons, that "this is the Star Trek you know and love." Aja Romano at Vox called the trailer's visuals "sumptuous [and] modern, but still very much in keeping with the aesthetic of previous Trek series". She did note that the series' plot was not conveyed in the trailer.

In July 2017, Discovery had an extensive presence at San Diego Comic-Con, including a panel featuring Martin-Green, Isaacs, Jones, Latif, Wiseman, Rapp, Frain, Kurtzman, Berg, Kadin, Harberts, and Goldsman, and moderated by Wilson. Footage from the series was screened at the panel, with a new trailer released online soon afterwards. CBS also created an immersive art experience at the Michael J. Wolf Fine Arts Gallery, featuring the USS Discovery's captain's chair and other props, costumes, and sketches from the series, as well as limited edition posters and a shop selling Comic-Con-exclusive items. Pedicabs inspired by the series gave free rides through the Gaslamp District, while a "#TrekDiscovery Challenge" competition saw fans have to take pictures with "authentically costumed Trek ambassadors", one each representing the crews of the five previous Star Trek series, as well as the captain's chair at the art gallery, and post them online with the hashtag #TrekDiscovery to be eligible to win a Roku streaming stick and a subscription to CBS All Access. At the convention, Gentle Giant Studios revealed that they had gained the license to create mini-busts and statues based on the series, and planned to particularly focus on the series' Klingons. At the beginning of August, an afternoon of four panels at the Star Trek Las Vegas event was dedicated to the series, featuring producers and writers, actors who were not present at Comic-Con, creature designers, and writers involved with related books and comics.

By the beginning of September, promotion was taking place around the world: Isaacs was involved in the Blackpool Illuminations festival in the UK; cast and crew promoted the series at the Fan Expo Canada; a USS Shenzhou-themed photobooth, that took pictures of fans as Klingons, was in operation at the IFA consumer electronics trade show in Berlin; and an outdoor campaign of posters and billboards was underway, including a large billboard on the roof of an LAX Airport building. The night before the premiere, a model of the USS Discovery was flown above the Hudson River on Manhattan's west side. Created by Remarkable Media, the 50 feet (15 m) skeleton rig was covered in LEDs and suspended from a Black Hawk helicopter. On October 7, panels for the series were held at both the PaleyFest television festival and at New York Comic Con.

== Release ==
=== Broadcast and streaming ===
Star Trek: Discovery premiered at the ArcLight Hollywood on September 19, 2017. The first episode aired in a "preview broadcast" on CBS in the United States on September 24, and was made available for free on CBS All Access along with the second episode (which required an All Access subscription). Subsequent first-run episodes, making up the first chapter of the season, were streamed weekly on All Access through November 5. The second chapter streamed from January 7 to February 11, 2018.

CBS Studios International licensed the series to Bell Media for broadcast in Canada, and to Netflix for another 188 countries. In Canada, the premiere was broadcast on September 24, 2017, on both the CTV Television Network and on the specialty channels Space (English) and Z (French) before being streamed on CraveTV, with subsequent episodes just broadcast on Space and Z before streaming on CraveTV. In the other countries, Netflix released each episode of the series for streaming within 24 hours of its U.S. debut. This agreement with CBS also saw Bell and Netflix acquire all previous Star Trek series to stream in their entirety.

In August 2020, CBS announced that it would be broadcasting the full first season of Discovery beginning on September 24, 2020, alongside other older or acquired series, due to the lack of television content available to the network due to the COVID-19 pandemic. Also in September, ViacomCBS announced that CBS All Access would be expanded and rebranded as Paramount+ in March 2021. Existing episodes of the season remained on Paramount+ along with future seasons of the series. In November 2021, ViacomCBS announced that it had bought back the international streaming rights to Discovery from Netflix effective immediately. In August 2023, Star Trek content was removed from Crave and the season began streaming on Paramount+ in Canada. It would continue to be broadcast on CTV Sci-Fi and be available on CTV.ca and the CTV app.

=== Broadcast breach ===
After reviewing the episode "Choose Your Pain", Space chose to air it uncensored despite its use of the word "fuck" and depictions of violence. The Canadian Broadcast Standards Council received an official complaint about this given the channel aired the episode before 9 pm, since series intended for adult audiences should be shown after that time according to the Canadian Association of Broadcasters' Code of Ethics and Violence Code. The complainant, the council, and Space itself acknowledged that the use of the word was unexpected given the franchise's "51 year track record of being fairly clean with regards to its content." The Council found Space to have breached the regulations in not censoring the episode or scheduling it post-watershed, and required the channel to air an announcement stating as such twice during the week following April 19, 2018. At the time, Bell Media accepted the decision and agreed to comply with the ruling, but did not indicate any intention to change their approach to broadcasting future seasons of the series.

=== Home media ===
The season was released on DVD and Blu-Ray formats in the U.S. on November 13, 2018. The release included two hours of bonus features, including deleted and extended scenes, and behind-the-scenes featurettes. On November 2, 2021, a home media box set collecting the first three seasons of Discovery was released, with more than eight hours of special features including behind-the-scenes featurettes, deleted and extended scenes, audio commentaries, and gag reels.

== Reception ==
=== Ratings and viewership ===
According to Nielsen Media Research, the CBS broadcast of the first episode was watched by a "decent" audience of 9.5 million viewers. The premiere of the series led to record subscriptions for All Access, with the service attributing its biggest day, week, and month of signups to the debut of Star Trek: Discovery. According to "app analytics specialist" App Annie, the premiere of the series caused the number of downloads of the All Access mobile app to more than double. Following a 7-day trial period for new subscribers, revenue from the app for CBS doubled on October 1 compared to the average in-app revenue during the previous 30 days.

=== Critical response ===
Star Trek: Discovery season 1: Critical reception by episode
Season 1 (2017–2018): Percentage of positive critics' reviews tracked by the website Rotten Tomatoes

The review aggregator website Rotten Tomatoes reported an 83% approval rating for the first season, with an average rating of 7.05/10 based on 374 reviews. The website's critical consensus reads, "Although it takes an episode to achieve liftoff, Star Trek: Discovery delivers a solid franchise instalment for the next generation—boldly led by the charismatic Sonequa Martin-Green." The average rating for each of the season's individual episodes is 89%. Metacritic, which uses a weighted average, assigned a score of 72 out of 100 based on reviews from 20 critics, indicating "generally favorable" reviews.

Matt Zoller Seitz of Vulture praised the series' premiere, feeling it "stands tall alongside the best-regarded incarnations of the Trek franchise... with an almost entirely new slate of characters... and casts them with actors you can't help but like". Writing for Vox, Emily VanDerWerff noted "the best thing about Discovery is that Michael Burnham, played beautifully by Martin-Green, does stuff. She gets in trouble. She breaks rules. She violates Starfleet protocol. She has emotions that get the best of her, even as she knows they shouldn't. She is, in other words, very human". Overall, she declared that "Star Trek is best when it's hopeful, but hope shines brightest amid horror. On some level, Discovery knows both of those things". Writing for TVLine, Dave Nemetz graded the premiere episode a B+, saying, "The nail-bitingly tense premiere delivered a cracking good action story, eye-popping special effects and a number of gasp-worthy twists" that was worth the wait. Maureen Ryan of Variety, after watching the first two episodes, said the series "has yet to prove itself a worthy successor to The Next Generation or Deep Space Nine. But there are reasons to hope that Discovery will be a promising addition to the Trek canon".

Chaim Gartenberg for The Verge criticized the "extended prologue" approach, but called the two-part premiere "surprisingly satisfying". He praised Burnham as a "far more rounded, human character than any of the previous captains, with some serious trauma from a Klingon attack in her youth that's left her predisposed to hate the warrior race. And while Star Trek has plumbed the 'main character has demons' well in the past—most notably with Sisko in Deep Space Nine, and Picard in the later films, when it comes to the Borg—Burnham feels far more compelling for not being a flawless human being in other respects, as her series-protagonist predecessors were." Writing for Entertainment Weekly, Darren Franich gave the two-part premiere a B grade, praising Martin-Green's performance as the lead and the production design as well as commenting on the "undeniable appeal" of the "introduction of a new ship, the revelation that we're watching that ship's final voyage, the cliffhanger possibility that our new hero is a fallen angel." However, he felt that the series' third episode retroactively made the two episode prologue "feel even more overextended". Patrick Cooley of cleveland.com criticized the dialogue and "wooden, bewilderingly stupid" characters in the first two episodes. Brian Lowry from CNN called the first three episodes "Star Trek Lite", criticizing the bridge crew and lore, and describing the series as an "unspectacular addition" to the franchise that was mostly designed "to entice new subscribers to CBS All Access."

Discussing the season as a whole, Seitz praised it as the strongest first season of any Star Trek series since the original and defended it against fan criticisms, believing that most complaints about the series could be applied to all Star Trek series or were about intentional differences from those prior series that Seitz saw as "honorable attempts" to modernize the franchise "while still keeping the whole thing recognizably Trek." Seitz in particularly praised the more serialized storytelling, visual effects, original characters like Burnham and Saru, existing characters like Frain's Sarek and Wilson's Harry Mudd, and the themes of science vs. war that the series explored. On the latter, Seitz felt Discovery improved on the efforts of the J. J. Abrams Star Trek films. Discussing the "hits" and "misses" of the season, Witney Seibold of IGN praised the characters, effects, and design as "hits", but criticized as "misses" the tone and storytelling for respectively being too busy and having too many subplots. Gartenberg criticized the writers for over-using science fiction tropes, repeating plot elements, inconsistently portraying characters' attitudes, and for being unsubtle with the values of Starfleet in the finale. He was optimistic for further seasons though, feeling that the end of the season left "the entire slate of the show ... wiped clean for whatever comes next." At Mashable, Chris Taylor felt the Klingons' prosthetics made it difficult to see the actors' emotions, the development of the characters Tyler and Lorca was wasted, the rest of the bridge characters were not explored enough, and the ending of the Klingon war storyline was rushed in the season finale before the Enterprise reveal "left us on the oldest, safest, most recognizable piece of Trek fan service ever."

=== Audience response ===
Matt Zoller Seitz remarked that Star Trek: Discovery "was first met with a mix of generosity and skepticism" from audiences and that the latter came to predominate as audiences got further into the first season.

=== Accolades ===
Netflix listed Star Trek: Discovery fourth in its list of series most watched together by families in 2017. Martin-Green was named TVLine's Performer of the Week for her performance in "The Wolf Inside", in which Burnham is "put through the emotional wringer with a barrage of jaw-dropping twists, giving Martin-Green an opportunity to deliver her finest performance of the season." In January 2019, Comic Book Resources rated Discovery's first season as the ninth best season of all Star Trek series so far, comparing its high production values to a feature film and calling Michael Burnham "the most interesting character Trek has provided us in generations".

Year	Award	Category	Recipient	Result	Ref.
2018	Costume Designers Guild Awards	Excellence in Sci-Fi / Fantasy Television	Gersha Phillips	Nominated	
2018	Dragon Awards	Best Science Fiction or Fantasy TV Series	Star Trek: Discovery	Nominated	
2018	Empire Awards	Best TV Actor	Jason Isaacs	Won	
2018	GLAAD Media Awards	Outstanding Drama Series	Star Trek: Discovery	Nominated	
2018	Hugo Awards	Best Dramatic Presentation	"Magic to Make the Sanest Man Go Mad"	Nominated	
2018	ICG Publicists Awards	Maxwell Weinberg Publicist Showmanship Television Award	Kristen Hall	Nominated	
2018	Peabody Awards	Entertainment	Star Trek: Discovery	Nominated	
2018	Primetime Creative Arts Emmy Awards	Outstanding Prosthetic Makeup for a Series, Limited Series, Movie or Special	"Will You Take My Hand?"	Nominated	
2018	Primetime Creative Arts Emmy Awards	Outstanding Sound Editing for a Comedy or Drama Series (One-Hour)	"What's Past Is Prologue"	Nominated	
2018	Saturn Awards	Best Actor on a Television Series	Jason Isaacs	Nominated	
2018	Saturn Awards	Best Actress on a Television Series	Sonequa Martin-Green	Won	
2018	Saturn Awards	Best Supporting Actor on a Television Series	Doug Jones	Nominated	
2018	Saturn Awards	Best Guest-Starring Performance on Television	Michelle Yeoh	Nominated	
2018	Saturn Awards	Best New Media Television Series	Star Trek: Discovery	Won	
2018	Visual Effects Society Awards	Outstanding Visual Effects in a Photoreal Episode	"The Vulcan Hello"	Nominated	
2018	Visual Effects Society Awards	Outstanding Compositing in a Photoreal Episode	Star Trek: Discovery	Nominated	
