= Matt Mira =

American comedian and podcaster

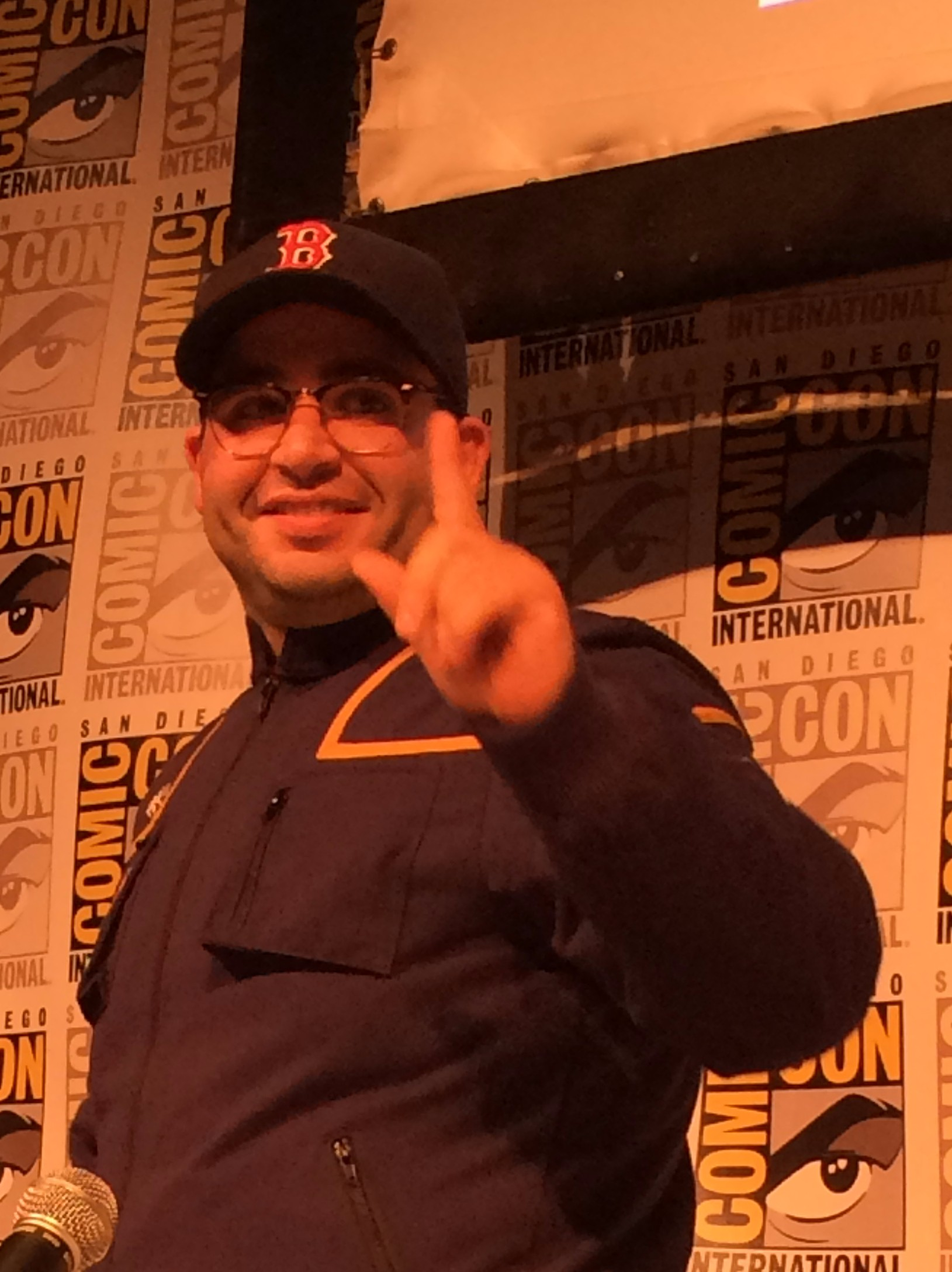
- Mira in July 2015, San Diego Comic-Con
- Born: Matthew Paul Mira; August 5, 1983 (age 43); Stoneham, Massachusetts, U.S.
- Notable work: Co-host of The Nerdist Podcast, co-host of FEaB, correspondent for "Gadget Pr0n" on G4s Attack of the Show, writer for @midnight, writer for The Goldbergs, host of After Trek
- Spouse: Doree Shafrir (m. 2015)
- Children: 1

Comedy career
- Years active: 2008–2017
- Medium: Stand-up, podcasting
- Website: https://www.nerdist.com/

Matthew Paul Mira (born August 5, 1983) is an American podcast host, stand-up comedian and television writer based in Los Angeles. He was a co-host of The Nerdist Podcast from 2010 to 2018.

== Life and career ==
Mira was born in Stoneham, Massachusetts, on August 5, 1983, and grew up in Lowell, Massachusetts. He is the youngest of four children. His parents are John and Mary Mira. He has two older sisters, Kimberly and Julie, and an older brother John. He was raised Catholic, and attended Lowell Catholic High School. After high school he attended local colleges. He left Massachusetts for Los Angeles in 2007 to pursue a career in comedy.

From 2008 to 2010, while working as an Apple Genius, Mira produced the podcast Comedy and Everything Else featuring Todd Glass and Jimmy Dore. Since February 2010, Mira has co-hosted The Nerdist Podcast, with Jonah Ray and Chris Hardwick. The podcast was named one of 2010's best by The A.V. Club. Mira has appeared as a guest on several other podcasts, including Sklarbro Country and Doug Loves Movies. In 2011 Mira produced ONESTAR, a show at UCB Theatre Los Angeles with comedian Thomas Lennon in which comedians and actors performed "dramatic readings of the Yelp reviews of the Koreatown 24 Hour Fitness." Mira hosts a weekly open mic at the NerdMelt theatre at Meltdown Comics in Los Angeles titled Nerdist Open Mic, formerly titled Matt Mira's Day Off. In May 2011, BBC America commissioned a pilot based on The Nerdist Podcast, hosted by its creator, comedian Chris Hardwick and featuring Jonah Ray and Mira in their usual co-hosting roles. Mira announced on The Nerdist Podcast that he had accepted a job as the new gadget producer on G4's Attack of the Show. In January 2012, he began making on-air appearances for the segment. Beginning in July 2012, Mira co-hosted Attack of the Show up until its final episode on January 23, 2013.

A video featuring a golf-cart running over Mira has been featured on the TV shows tosh.0, Country Fried Home Videos, and World's Dumbest....

Beginning in March 2012, Mira began co-hosting an occasional podcast with film producer Scott Mosier called FEaB (Four Eyes and Beard), a joint production of Nerdist Industries and SModcast.com.

Since September 2013, Mira co-hosts James Bonding with Matt Gourley (and guests), an Earwolf podcast where they discuss James Bond films.

Since October 2013, Mira has been writing for the Chris Hardwick hosted @midnight on Comedy Central.

On June 19, 2015, Kevin Smith announced via Facebook that he and Mira "will provide a commentary track for every single episode of Frasier" on a new podcast entitled Talk Salad & Scrambled Eggs.

As of 2016, Mira is writing for The Goldbergs on ABC. He hosts a podcast with his wife Doree Shafrir about their journey about making a baby via IVF called Matt & Doree's Eggcelent Adventure.

In January 2017, Mira began co-hosting the podcast Star Trek: The Next Conversation with fellow The Goldbergs writer Andrew Secunda.

On September 22, 2017, Mira was named host of After Trek, a live after-show companion to Star Trek: Discovery broadcast on CBS All Access.

== Filmography ==
=== Television ===
Year	Title	Role	Notes
2011–2013	Attack of the Show!	Himself – Gadget Pr0n / Himself – Host / Segment Producer	65 episodes
2013	The Nerdist	Himself (Host) / Senior Segment Producer / Head Writer	18 episodes
2013–2015	@midnight	Writer	26 episodes
2016	The Goldbergs	Writer	7 episodes
2017	After Trek	Host	14 episodes
