= The Cavern (2005 film) =

- DVD cover
- Directed by: Olatunde Osunsanmi
- Written by: Olatunde Osunsanmi; Terry Lee Robbins
- Story by: Olatunde Osunsanmi
- Produced by: Terry Lee Robbins; Ioana A. Miller; Gerald A. Vitatoe
- Starring: Sybil Temtchine; Mustafa Shakir
- Edited by: Olatunde Osunsanmi
- Music by: Bryan Galvez; Chakra
- Distributed by: Sony Pictures Home Entertainment
- Release date: October 30, 2005
- Running time: 95 minutes
- Country: United States
- Language: English

The Cavern (originally released as WIthIN) is a 2005 horror film directed by Olatunde Osunsanmi.

== Plot ==
The film is set in the Kyzylkum Desert, Kazakhstan. The opening scenes of the movie sets up the various alliances and tensions between a group of cavers. Five of them - Bailey, Gannon, Domingo, Miranda, and Ori - are part of a team who have caved together for a number of years, making their living from exploring and photographing new caves and reporting back to the world what they find there. Also involved in this trip are two Kazakh natives, Vlad and Slava, who the band have hired as guides, and Ambrose, who is researching for a book on caving.

Rachel, a member of the team who died on an expedition in Peru two years prior, has her story told in flashback as the movie goes on. The men are killed one by one by a mysterious creature, and just as the two women find the escape route, they are captured. They awaken in the beast's lair naked and wrapped in animal skin blankets where they find photos, belongings and an airplane wing in the surrounding area. After searching further, the two find water, then food, and, while eating, discover that the meat is one of their dead friends. The beast enters, and we discover he was the only survivor of a plane crash, a Russian boy called Peter. He proceeds to brutally kill one and rape the other.

== Cast ==
- Sybil Temtchine as Bailey
- Mustafa Shakir as Gannon
- Ogy Durham as Miranda
- Andrew Caple-Shaw as Ori
- Danny A. Jacobs as Ambrose
- Andres Saenz-Hudson as Domingo
- Johnnie Colter as Peter Human
- Neno Pervan as Slava
- Kamen Gabriel as Vlad
- Cassandra Duarden as Rachel
- True Tamplin as Young Peter

== Reception ==
Allmovie gave the film a mostly negative review, calling it "a dime-store copycat cave-horror flick that would be entirely forgettable if not for its shocking finale."
