= Olatunde Osunsanmi =

American film and television director

- Born: October 23, 1977 (age 48); United States
- Occupations: Film and television director, producer
- Years active: 2000–present

Olatunde Osunsanmi (born October 23, 1977) is an American film and television director and producer. He is known for his work on Universal's horror film The Fourth Kind and for the TNT dystopian drama Falling Skies, as well as being director or producer on several episodes of Star Trek: Discovery.

== Life and career ==
Osunsanmi was born in the United States to parents who had immigrated from Nigeria. He graduated with a Masters of Fine Arts degree from Chapman University's Dodge College of Film and Media Arts. His first foray in the industry was with a short film he wrote and directed, entitled Etat. The feature explored the 1970s political climate of his parents' native Nigeria.

He went on to direct and co-pen the low-budget horror film The Cavern, before being approached by Universal Studios to direct, produce and write the alien-invasion/horror film The Fourth Kind. The film claims to be based on "actual case studies" occurring in Nome, Alaska in 2000, and included in the film is footage of Osunsanmi interviewing a "Dr. Abigail Tyler" at Chapman University in Orange, California. In 2013, he directed the serial killer film Evidence, starring True Blood's Stephen Moyer.

He has since switched to directing episodic television, such as instalments of Under the Dome, The Last Ship, Extant, Sleepy Hollow, Minority Report, Gotham, Blindspot and Star Trek: Discovery.

In 2022, Osunsanmi signed a multi-year overall deal with CBS Studios.

=== Falling Skies ===
In summer 2014, Osunsanmi directed his first hour of television with TNT's fourth season drama Falling Skies, entitled "Saturday Night Massacre". He was originally hired for only one episode, but another director was forced to depart episode 4.11, "Space Oddity", due to personal matters, and the cast and crew lobbied for Osunsanmi to return, and he did. He replaced outgoing director/co-executive producer Greg Beeman for the series' fifth and final season. He directed the final season premiere, "Find Your Warrior"; as well as episodes "Hunger Pains" and "Non-Essential Personnel". He lastly directed the series' final episode, "Reborn".

=== Gotham ===
Osunsanmi is credited for directing Season 3, Episode 13 of the TV series, Gotham, titled "Mad City: Smile Like You Mean It". The episode aired on January 23, 2017.

=== Star Trek ===
Osunsanmi directed episode 4 (titled "The Butcher's Knife Cares Not for the Lamb's Cry", aired October 8, 2017), episode 13 (titled "What's Past Is Prologue"; aired January 28, 2018), episode 18 (titled "Point of Light"; aired January 31, 2019), episode 23 (titled "Such Sweet Sorrow"; aired April 11, 2019), episode 30 (titled "That Hope Is You, Part 1"; aired October 15, 2020) and episode 31 (titled "Far From Home"; aired October 22, 2020) of the TV series, Star Trek: Discovery.

He also directed the Star Trek: Short Treks episode "Calypso" (a Star Trek: Discovery inter-season short film) and the television film Star Trek: Section 31 (2025).

== Filmography ==
Direct-to-video

Year	Title	Director	Writer
2005	The Cavern	Yes	Yes
2010	Smokin' Aces 2: Assassins' Ball	No	Yes

Feature film

Year	Title	Director	Writer
2009	The Fourth Kind	Yes	Yes
2013	Evidence	Yes	No
2025	Star Trek: Section 31	Yes	No
TBA	Dark Moon †	Yes	Yes

Television

Year	Title	Director	Executive Producer	Notes
2014–15	Falling Skies	Yes	No	6 episodes
2015	Under the Dome	Yes	No	Episode "Redux"
2015	Extant	Yes	No	Episode "Arms and the Humanich"
2015	The Last Ship	Yes	No	Episode "Valkyrie"
2015	Minority Report	Yes	No	Episode "Fredi"
2015–16	Sleepy Hollow	Yes	No	Episodes "This Red Lady from Caribee" and "Kindred Spirits"
2016	Legends of Tomorrow	Yes	No	Episode "Destiny"
2016	Blindspot	Yes	No	Episode "Her Spy's Harmed"
2016–17	Bates Motel	Yes	No	Episode "The Vault" and "Visiting Hours"
2017	Gotham	Yes	No	Episode "Smile Like You Mean It"
2017	Colony	Yes	No	Episode "The Garden of Beasts"
2017	The Son	Yes	No	Episode "Death Song" and "No Prisoners"
2017–24	Star Trek: Discovery	Yes	Yes	14 episodes
2018	Timeless	Yes	No	Episode "The Darlington 500"
2018–19	Star Trek: Short Treks	Yes	Yes	Episodes "Calypso" and "The Girl Who Made the Stars"
2022	The Man Who Fell to Earth	Yes	No	Episodes "As the World Falls Down" and "The Man Who Sold the World"

Aftershow appearances

- After Trek (2017)
- The Ready Room (2021)
