= Mary Wiseman (actress) =

American actress

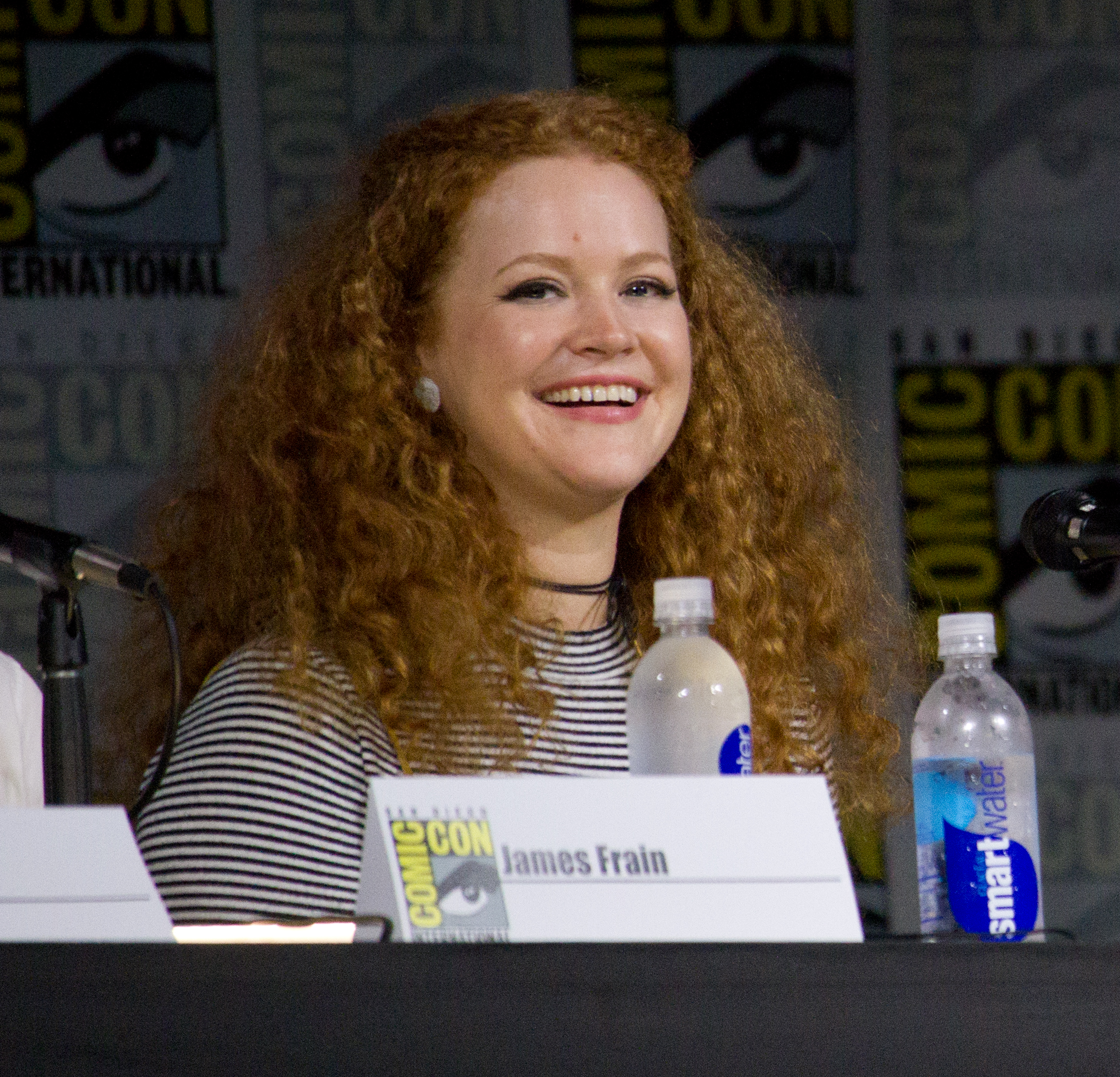
- Wiseman at the 2017 San Diego Comic-Con
- Education: Boston University (BFA); Juilliard School (GrDip)
- Occupation: Actress
- Years active: 2012–present
- Notable work: Star Trek: Discovery
- Spouse: Noah Averbach-Katz (m. 2019; div. 2023)

Mary Wiseman is an American actress. She is best known for starring as Sylvia Tilly in the Paramount+ science fiction drama series Star Trek: Discovery (2017–2024).

== Early life ==
Wiseman is the youngest daughter of Dorothy and Kevin Wiseman and has three older brothers. She was raised in Milford, Pennsylvania and Gaithersburg, Maryland. Wiseman attended the DC Shakespeare Theatre’s high school outreach program. She graduated from Quince Orchard High School in 2003 and later earned her BFA in Theatre Arts at Boston University. She went on to study at Juilliard School's Drama Division between 2011 and 2015, where one of her classmates was future Star Trek: Discovery cast member Mary Chieffo.

== Career ==
Wiseman's stage roles have included Nitzan Halperin's Sow and Weep (2008, Boston University College of Fine Arts in New York), Ariel Carson's I Wanted it to Have a How & I Wanted it to Have a Verb (2011, Dixon Place), and Betsy/Lindsay in Clybourne Park (2013, Chautauqua Theater Company).

Wiseman has performed in productions and workshops of new plays in Playwrights’ theatres like PS 122, The Public, Soho Rep, and New York Theatre Workshop.

Wiseman appeared in the television series Longmire as Meg Joyce, a nurse and love interest for the character Archie "The Ferg" Ferguson.

In 2022, Wiseman's portrayal of the character Carlo from the Off-Broadway play At The Wedding garnered her a Lucille Lortel Award nomination in the category of Outstanding Lead Performer in a Play.

In February 2023, it was announced that Wiseman was cast in an upcoming Shondaland series The Residence as White House executive chef Marvella.

It was announced at the 2024 San Diego Comic-Con that Wiseman will reprise the role of Sylvia Tilly in Star Trek: Starfleet Academy.

== Personal life ==
In 2013, Wiseman began dating actor Noah Averbach-Katz who was her Juilliard School classmate. The couple married on February 16, 2019. Wiseman filed for divorce in March 2023. The divorce was finalized in October 2023.

Wiseman identifies as queer, stating in 2021:

Before Noah, I dated and loved people of all genders. I never liked it when straight-presenting women dominated conversations about bisexuality/pansexuality when I was with women, so I try not to do it now, but I also don’t want it to feel like I’m hiding anything because I’m queer and proud!

== Filmography ==
=== Film ===
Year	Title	Role	Notes
2014	Three Dates	Stacey	Short film
2018	Health to the King	Nurse	Short film
2019	Marriage Story	Theatre Actor	
2023	Type 1	Laura	Short film
2024	Carole & Grey	Carole	
2026	Office Romance	Clair	

=== Television ===
Year	Title	Role	Notes
2012	Craft & Burn	Senior Server	2 episodes
2016	Netflix Presents: The Characters	Shannon	Episode: "John Early"
2016	Difficult People	Lyss	Episode: "High Alert"
2016–2017	Longmire	Meg Joyce	7 episodes
2017–2019	Baskets	Trinity	5 episodes
2017–2024	Star Trek: Discovery	Sylvia Tilly	Main role (53 episodes)
2017	After Trek	Herself	2 episodes
2018	Star Trek: Short Treks	Sylvia Tilly	Episode: "Runaway"
2018	Room 104	Josie	Episode: "Josie & Me"
2019	Carpool Karaoke: The Series	Herself	Episode: "Star Trek: Discovery Cast"
2020–2021	The Ready Room	Herself	2 episodes
2025	The Residence	Marvella	8 episodes
2025	Devil In Disguise: John Wayne Gacy	Karen Kuzma	1 episode
2026	Star Trek: Starfleet Academy	Sylvia Tilly	Episode: The Life of the Stars

=== Video game ===
Year	Title	Role	Notes
2018–present	Star Trek Online	Sylvia Tilly (voice)	
