= Sonequa Martin-Green =

American actress (born 1985)

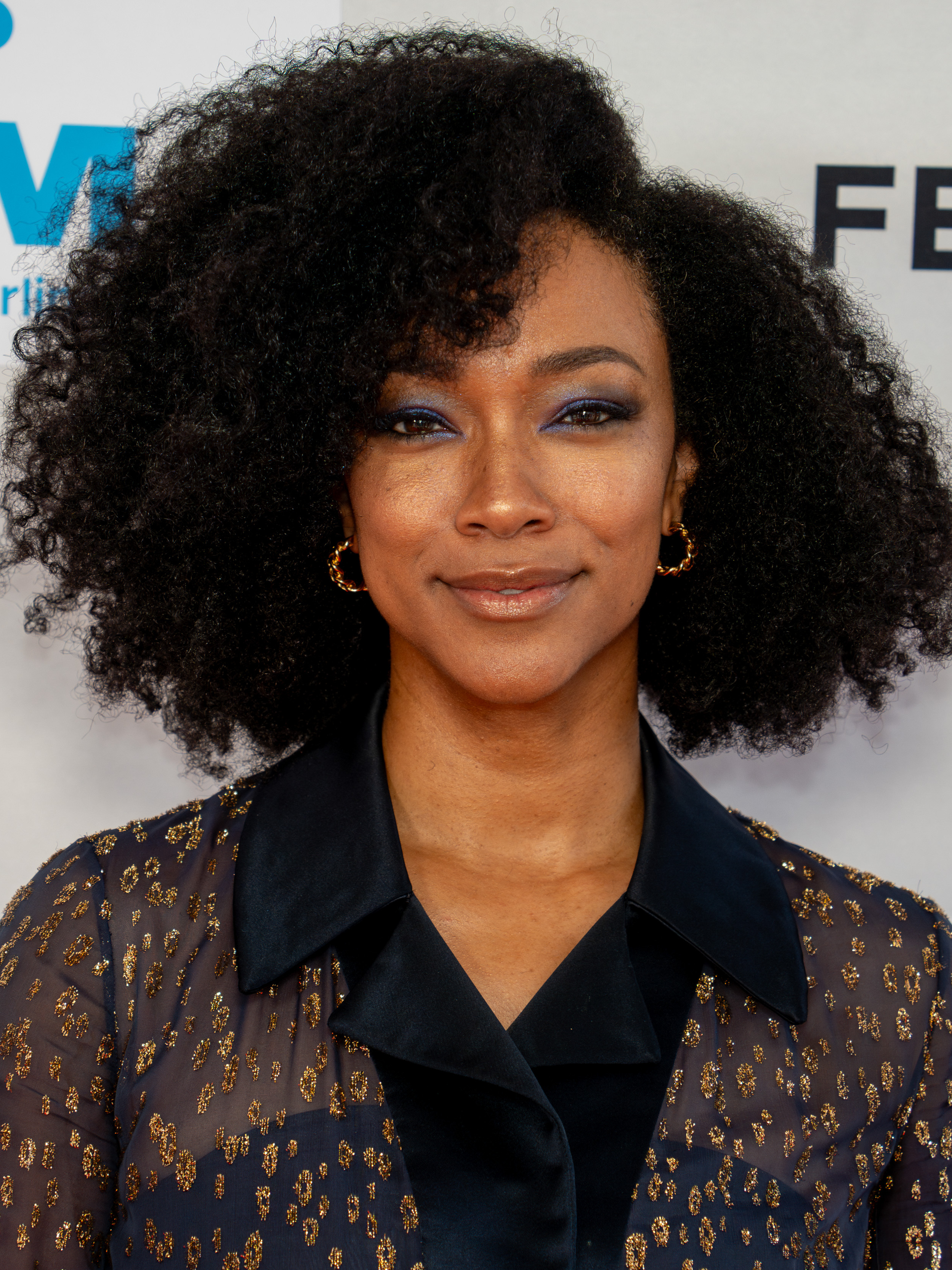
- Martin-Green at the 2025 Tribeca Festival
- Born: Sonequa Chaunté Martin; March 21, 1985 (age 41); Russellville, Alabama, U.S.
- Education: University of Alabama
- Occupation: Actress
- Years active: 2005–present
- Spouse: Kenric Green (m. 2010)
- Children: 2

Sonequa Chaunté Martin-Green (/səˈniːkwə/; née Martin; born March 21, 1985) is an American actress. She is best known for her television roles as Michael Burnham, the main character in the streaming television series Star Trek: Discovery, and as Sasha Williams on The Walking Dead. Before that, Martin-Green starred in several independent films before gaining her first recurring role, as Courtney Wells on The Good Wife. Later, she had recurring roles as Tamara in Once Upon a Time and Rhonda in New Girl. In 2025, she began the role of Detective Lena Silver on the CBS crime drama Boston Blue.

== Early life ==
Sonequa Martin was born and raised in Russellville, Alabama. Her parents were Charles Winston Martin (1943–2021) and Vera Lynn Martin-Moore (née Freeman; 1950–2021). Her parents divorced and her mother remarried. In April of 2021, her parents died one day apart. Her father died after a short cancer battle. Her mother, a three-time cancer survivor, died of a heart attack the next day.

Martin-Green has one full sister, NaKisha, and three older paternal half-sisters.

Martin-Green initially planned to become a psychologist before deciding in the tenth grade to pursue a career in acting. On her decision to become an actor, she said, "I didn't know I was going to be an actor until I was 16. I thought I was going to be a psychologist, which is interesting because it's very similar to acting. I was fascinated with human behavior and why people do what they do. I was in the middle of rehearsal in 10th grade when I had this epiphany. And so I got my theatre degree from the University of Alabama."

Martin-Green graduated from the University of Alabama in 2007 with a degree in theatre.

== Career ==
=== Film ===
While known primarily for her television roles, Sonequa Martin-Green made her film debut in 2009. In 2009, she played the lead role of Tosha Spinner in Toe to Toe opposite Louisa Krause, the fiercely determined scholarship student who seeks to build a brighter future outside of Anacostia and away from one of Washington's poorest neighborhoods. The film focuses on her friendship and rivalry with Jessie (Louisa Krause), a privileged girl from Bethesda whose promiscuous tendencies threaten to become her undoing. They both strive to gain a better understanding of one another's plight as society threatens to drive them ever farther apart. The film received generally positive reviews, with Martin-Green's performance receiving critical acclaim, even from the film's detractors. In November 2018, it was announced Martin-Green would star in The Outside Story, opposite Brian Tyree Henry, directed by Casimir Nozkowski. In July 2021, she played the role of Kamiyah James in Space Jam: A New Legacy.

=== Television ===
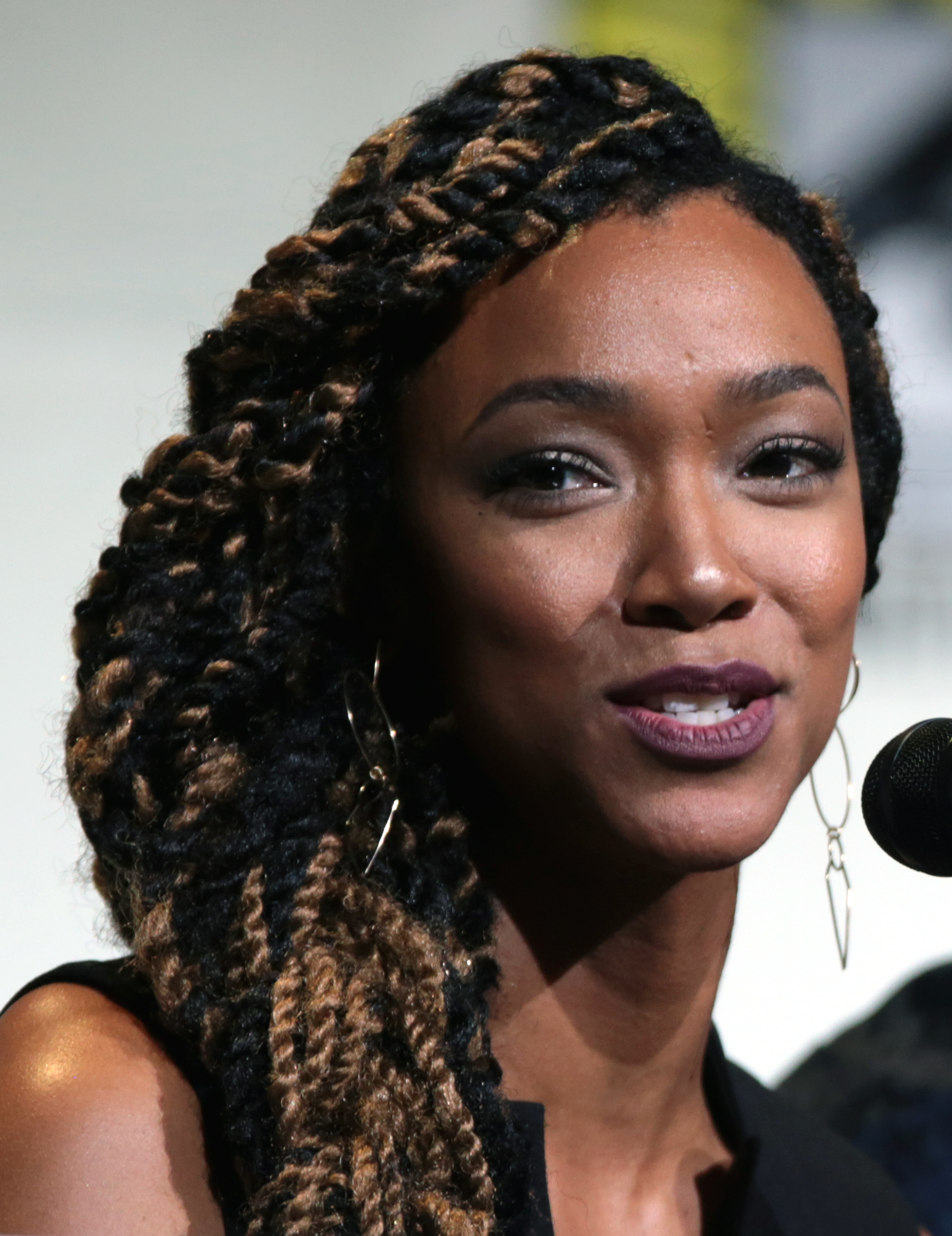
Martin-Green at the 2016 San Diego Comic-Con for The Walking Dead

Martin-Green has had various guest and recurring roles in TV shows. She made her television debut in 2008, appearing on NBC's Law & Order: Criminal Intent as Kiana Richmond. She then gained her first recurring role on Army Wives as Kanessa Jones the following year. In 2009, she received the role of Courtney Wells on The Good Wife, her first recurring role playing an adult character as opposed to playing a teenager with her previous roles in both film and television. She appeared on the show for two years before making two more appearances in Gossip Girl and NYC 22 in 2011.

In 2012, she was cast in a recurring role on The Walking Dead as Sasha, the sister of Tyreese (Chad Coleman), an original character, exclusive to the television series. Martin-Green auditioned for the role of Michonne albeit with a pseudonym due to the secrecy of the auditioning process. When Danai Gurira, who Martin-Green said was "the perfect choice", was cast, former showrunner Glen Mazzara still wanted Martin-Green to be a part of the show and decided to create a role specifically for her instead. Martin-Green explained: "[Sasha] was supposed to be a recurring character and as we kept going forward, they picked up my option to be a regular. It's very rare and I'm still quite dumbfounded about it but Glen and I hit it off and I still appreciate him. He wanted to work with me and wrote Sasha for me". She was promoted to a series regular for season 4 with Emily Kinney and Coleman.

After auditioning for the role of Michonne, she read the first three collected volumes of the comic books in preparation for the television series. Knowing they were different, she chose not to continue reading the comic book series to avoid being aware of future storylines that may occur on the television series. Martin-Green's performance as Sasha, particularly in the fifth season and seventh season, has received favorable reviews.

After filming for the third season of The Walking Dead ended, Martin-Green was cast in the second season of Once Upon a Time playing the recurring role of Tamara, a woman determined to rid the world of magic. She returned briefly in the third season before returning to her regular role as Sasha on The Walking Dead. As of the first episode of sixth season, Martin-Green's name appears in the opening credits.

In December 2016, her role as the lead actor of Star Trek: Discovery was reported in the trade press and officially confirmed by CBS All Access in April of the following year (after her Walking Dead character featured in her final regular appearance). She debuted as First Officer Michael Burnham in "The Vulcan Hello" on September 24, 2017 and has remained the series central character throughout its five seasons. Martin-Green's character was described by series co-creator Bryan Fuller as a "lieutenant commander with caveats"... we've seen six series from the captain's point of view," he explained in early press releases for the show. "To see a character from a [new] perspective on the starship — one who has different dynamic relationships with a captain, with subordinates, it gave us richer context."

== Personal life ==
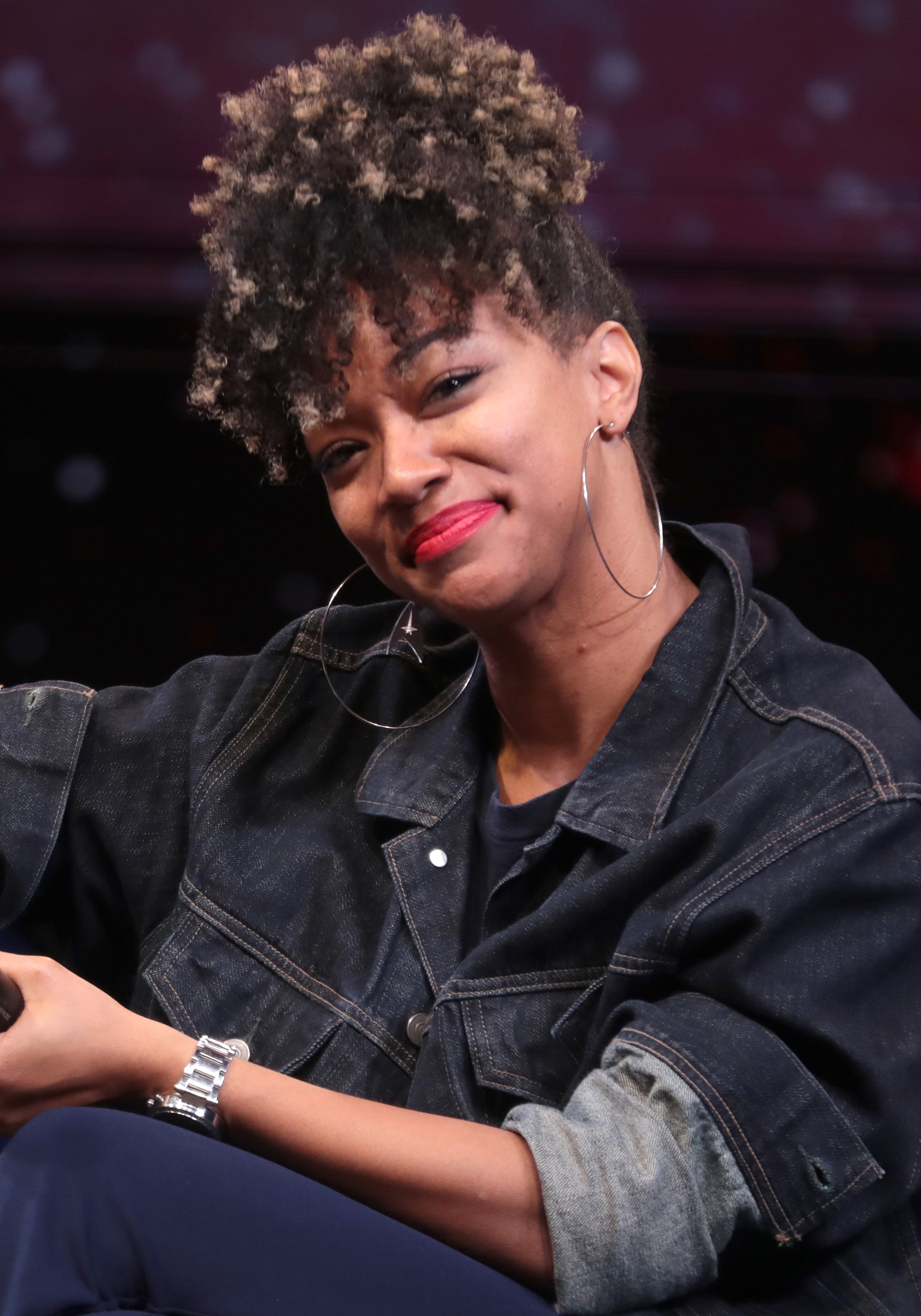
Sonequa Martin-Green in 2023

Martin-Green married fellow actor Kenric Green on December 4, 2010. In 2015, Martin-Green gave birth to a boy. Martin-Green was pregnant during filming of the fifth season of The Walking Dead, which she covered up by wearing thick layers of clothing and using larger guns. In 2020, she gave birth to a girl.

Since April 2016, Martin-Green has been an ambassador for Stand Up to Cancer, encouraging clinical trials, with a special emphasis on outreach in ethnically diverse communities. When interviewed by Essence in February 2018, Martin-Green said that her mother had been fighting three types of cancer and one of her half-sisters had breast cancer. In January 2017, Martin-Green took a government-sponsored trip with her husband to Israel, together with actors Mark Pellegrino, Daniel Dae Kim and Meagan Good, as part of an effort to combat the Boycott, Divestment and Sanctions (BDS) movement.

== Filmography ==
=== Film ===
| Year | Title | Role | Notes |
|---|---|---|---|
| 2005 | Not Quite Right | Coco Delight | |
| 2007 | I-Can-D | VJ | |
| 2008 | Blind Thoughts | Jenna Lopez | |
| 2009 | Toe to Toe | Tosha Spinner | |
| 2009 | Rivers Wash Over Me | Shawna King | |
| 2011 | Da Brick | Rachel | |
| 2011 | Yelling to the Sky | Jojo Parker | |
| 2012 | Shockwave Darkside | Private Lang | |
| 2019 | Holiday Rush | Roxy | |
| 2020 | The Outside Story | Isha | |
| 2021 | Space Jam: A New Legacy | Kamiyah James | |
| 2024 | My Dead Friend Zoe | Merit | |
| 2025 | She Dances | Jamie | |
| 2025 | Sarah's Oil | Rose Rector | |

=== Television ===
| Year | Title | Role | Notes |
|---|---|---|---|
| 2008 | Law & Order: Criminal Intent | Kiana Richmond | Episode: "Legacy" |
| 2009 | Army Wives | Kanessa Jones | 3 episodes |
| 2009–2011 | The Good Wife | Courtney Wells | 8 episodes |
| 2011 | Gossip Girl | Joanna | Episode: "The Jewel of Denial" |
| 2012 | NYC 22 | Michelle Terry | 5 episodes |
| 2012–2017, 2018; 2022 | The Walking Dead | Sasha Williams | 45 episodes (seasons 3–7, 9, 11) |
| 2013 | Once Upon a Time | Tamara | 7 episodes |
| 2016 | Lip Sync Battle | Herself | Episode: "Sonequa Martin-Green vs. Lauren Cohan" |
| 2016–2017 | New Girl | Rhonda | 2 episodes |
| 2017 | Penn Zero: Part-Time Hero | Pirate Maria (voice) | 2 episodes |
| 2017–2024 | Star Trek: Discovery | Michael Burnham | 65 episodes Saturn Award for Best Actress on Television (2018); Saturn Award for Best Actress in Streaming Presentation (2019); Nominated—Saturn Award for Best Actress on Television (2021) |
| 2017–2018 | After Trek | Herself | Aftershow; 2 episodes |
| 2019–2024 | The Ready Room | Herself | Aftershow; 8 episodes |
| 2021 | Invincible | Alana / Green Ghost (voice) | Episode: "It's About Time" |
| 2024 | Accused | Megan Neumann | Episode: "Megan's Story" |
| 2025–present | Boston Blue | Lena Silver | Main cast |

=== Video games ===
| Year | Title | Role | Notes |
|---|---|---|---|
| 2020 | Star Trek Online | Michael Burnham | Episode "Measure of Morality" |
| 2020 | Fast & Furious Crossroads | Vienna Cole | |
| 2024 | Asgard's Wrath 2 | Alvilda | Nominated - Golden Joystick Awards for Best Lead Performer |
