= Mary Chieffo =

American actress (born 1992)

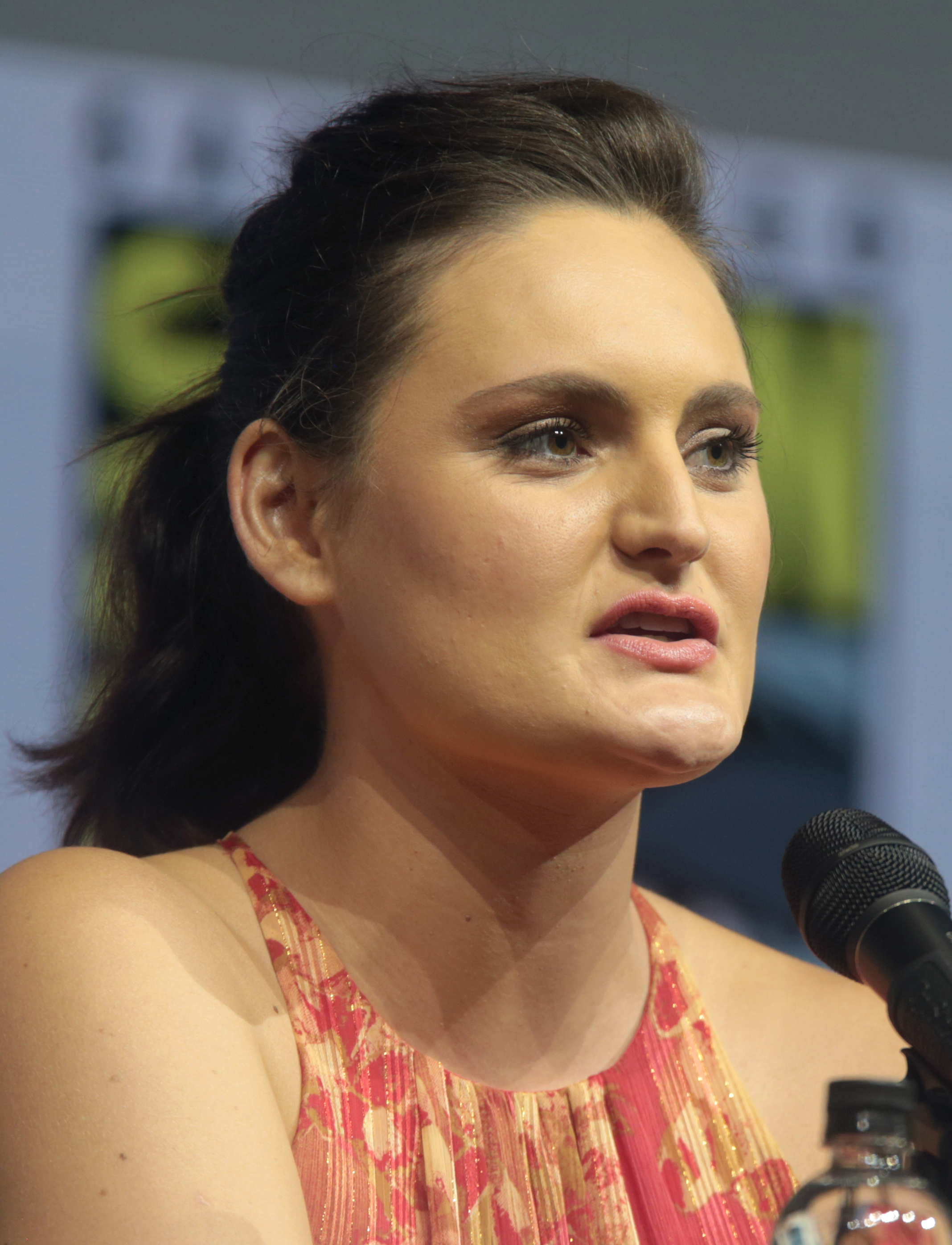
- Born: November 7, 1992 (age 34); Los Angeles, California, US
- Education: Juilliard School (BFA)
- Occupation: Actress
- Years active: 1998–present
- Mother: Beth Grant

Mary Elizabeth Chieffo (born November 7, 1992) is an American actress known for portraying the Klingon L'Rell on the television series Star Trek: Discovery.

== Personal life ==
Chieffo was born on November 7, 1992, in Los Angeles, California. She grew up in the neighborhood of Valley Village, Los Angeles in California, only daughter of actors Michael Chieffo and Beth Grant.

She attended the Drama division of Juilliard School in New York City, earning a Bachelor of Fine Arts degree in 2015. One of her classmates was future Star Trek: Discovery castmate Mary Wiseman.

Chieffo came out publicly as a lesbian on the red carpet prior to the Star Trek Day event held September 8, 2021, at the Skirball Cultural Center in Los Angeles, California. She later clarified that she identifies as "panromantic demisexual and proudly in a lesbian relationship". A few days later, she confirmed via her Twitter feed that she was dating writer and actor Madi Goff. Chieffo wrote the introduction essay for the 2023 edition of Marvel's Voices: Pride #1, reflecting on the need for queer representation in media.

== Career ==
Her first high profile acting position was on Star Trek: Discovery, where she played the recurring character of L'Rell, a Klingon warrior and spy who becomes leader of the Klingon Empire at the end of Season 1. Her writing and producing debut was Operation Othello, a virtual reality adaptation of Shakespeare's Othello, where she also plays Lt. Iago in a gender twist from the original play. In 2022, she reprised her role as Iago in Iago: The Green Eyed Monster, a six-minute futuristic musical AR prequel to Othello, nominated for "Best Immersive Experience" in the 2022 Tribeca Festival. In 2024, she voiced a Klingon in an episode of the animated show Star Trek: Lower Decks.

=== Filmography ===
Film and television
Year	Title	Role	Notes
2017–19	Star Trek: Discovery	L'Rell	recurring character (13 episodes)
2020	Operation Othello	Ensign Iago	VR TV movie, she was also the writer and producer.
2022	Iago: The Green Eyed Monster	Iago	VR short movie, she was also the writer and director.
2024	Star Trek: Lower Decks	K'Elarra	Voice, Episode: "A Farewell to Farms"
