= Star Trek: The Next Generation season 3 =

1989–90 season of American television series

Star Trek: The Next Generation
- Season 3
- Region A/1 Blu-ray cover art
- No. of episodes: 26

Release
- Original network: Broadcast syndication
- Original release: September 25, 1989 – June 18, 1990

Season chronology
- ← Previous; Season 2 Next → Season 4

The third season of the American science fiction television series Star Trek: The Next Generation commenced airing in broadcast syndication in the United States on September 25, 1989 and concluded on June 18, 1990 after airing 26 episodes. Set in the 24th century, the series follows the adventures of the crew of the Starfleet starship Enterprise-D. This season featured the return of Gates McFadden as Dr. Beverly Crusher after she was replaced by Diana Muldaur for the second season. The season also saw the debut of several actors who would reappear in the same roles and others throughout the franchise, such as Dwight Schultz as Lt. Reginald Barclay, and Tony Todd as Kurn.

Further changes occurred to the writing staff, with Michael Piller brought on board as executive producer after Michael Wagner held the position for three weeks. Ronald D. Moore also joined the staff following the submission of a script for "The Bonding". Hans Beimler, Richard Manning, Melinda M. Snodgrass and Ira Steven Behr all left the staff at the end of the season. Actor Wil Wheaton also asked to leave following the way his character, Wesley Crusher, was written during the season, a decision he later regretted. Other changes included a modification to the opening sequence, and changes to the Starfleet uniforms on the show.

The season opened with Nielsen ratings of 10.8 for "Evolution" with the highest-rated episode being "Yesterday's Enterprise", which scored 11.9. This was the highest rating received since the sixth episode of the first season. The lowest rating of the season was received by the 23rd episode, "Ménage à Troi", which was given a score of 9.1. After a couple of initial ranking decreases, the episodes in the second half of the season rose back to third place in its timeslot. The season was well received by critics, who called it one of the best of the series. Particular praise was given to several episodes including "Yesterday's Enterprise", "Sins of the Father" and the first part of "The Best of Both Worlds". Box sets of the season have been released both on DVD and Blu-ray, and "The Best of Both Worlds" was given a limited theatrical release.

== Production ==
=== Writing ===
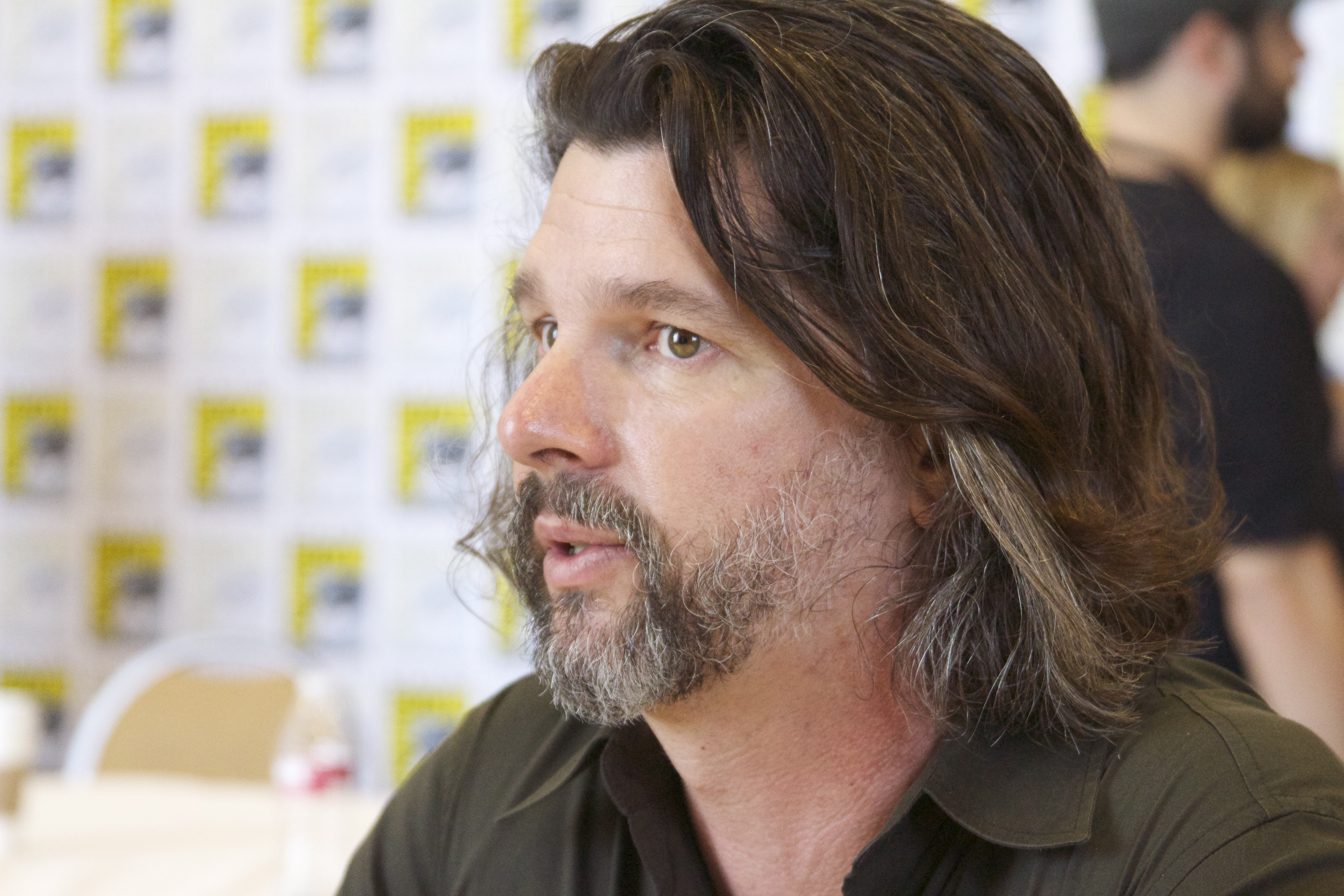
Ronald D. Moore joined the staff of The Next Generation during the third season following the submission of a spec script.

Senior writer Maurice Hurley left at the end of season two, and Michael Wagner was brought onto the show by executive producer Rick Berman. Wagner's tenure was brief, lasting three weeks, and he recommended Michael Piller to replace him. Wagner and Piller had previously worked together on the 1988 American television series Probe. Piller's agent had advised him not to join Star Trek as he would be "pigeon-holed as a freelance writer", but he ignored the advice. He would also look at leaving at the end of the season, but stayed after Berman and show creator Gene Roddenberry convinced him. Piller wrote the episode that opened the season, "Evolution" and took over as executive producer from "The Bonding" onwards. He explained to the writing staff that there were two requirements for every episode, saying that "every episode is going to be about a character's growth. And every episode has to be about something."

The season also saw internal promotions to the existing writing staff. Both Hans Beimler and Richard Manning became co-producers, while Melinda M. Snodgrass became an executive script consultant. Following "The Vengeance Factor", Ira Steven Behr joined the crew as a writing producer. All four writers left the series at the end of the season. Behr would go on to become executive producer for Star Trek: Deep Space Nine. Richard Danus also acted as executive story editor between "Booby Trap" through to "Yesterday's Enterprise". Because of the open door policy on spec scripts Piller employed, the season saw the first script for Ronald D. Moore with "The Bonding". Because of his success with that script, he was subsequently hired as executive story editor from "Sins of the Father" onwards.

Because of the way his character was written during season three, Wesley Crusher actor Wil Wheaton asked to be written out of the series. It was a decision he later regretted, as he realised that all the main cast outside of Picard, Riker and Data had similar roles at the time. He praised the writing of Moore in "The Bonding" and Piller in "Evolution", and said that "Yesterday's Enterprise" was one of his favourite episodes. The season also saw a relaxation in Gene Roddenberry's previous direction that The Next Generation could not touch on aspects of The Original Series. This was seen in the episode "Sarek", but was specifically related to the end of the episode where Captain Jean-Luc Picard mentions Spock during a mind meld with Sarek. Piller described this one act as "the breakthrough which allowed us to open the doors, that allowed us to begin to embrace our past."

=== Casting ===
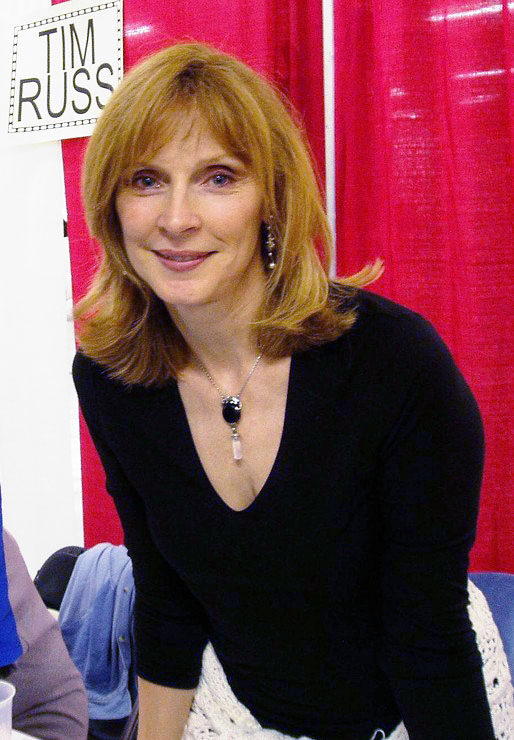
Season three saw the return of Gates McFadden to the main cast role of Dr. Beverly Crusher.

Gates McFadden returned to the role of Doctor Beverly Crusher in the third season, the character had been written out for season two and replaced with Diana Muldaur playing Doctor Katherine Pulaski. Roddenberry had ensured that Crusher was not written out permanently to allow for her return in the future. Keith DeCandido blamed her departure on Maurice Hurley. After he left the series, McFadden returned. At the end of season 2 Patrick Stewart was asked by the producer what he wanted and he asked for new uniforms, more action scenes and for McFadden brought back.

Season three saw further appearances for several recurring characters from the franchise, including John de Lancie as Q in "Deja Q", Majel Barrett as Lwaxana Troi in "Ménage à Troi", who had both appeared in multiple episodes of previous seasons. It also featured an appearance by Mark Lenard as Sarek. Lenard had previously appeared in this role in the Star Trek: The Original Series episode "Journey to Babel" as well as the film franchise. Denise Crosby, whose character Tasha Yar was killed in the first season episode "Skin of Evil", returned in "Yesterday's Enterprise" due to changes to the timeline seen in the series. The events of that episode would set up appearances in The Next Generation for the actress as the half-Romulan character Sela in later seasons.

The season also featured the first appearance of actors who would later reappear both in The Next Generation and later series of the franchise. These included Tony Todd as Worf's brother Kurn, who would appear in this role later in the series and also in Star Trek: Deep Space Nine. "Hollow Pursuits" marked the first appearance of Dwight Schultz as Lt. Reginald Barclay in the franchise. He would become a recurring character in the series, and go on to appear in several episodes of Star Trek: Voyager and the film Star Trek: First Contact (1996). Schultz had previously been known for his role as H. M. Murdock in the television series The A-Team.

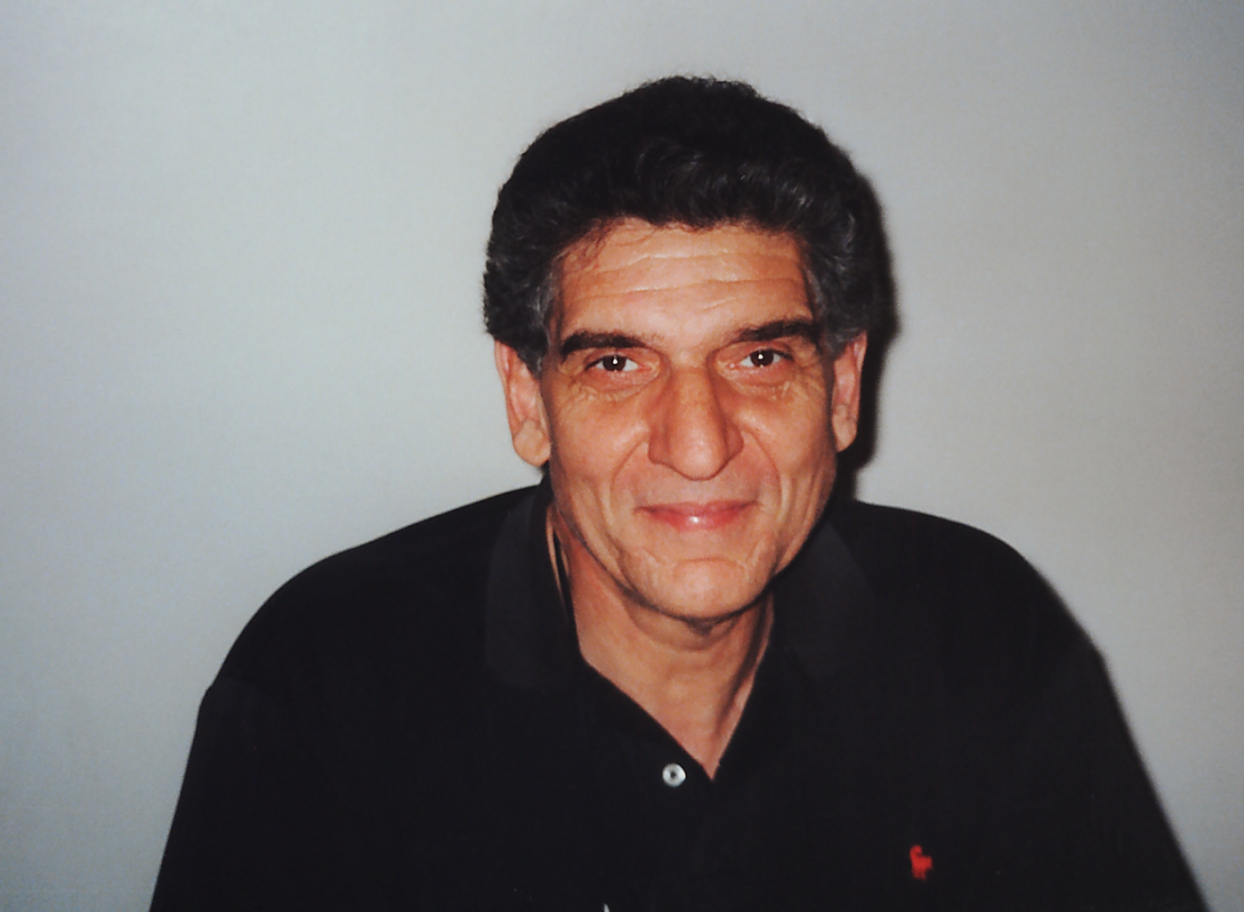
Andreas Katsulas made his first appearances as Tomalak during season three.

Susan Gibney appeared as Dr. Leah Brahms in "Booby Trap", and would later return in that role in "Galaxy's Child". Gibney was also considered for the role of the Captain Janeway in Voyager and played Captain Erika Benteen in the Deep Space Nine episode "Paradise Lost". An actor who later gained a recurring role in Deep Space Nine following an appearance the third season of The Next Generation was Max Grodénchik. He appeared as the Ferengi Sovak in "Captain's Holiday", and as another Ferengi in the fifth season's "The Perfect Mate". In DS9, he was initially cast as a "Ferengi Pit Boss" in the pilot episode, "Emissary". That character would soon become Rom, who by the end of the series was the leader of his race. Jennifer Hetrick also made her first appearance in "Captain's Holiday" as Vash. She would also appear as that character in "Qpid" and Deep Space Nine's "Q-Less".

Andreas Katsulas made his first appearances as the Romulan Tomalak in "The Enemy" and "The Defector." He would later reappear in episodes of later seasons, in both "Future Imperfect" and the series finale "All Good Things...". Charles Cooper and Patrick Massett appeared as K'mpec and Duras respectively in "Sins of the Father", and would also appear in those roles once more in "Reunion" in the fourth season. A number of other actors also appeared during the season in prominent guest star roles, including Saul Rubinek, Tricia O'Neil, Harry Groener and James Sloyan. Groener returned to Star Trek during the final season of Star Trek: Enterprise in a different role during the episodes "Demons" and "Terra Prime".

=== Crew and effects ===
Robert Blackman joined the crew prior to the start of the season as costume designer. He had been recommended by his predecessor, Durinda Rice Wood. He later recalled that he wasn't interested in the job and only took the interview as a favor, but he was so struck by producer David Livingston's enthusiasm that he accepted the post. One of his tasks was to redesign the Starfleet costumes which had been used for the first two seasons. The previous versions were made of spandex and caused back problems in the cast. The new costumes cost $3,000, and were made out of a wool gabardine.

With Roddenberry's permission, Blackman changed the primary color on the uniforms to black with only blocks of red, gold or blue to signify the branch. This change was intended to set off the faces of the cast and to smooth out their figures on screen. While the men's costumes became two piece outfits, the costumes for McFadden and Marina Sirtis remained as jumpsuits requiring them to maintain a specific weight each. It was following the introduction of these costumes that the nickname of the "Picard Maneuver" was given to Patrick Stewart's habit of tugging down his uniform tunic. Blackman also overhauled the Starfleet Admiral's uniforms, and worked on a variety of alien costumes including designed Klingon and Vulcan outfits.

Associate producer Peter Lauritson was promoted to co-producer and both Michael Okuda and Rick Sternbach were credited with the addition title of technical consultant due to the level of technical help they had been giving the writers since the start of the series. The opening sequence of the series was changed from the third season onwards. Instead of showing the Enterprise exiting the Solar System as in the first two seasons, it now showed the vessel coming in from the Milky Way.

== Reception ==
=== Ratings ===
By the end of season two, The Next Generation had risen to become the third most viewed series in its timeslot. "Evolution" opened the third season with Nielsen ratings 10.8 according to Nielsen Media Research. These were among the second lowest ratings of the season, with only the 23rd episode, "Menage a Troi", scoring lower with 9.1. Although other episodes received higher Nielsen ratings, they were ranked lower in comparison to other series in the same timeslot. "The Bonding" was ranked 6th, while "The Vengeance Factor" was ranked 5th. Following the latter, the series rose back to 3rd with only occasional drops to 4th place. "Yesterday's Enterprise" was the highest rated, with Nielsen ratings of 11.9. It was the highest-rated episode since the eighth episode of the first season, "Justice" which was broadcast on November 8, 1987.

=== Reviews ===
Keith DeCandido for Tor.com thought that the third season was where the series "really came into its own". He praised the changes to the show, such as the modification to the uniforms, and especially the new writing staff that joined the crew during the third season. He said that some of the episodes were highlights of the franchise, not just The Next Generation. Those episodes praised were "Sins of the Father", "Yesterday's Enterprise" and the first episode of "The Best of Both Worlds". He particularly thought that the season finale had never been matched in the entire franchise. He summed up the season by saying that it had "solidified TNG as a show that had finally outgrown the shadow of its predecessor and could stand on its own as a truly fine television show."

Michael Simpson in his review of the Blu-ray release for SciFiNow magazine said that season three was where the series "found its feet". He thought that the increase in quality was due to the changes in writing staff, such as the addition of Piller, Echevarria and Moore. He also said that it was the most consistent and memorable season of the series, and several episodes were an "object lesson in clever, suspenseful plotting". Richard Edwards in his review for SFX magazine, said that it was in the third season that the "chemistry really clicked" between the main cast. He compared it to The Original Series, saying that in this season the show started "to vie with Kirk and co for the mantle of Trek's definitive incarnation". He too praised "Yesterday's Enterprise", "Sins of the Father" and "Best of Both Worlds", calling the latter the show's greatest story. In Jeremy Conrad's review of season three for IGN, he said that "Yesterday's Enterprise" and the first part of "Best of Both Worlds" lifted the season and "define[d] it as the best of all seven years".

=== Accolades ===
"Yesterday's Enterprise" was nominated in three categories at the 1990 Emmy Awards, winning one for Outstanding Sound Editing for a Series. "Deja Q" was also nominated in two categories, but was not successful in either. In total, the series was nominated for nine awards, with the only other win coming in the category of Outstanding Art Direction for a Series for "Sins of the Father". "Allegiance", "Tin Man" and "Hollow Pursuits" were the other episodes nominated. For the second year in a row, the series was nominated in two categories at the Youth in Film Awards. At the 1990 awards, they were for Best Off-Prime Time Family Series and Best Young Actor in an Off-Primetime Family Series for Wil Wheaton. However, it did not win in either categories.

== Cast ==
=== Main cast ===
- Patrick Stewart as Captain Jean-Luc Picard
- Jonathan Frakes as Commander William Riker
- Brent Spiner as Lt. Cmdr. Data
- Gates McFadden as Dr. (Cmdr.) Beverly Crusher
- LeVar Burton as Lt. Cmdr. Geordi La Forge
- Marina Sirtis as Counselor (Lt. Cmdr.) Deanna Troi
- Michael Dorn as Lt. Worf
- Wil Wheaton as Acting Ensign Wesley Crusher (Later promoted to the rank of Ensign in the episode "Ménage à Troi")

=== Recurring cast ===
- Colm Meaney as Transporter Chief Miles O'Brien (11 episodes)
- Whoopi Goldberg as Guinan (7 episodes)
- Andreas Katsulas as Commander Tomalak (2 episodes)
- Julie Warner as Christy Henshaw (2 episodes)

=== Guests ===
- Majel Barrett as Lwaxana Troi (1 episode)
- Charles Cooper as K'mpec (1 episode)
- Denise Crosby as Lt. Tasha Yar (1 episode)
- Elizabeth Dennehy as Lt. Commander Elizabeth Shelby (1 episode)
- Susan Gibney as Dr. Leah Brahms (1 episode)
- Jennifer Hetrick as Vash (1 episode)
- John de Lancie as Q (1 episode)
- Mark Lenard as Sarek (1 episode)
- Patrick Massett as Duras (1 episode)
- Dwight Schultz as Lt. Reginald Barclay (1 episode)
- Carel Struycken as Mr. Homn (1 episode)
- Tony Todd as Kurn (1 episode)

== Episodes ==
In the following table, episodes are listed by the order in which they aired.

No. overall	No. in season	Title	Directed by	Written by	Original release date	Prod. code	Nielsen rating
49 (Note: "Evolution" and "The Ensigns of Command" were filmed in a different order to that in which they aired.)	1	"Evolution"	Winrich Kolbe	Story by : Michael Piller & Michael Wagner; Teleplay by : Michael Piller	September 25, 1989	150	10.8
Nanites escape Wesley Crusher's (Wil Wheaton) lab and form a collective intelligence, threatening the Enterprise.
50	2	"The Ensigns of Command"	Cliff Bole	Melinda M. Snodgrass	October 2, 1989	149	Unknown
Data (Brent Spiner) must persuade a stubborn colony to evacuate their homeland under threat of a powerful and mysterious race.
51	3	"The Survivors"	Les Landau	Michael Wagner	October 9, 1989	151	9.6
The Enterprise investigates the last two survivors of an annihilated world, as the entire surface has been destroyed except for their property.
52	4	"Who Watches the Watchers"	Robert Wiemer	Richard Manning & Hans Beimler	October 16, 1989	152	9.6
Counselor Deanna Troi (Marina Sirtis) and Commander William Riker (Jonathan Frakes) must rectify the damage done when two primitives from Mintaka III catch a glimpse of a Federation observation team and eventually conclude that Captain Jean-Luc Picard (Patrick Stewart) is a god. Guest starring Ray Wise.
53	5	"The Bonding"	Winrich Kolbe	Ronald D. Moore	October 23, 1989	153	9.9
A mysterious entity seeks to comfort a boy who has lost his mother in an accident on its planet.
54	6	"Booby Trap"	Gabrielle Beaumont	Story by : Michael Wagner & Ron Roman; Teleplay by : Ron Roman and Michael Piller & Richard Danus	October 30, 1989	154	11.0
The Enterprise falls victim to an ancient booby trap set to snare starships and drain their power supply. While in an effort to find an escape, Lt. Geordi La Forge (LeVar Burton) finds himself falling for the holodeck's representation of an accomplished Federation engineer Dr. Leah Brahms (Susan Gibney).
55	7	"The Enemy"	David Carson	David Kemper and Michael Piller	November 6, 1989	155	10.3
Geordi La Forge is trapped on a harsh planet with a hostile Romulan named Bochra (John Snyder) but the two must work together to survive.
56	8	"The Price"	Robert Scheerer	Hannah Louise Shearer	November 13, 1989	156	10.6
Deanna Troi falls in love with a charismatic negotiator who vies for rights to a wormhole. But several different groups, including the Ferengi, are after the wormhole as it may be the only known stable wormhole in existence.
57	9	"The Vengeance Factor"	Timothy Bond	Sam Rolfe	November 20, 1989	157	9.7
William Riker exposes an assassin bent on carrying out an ancient blood feud in the midst of critical peace talks with a band of nomadic marauders.
58	10	"The Defector"	Robert Scheerer	Ronald D. Moore	January 1, 1990	158	10.5
Determined to avert a war, a Romulan officer defects to warn the Federation of the Empire's invasion plans.
59	11	"The Hunted"	Cliff Bole	Robin Bernheim	January 10, 1990	159	10.6
A genetically modified soldier reveals the social problems of a world hoping to join the Federation.
60	12	"The High Ground"	Gabrielle Beaumont	Melinda M. Snodgrass	January 31, 1990	160	10.5
Dr. Beverly Crusher (Gates McFadden) is kidnapped by terrorists who need medical assistance as the technology employed in their attacks is detrimental to their own health.
61	13	"Deja Q"	Les Landau	Richard Danus	February 5, 1990	161	11.3
The Q Continuum strips Q (John De Lancie) of his powers, and dumps him aboard the Enterprise.
62	14	"A Matter of Perspective"	Cliff Bole	Ed Zuckerman	February 12, 1990	162	10.8
Commander Riker is accused of murder and the holodeck is used to reconstruct the events from different perspectives.
63	15	"Yesterday's Enterprise"	David Carson	Teleplay by : Ira Steven Behr & Richard Manning & Hans Beimler & Ronald D. Moore; Story by : Trent Christopher Ganino & Eric A. Stillwell	February 19, 1990	163	11.9
The USS Enterprise-C arrives from the past causing a shift in reality and the return of the deceased Tasha Yar (Denise Crosby).
64	16	"The Offspring"	Jonathan Frakes	René Echevarria	March 12, 1990	164	10.2
Lt Cmdr. Data creates a young gynoid, Lal (Hallie Todd), which he considers his daughter. But a Starfleet Admiral arrives demanding she be removed from the Enterprise.
65	17	"Sins of the Father"	Les Landau	Story by : Drew Deighan; Teleplay by : Ronald D. Moore & W. Reed Moran	March 19, 1990	165	11.1
Lt. Worf (Michael Dorn) tries to prove his father's innocence after the Klingon High Council declares that his long-dead father was a traitor and had betrayed a Klingon outpost to the Romulans.
66	18	"Allegiance"	Winrich Kolbe	Richard Manning & Hans Beimler	March 26, 1990	166	10.2
Aliens kidnap Captain Picard and replace him with a duplicate who sends the Enterprise to a pulsar. Meanwhile, the real Picard and three other captives try to escape from their prison.
67	19	"Captain's Holiday"	Chip Chalmers	Ira Steven Behr	April 2, 1990	167	11.7
Captain Picard is convinced to take some much needed shore leave on Risa but gets wrapped up in a woman's treasure hunt.
68	20	"Tin Man"	Robert Scheerer	Dennis Bailey (Note: Credited as Dennis Putman Bailey) & David Bischoff	April 23, 1990	168	10.2
A gifted Betazoid whom Deanna Troi once treated as a patient comes aboard to establish first contact with an unknown vessel near an unstable star before the Romulans do.
69	21	"Hollow Pursuits"	Cliff Bole	Sally Caves	April 30, 1990	169	9.8
Lt. Reginald Barclay's (Dwight Schultz) use of the holodeck as an escape interferes with his duties. Meanwhile, the Enterprise suffers from mysterious and random malfunctions.
70	22	"The Most Toys"	Timothy Bond	Shari Goodhartz	May 7, 1990	170	10.3
Kivas Fajo (Saul Rubinek), an obsessed collector, is determined to add Data to his private collection of unique items.
71	23	"Sarek"	Les Landau	Story by : Peter S. Beagle; Teleplay by : Peter S. Beagle	May 14, 1990	171	10.6
The Enterprise is plagued by an outbreak of violence when it is visited by the renowned Vulcan ambassador, Sarek (Mark Lenard). Discovering that Sarek is suffering from an incurable disease, Captain Picard must allow a mind-meld with him so that the ambassador can complete a last vital negotiation between the Federation and the Legaran.
72	24	"Ménage à Troi"	Robert Legato	Fred Bronson & Susan Sackett	May 28, 1990	172	9.1
The Ferengi kidnap Counselor Deanna Troi, Lwaxana Troi (Majel Barrett), and Commander William Riker.
73	25	"Transfigurations"	Tom Benko	René Echevarria	June 4, 1990	173	10.2
The Enterprise rescues a humanoid with amnesia and incredible healing powers.
74	26	"The Best of Both Worlds, Part I"	Cliff Bole	Michael Piller	June 18, 1990	174	10.1
Captain Picard is kidnapped by the Borg as they begin their invasion of Federation space. In 1997, TV Guide ranked this episode #70 on its list of the 100 Greatest Episodes. In 2009, it moved to #36.

== Home media release ==
The previous Blu-ray releases of The Next Generation has been marked by one-day cinematic releases of chosen episodes. For the third season, the cliffhanger episode was broadcast for the first time with both parts of "The Best of Both Worlds" shown in cinemas on April 25, 2013. The two-part episode also received an individual Blu-ray release which coincided with the releases of the season three box set.

Star Trek: The Next Generation – Season 3
Set details		Special features	
26 episodes; 7-disc set; 1.33:1 aspect ratio; Subtitles: Danish, German, English, Spanish, French, Italian, Dutch, Norwegian, Swedish, English for the hearing impaired; English (Dolby Digital 5.1 Surround), German, Spanish, French and Italian (Dolby Digital 2.0 Surround)		DVD and Blu-ray: Mission Overview: Year Three; Selected Crew Analysis: Year Three; Departmental Briefing: Year Three: Production; Departmental Briefing: Year Three: Memorable Missions; "Yesterday's Enterprise" audio commentary by David Carson; Blu-ray only: Inside the writer's room; Resistance is Futile – Assimilating Star Trek: The Next Generation (HD); Part One: Biological Distinctiveness; Part Two: Technological Distinctiveness; Part Three: The Collective; "The Bonding" audio commentary by Ronald D. Moore, Mike and Denise Okuda; "Yesterday's Enterprise" audio commentary by Ronald D. Moore, Ira Steven Behr and Mike and Denise Okuda; "The Offspring" audio commentary by René Echevarria and Mike and Denise Okuda; "Sins of the Father" audio commentary by Ronald D. Moore, Dan Curry and Mike and Denise Okuda; In Memoriam David Rappaport; A tribute to Michael Piller (HD); Gag Reel (HD); Episodic promos	
Release dates
DVD		Blu-ray	
Region 1	Region 2	United States (Region free)	United Kingdom (Region free)
July 2, 2002; April 16, 2013 (re-released)	July 22, 2002; May 22, 2006 (re-released)	April 30, 2013	April 29, 2013
