= The Offspring (Star Trek: The Next Generation) =

- Star Trek: The Next Generation episode
- Episode no.: Season 3 Episode 16
- Directed by: Jonathan Frakes
- Written by: René Echevarria
- Production code: 164
- Original air date: March 12, 1990

Guest appearances
- Hallie Todd as Lal; Leonard Crofoot as Lal (mannequin version); Nicolas Coster as Admiral Anthony Haftel; Whoopi Goldberg as Guinan; Judyann Elder as Ballard

Episode chronology
← Previous "Yesterday's Enterprise"	Next → "Sins of the Father"
- Star Trek: The Next Generation season 3

"The Offspring" is the 16th episode of the third season of the American science fiction television series Star Trek: The Next Generation, and the 64th episode of the series overall.

Set in the 24th century, the series follows the adventures of the Starfleet crew of the Federation starship Enterprise-D. In this episode the android Data creates a "child" of his own named Lal and tries to raise her, while Picard takes on Starfleet Research to keep them from taking her away.

This was the first episode directed by Jonathan Frakes, who went on to direct many Star Trek television episodes and two Star Trek feature films.

== Plot ==
Data invites Deanna Troi, Wesley Crusher and Geordi La Forge to his lab and surprises them by introducing a featureless humanoid android, whom he created based on his own structural design and recent advances in Federation cybernetics technology, describing it as his child. He names the android Lal (after the Hindi word for "beloved") and encourages it to select a gender and appearance. With Troi's assistance and considering many of the on-board species as well as the databanks, Lal narrows down to four possibilities, including a Klingon male, which, as Troi points out, would make it "a friend for Worf", but in the end selects the appearance of a young female human.

Data first aids Lal with cognitive and standard behavioral algorithms, as well encourages her to interact with other members of the crew to learn behavioral and social customs. After a failed attempt to place her in school, due to the other children being intimidated by her, he places her under Guinan's care at the ship's lounge, Ten Forward. This leads to some awkward moments, such as Lal misunderstanding the concept of flirting and kissing, which she first interpreted as "attacking" until Guinan makes an effort at explaining the practice. Intrigued by this, Lal engages in suddenly dragging and kissing Commander Riker over the bar, leaving him baffled and earning him a fatherly scolding à la "What are your intentions towards my daughter?" when Data walks in on them. Lal nevertheless adapts very quickly, even, to everyone's amazement, surpassing Data as stated by her ability to use contractions, something Data never achieved.

Captain Jean-Luc Picard, being informed about Lal and her progress, expresses concern to Data for constructing Lal in secrecy, but Data reminds him that he would not express such concern were two human crewmembers to decide to procreate, to which the captain has little argument. Nevertheless, Picard, as per general orders, reports to Starfleet, prompting Admiral Haftel to arrive to evaluate Lal. From the outset, Haftel is determined to transfer Lal to a Starfleet science facility. He interviews Lal, where she reveals her desire to remain on the Enterprise with her father, but Haftel is unmoved.

Upon leaving the meeting, Lal visits Troi in the counselor's quarters. Lal is clearly confused and distraught, and to Troi's amazement, reveals that she is feeling fear. Experiencing an overload of information and emotions, Lal soon stops speaking and wanders off, eventually returning to Data's lab (as she is programmed to do in the event of a malfunction).

In the meantime, Haftel meets with Data and orders him to release Lal into Starfleet's custody. Though Data moves to comply, Picard orders him to stand fast and reminds him and the Admiral that Data is a sentient life form with defined rights and cannot be ordered to turn what is in essence his child over to the state. But before the discussion can get any more tense, they are interrupted by a call from Troi who explains what has happened to Lal and asks everyone to come to Data's lab at once.

Upon arriving, Data's diagnostics find Lal's emotional outburst is a symptom of a cascade failure in her positronic brain, and they must work fast to stop it. Seeing Data's sincerity, Haftel offers to assist Data, who accepts. Some time later, a worn-out Haftel leaves the lab and informs Troi, Wesley, and Geordi that they have failed. Visibly moved at Data's determination to save his child, Haftel explains the failure was irreparable. He is visibly overwhelmed himself, concluding that Lal will not survive for long. Data apologizes to Lal that he could not save her, but Lal thanks Data for her creation. She lets him know she loves him and will feel the emotion for both of them. Data returns to the bridge, and Picard conveys the crew's condolences, but Data reveals that he has downloaded Lal's memories into his own neural net, sustaining Lal's memories and experiences.

== Production ==
The episode was directed by Jonathan Frakes, who also portrayed Commander William Riker. It was the first of many Star Trek episodes to be directed by a member of the cast. It was Frakes' directorial debut. The episode was written as a spec script by René Echevarria and was bought by the show. Echevarria did a rewrite which was touched up by staff writers. Echevarria was subsequently hired to rewrite the episode "Transfigurations" and became a regular writer and story editor for the show.

This episode also served as a farewell to one of the background actors, James Becker, who served as an extra and a stand-in for Jonathan Frakes during the first three seasons of the show. Although his character never received an official name, his cast and crewmates referred to him as "Ensign Youngblood" as an affectionate tribute to the way Becker's personality shined clean and fresh. For this episode, Frakes gave Becker his first and only word of dialogue – "Gentlemen" – as well his first and only on-screen credit.

== Reception ==
"The Offspring" is rated 4.6/5 on StarTrek.com. Actor Michael Dorn said it was one of his two favorite episodes, the other being "The Drumhead", which was also directed by Jonathan Frakes. Patrick Stewart said it was also one of his favorite episodes, along with "The Inner Light" and "In Theory" (Stewart's own directorial debut).

In 2011, Forbes magazine cited "The Offspring" as one of the top ten Star Trek episodes exploring the implications of advanced technology.

In 2016, The Hollywood Reporter rated "The Offspring" the 79th best television episode of all Star Trek franchise episodes to that point, including live-action and animated series but not counting the movies. In 2016, Empire ranked this the 40th best out of the top 50 episodes of the 700 plus Star Trek television episodes.

In 2017, Nerdist ranked "The Offspring" the 8th best episode of Star Trek: The Next Generation. Also in 2017, Den of Geek ranked this episode as one of the top 25 "must watch" episodes of Star Trek: The Next Generation. In 2019, The Hollywood Reporter ranked it among the top 25 episodes of Star Trek: The Next Generation. Variety listed "The Offspring" as one of the top 15 episodes of Star Trek: The Next Generation.

In 2020, GameSpot recommended this episode for background on the character of Data. In 2020, SyFy Wire noted this episode for its relationship between Picard and Data, and also for being "heartbreaking" when Data makes a robot kid. Screen Rant, IGN and Space.com recommended this episode as background for the series Star Trek: Picard. In 2020, Tom's Guide listed this one of the best episodes for the show's android, Data. In 2020, Looper listed this as one of the best, but saddest episodes for Data.

== Releases ==
The episode was released with Star Trek: The Next Generation season three DVD box set, released in the United States on July 2, 2002. This had 26 episodes of Season 3 on seven discs, with a Dolby Digital 5.1 audio track. It was released in high-definition Blu-ray in the United States on April 30, 2013.
