= The Defector (Star Trek: The Next Generation) =

- Star Trek: The Next Generation episode
- Episode no.: Season 3 Episode 10
- Directed by: Robert Scheerer
- Written by: Ronald D. Moore
- Production code: 158
- Original air date: January 1, 1990

Guest appearances
- James Sloyan as Adm. Alidar Jarok; Andreas Katsulas as Cmdr. Tomalak; John Hancock as Adm. Haden; Simon Templeman (credited as "S.A. Templeman") as John Bates; Majel Barrett as Computer Voice

Episode chronology
| ← Previous "The Vengeance Factor" | Next → "The Hunted" |
- Star Trek: The Next Generation season 3

"The Defector" is the tenth episode of the third season of the American science fiction television series Star Trek: The Next Generation, and the 58th episode of the series overall.

Set in the 24th century, the series follows the adventures of the Starfleet crew of the Federation starship Enterprise-D. In this episode, a Romulan defector requests asylum aboard the Enterprise after claiming to possess vital information about an imminent Romulan invasion.

== Plot ==
While Data is performing a scene from Shakespeare’s Henry V under Captain Picard's direction, they are interrupted by a notification that a Romulan scout vessel is fleeing a Romulan warbird through the Neutral Zone, and approaching Federation space. The Enterprise intercepts the ship, and the Warbird retreats. The occupant of the ship claims he is Sub-Lieutenant Setal, a logistics clerk seeking to defect to the Federation after learning about a secret Romulan installation on the planet Nelvana III, within the Neutral Zone, that could sustain a large Romulan fleet.

Picard and his crew are skeptical of Setal's claims after he refuses to provide evidence, and Picard orders an investigation of Setal's reliability. After Setal's ship auto-destructs, the crew review the records of his arrival, and suspect that the Romulans have arranged Setal's appearance as part of an elaborate hoax. Picard refuses to enter the Neutral Zone on the baseless claims.

Setal confides to Data that his defection came at a heavy price; he will never see Romulus or his family again. Data attempts to alleviate Setal's feelings by taking him to a holodeck representation of Romulus. Setal dismisses the hologram, and reveals he is Admiral Jarok, a high-ranking officer who led a vicious campaign against several Federation outposts. Jarok again beseeches Picard to investigate Nelvana III, explaining that he has defected to protect his family from a possible war. After persuading Jarok to disclose detailed tactical information about Romulan capabilities, Picard orders the Enterprise to Nelvana III.

When they arrive, the crew find no evidence of any installation, to Jarok's surprise. Unexpectedly, two Romulan warbirds decloak and fire upon the Enterprise. Picard realizes Jarok was used as a pawn by the Romulans, feeding him disinformation to lure the Federation into the Neutral Zone. In response to Romulan commander Tomalak's demand for the Enterprise's surrender, Picard reveals that he prepared for this: three Klingon Birds-of-Prey, sent by the Klingon Empire at Picard's request, decloak and surround the warbirds, rendering the situation a stalemate. The Romulans retreat, allowing the Enterprise to leave.

Soon, the crew discovers that Jarok has committed suicide, leaving behind a note for his family. While Data notes that relations with the Empire make delivery of the letter impossible, Picard states that as long as there are Romulans with Admiral Jarok's courage and conviction, it may, one day, be possible to deliver Jarok's letter.

== Notes ==
- In addition to his regular role of Captain Picard, Patrick Stewart also played the role of the holodeck character of "Michael Williams" from Shakespeare's Henry V, Act 4, Scene I, in the opening scenes of the episode. Stewart, who performed the role under heavy prosthetic makeup, requested this out of his love for Shakespeare—Stewart was a member of the Royal Shakespeare Company. Stewart uses a regional English accent from the Black Country, an area between Birmingham and Wolverhampton; his version is of the strong 'Gornal' variety of Black Country dialect.
- This is the second episode written by Ronald D. Moore; the episode earned him a position on the show's writing staff. Moore would have a long association with Star Trek, staying with Star Trek: The Next Generation through its final season, then moving to Star Trek: Deep Space Nine; he became a co-executive producer. Moore co-wrote the first two feature films based on The Next Generation, Star Trek Generations and Star Trek: First Contact.
- The planet Nelvana III is named after the popular Canadian animation studio Nelvana.

== Releases ==
On June 6, 1995 "The Defector" was released with "Vengeance Factor" on LaserDisc in the United States by Paramount Home Video, and in Japan on July 5, 1996, in the half season set Log. 5: Third Season Part.1 by CIC Video. This included episodes up to "A Matter of Perspective" on 12-inch double sided optical discs. The video was in NTSC format with both English and Japanese audio tracks.

The episode was released with Star Trek: The Next Generation season three DVD box set, released in the United States on July 2, 2002. This had 26 episodes of Season 3 on seven discs, with a Dolby Digital 5.1 audio track. It was released in high-definition Blu-ray in the United States on April 30, 2013.

== Reception ==
In 2019, Screen Rant ranked this episode's character introduction, Admiral Jarok, as the tenth most important Romulan of the Star Trek franchise. Later that year, they noted "The Defector" as one of the top ten important episodes to watch in preparation for the series Star Trek: Picard. In 2020, SyFy also recommended watching "The Defector", in this case as background on Romulans for Star Trek: Picard. They note the episode highlights the layers of trust and mistrust between the forces at work in the Romulan Star Empire, and how this complicated its relations with other quadrant inhabitants.

In 2020, Vulture recommended this episode to accompany viewing Star Trek: Picard, noting how it establishes the Romulans' lust for power and tendency for deception.
