= The Price (Star Trek: The Next Generation) =

- Star Trek: The Next Generation episode
- Episode no.: Season 3 Episode 8
- Directed by: Robert Scheerer
- Written by: Hannah Louise Shearer
- Production code: 156
- Original air date: November 13, 1989

Guest appearances
- Matt McCoy as Devinoni Ral; Elizabeth Hoffman as Bhavani; Castulo Guerra as Seth Mendoza; Scott Thomson as Goss; Dan Shor as Arridor; Kevin Peter Hall as Leyor; Colm Meaney as Miles O'Brien; Majel Barrett as Computer Voice

Episode chronology
← Previous "The Enemy"	Next → "The Vengeance Factor"
- Star Trek: The Next Generation season 3

"The Price" is the eighth episode of the third season of the American science fiction television series Star Trek: The Next Generation, and the 56th episode of the series overall.

Set in the 24th century, the series follows the adventures of the Starfleet crew of the Federation starship Enterprise-D. In this episode, several groups, including the Federation, bid for rights to manage the entrance to a wormhole near a resource-poor planet.

== Plot ==
The crew plays host to a group of visiting interplanetary dignitaries who are negotiating for the rights to a stable wormhole to the Gamma Quadrant discovered by the Barzan people, which could provide a valuable and efficient "bypass" through known space. Deanna Troi, overwhelmed by her duties as ship's counselor, reluctantly agrees to attend the delegations' reception. She meets Devinoni Ral, secretly a fellow empath and negotiator for one of the groups. Ral and Troi immediately fall into a passionate affair.

Meanwhile, talks over the rights to the wormhole come to a boiling point. Resolved to take over the rights, the Ferengi use a poison to incapacitate the Federation representative, Seth Mendoza. Captain Jean-Luc Picard selects First Officer William Riker to replace Mendoza in representing the Federation's interests. Riker recommends that the USS Enterprise conduct an exploratory expedition into it before committing the Federation to a binding contract. Picard agrees and orders Chief Engineer La Forge and Second Officer Data to take a shuttlecraft into the wormhole. The Ferengi decide to send in a shuttle of their own, in an effort to compete with the Federation. The two craft are surprised to find themselves in the Delta Quadrant; as they monitor the wormhole, La Forge and Data agree that while the "entrance" of the wormhole may be stable, the "exit" is not, which makes the wormhole worthless. Further, they detect signs that the "exit" of the wormhole may move soon, which would prevent them from returning home as expected. Data and La Forge try to warn the Ferengi, but the Ferengi mock their concern and refuse to follow quickly, so Data and La Forge enter the wormhole alone. The Ferengi are then shocked when the wormhole vanishes in front of them, stranding them in the Delta Quadrant.

Meanwhile, on the Enterprise, negotiations for the wormhole continue, as well as the sparks between Troi and Ral. Even though she has fallen for Ral, Troi starts to have some second thoughts about him when he tells her in intimate confidence that he is part Betazoid and that he has been using his empathic abilities to manipulate the opposing delegates in the negotiations.

Ral deftly narrows the competition down to the Federation and his own employers, the Chrysalians. Just before Riker can obtain the wormhole rights, the Ferengi threaten to destroy the wormhole, claiming that an "informed source" has told them that the Federation has made a covert pact with the Barzan premier. Picard requests Riker's presence on the bridge to deal with the situation; in his absence, Ral takes the advantage, and builds his case on the Barzan leader's wishes for peace to win the claim to the wormhole for his group. When Troi realizes that Devinoni staged the entire altercation to sabotage the Federation, her sense of duty forces her to betray his trust and speak out publicly. Before the Barzan premier has a chance to cancel the bargain with Ral and the Chrysalians, the Enterprise shuttle emerges from the wormhole and hails the ship, announcing that it is worthless. Ral then says goodbye to Troi and returns to face his employers for purchasing worthless rights.

== Reception ==
Keith R.A. DeCandido of Tor.com rated the episode 6 out of 10.

In 2020, GameSpot noted this episode as containing one of the most bizarre moments of the series, the startlingly blatant sexual conversation in a workout chat between Troi and Dr. Beverly Crusher.

== Home media releases ==
The episode was released with Star Trek: The Next Generation season three DVD box set, released in the United States on July 2, 2002. This had 26 episodes of Season 3 on seven discs, with a Dolby Digital 5.1 audio track. It was released in high-definition Blu-ray in the United States on April 30, 2013.

On April 23, 1995, "The Price" and "The Enemy" were released on LaserDisc in the United States.

This was released in Japan on LaserDisc on July 5, 1996, in the half season set Log. 5: Third Season Part.1 by CIC Video. This included episodes up to "A Matter of Perspective" on 12-inch double sided optical discs. The video was in NTSC format with both English and Japanese audio tracks.

== See also ==
- Star Trek: Deep Space Nine, a franchise series built around the premise of a stable wormhole located next to a Federation starbase.
- "False Profits", the Star Trek: Voyager sequel episode revealing the fate of the two Ferengi left in the Delta Quadrant.
