= Ménage à Troi =

- Star Trek: The Next Generation episode
- Episode no.: Season 3 Episode 24
- Directed by: Robert Legato
- Written by: Fred Bronson; Susan Sackett
- Production code: 172
- Original air date: May 28, 1990

Guest appearances
- Majel Barrett as Lwaxana Troi; Frank Corsentino as Daimon Tog; Ethan Phillips as Farek; Peter Slutsker as Nibor; Rudolph Willrich as Reittan Grax; Carel Struycken as Mr. Homn

Episode chronology
← Previous "Sarek"	Next → "Transfigurations"
- Star Trek: The Next Generation season 3

"Ménage à Troi" is the 24th episode of the third season of the American science fiction television series Star Trek: The Next Generation, and the 72nd episode of the series overall.

Set in the 24th century, the series follows the adventures of the Starfleet crew of the Federation starship Enterprise-D. In this episode, Commander Riker, Counselor Troi and Ambassador Lwaxana Troi are kidnapped by Ferengi.

== Plot ==
At a reception aboard the Federation starship Enterprise following a trade conference on Betazed, Counselor Deanna Troi argues with her mother, Lwaxana Troi, about her insistence that Deanna get married and raise a family. At the same party, Lwaxana is approached by the Ferengi Daimon Tog of the ship Krayton, who is interested in Lwaxana in a sexual way, but also explains he would like Lwaxana to use her telepathy to help him succeed in business. Lwaxana rejects him flatly, then becomes irate and remarks that she would rather eat Orion Wing Slugs than date Tog. Deanna tries to speak with Lwaxana in her quarters about the incident, but winds up becoming infuriated over Lwaxana's behaviour and leaves.

Afterwards, at the urging of Captain Picard, Commander Riker and Deanna Troi decide to take a quick shore leave on Betazed while the Enterprise heads out on a routine mission studying a nebula. Lwaxana tracks down her daughter and Riker, with intent to encourage a renewed romance between the couple. She is just getting started when Daimon Tog beams down. As Riker expresses his surprise, Tog states that he has come for Lwaxana. When he is again rebuffed by Lwaxana, this time under pain of provoking an interstellar incident, Tog has himself and the others transported aboard the Krayton.

The three awaken in a cell aboard the Krayton. Tog then has Deanna and Lwaxana beamed into the lab of Farek, a Ferengi doctor who hopes to study Lwaxana's telepathy using mind probes. In the process of transporting them he leaves the women's clothing behind, saying that women are not worthy enough to wear clothes. Lwaxana pretends to be interested in Tog, and gains Deanna's return to the cell with Riker by agreeing to discuss with Tog a proposal to use her telepathic abilities in trade negotiations.

Riker entices a Ferengi guard into a chess game, and once outside the cell, Riker quickly overpowers the guard. Once freed, Deanna and Riker attempt to send a message to the Enterprise, only to learn that the ship's communication system is secured by access code. As Lwaxana seduces Tog by rubbing his ears, she receives a telepathic message from Deanna asking her to try to get Tog's access code.

Lwaxana has almost convinced Tog to tell her the code when Farek walks in and catches her in the act. Farek threatens to humiliate Tog by revealing his incompetence to the Ferengi, but offers to forget the incident if Lwaxana is turned over to him for experimentation, despite the fact that the proposed tests may be lethal.

Meanwhile, the Enterprise leaves the nebula, which has been interfering with communications, and learn from Betazed officials that Riker and the Trois have been kidnapped. Returning to Betazed, the Enterprise crew discovers flowers indigenous to a Ferengi planet at the spot where Deanna and Riker were last seen. Picard orders a frequency scan to see if Riker has somehow sent a message, but are unable to pick up anything discernible. Riker taps into the system on the Krayton that suppresses Cochrane distortion from the ship's warp field, and modulates it to generate a signal in a pattern he hopes the Enterprise crew will recognize.

In the midst of the search, Acting Ensign Wesley Crusher is in final preparation to depart to Earth for his second attempt to pass the Starfleet Academy entrance exam. As he is about to leave, he realizes that the modulated interference itself may be the signal, and rushes back to the bridge, missing his transport back to Earth. Decoding the signal, Wesley finds Riker has provided the heading of the Krayton and the Enterprise heads out in pursuit.

In the meantime, Deanna experiences pain as she senses the mind probes being used on her mother. Riker, having finished setting up the modulation of the Cochrane distortion, arms himself and bursts into Farek's lab to free Lwaxana, but a standoff ensues when Tog enters with a phaser. Just then the Enterprise arrives, and Lwaxana buys the release of Troi and Riker by agreeing to stay with Tog. After Riker and Deanna are returned to the Enterprise, Picard (at Deanna's urging) plays the role of a jealous lover, describing his love for Lwaxana and telling Tog that if he cannot have her, no one will, and threatens to destroy the Krayton if she is not delivered to him immediately. Picard recites parts of four of Shakespeare's sonnets (147, 141, 18, and 116), quotes a line from Othello, Act V, scene 2, and recites famous lines regarding love from Canto 27 of "In Memoriam A.H.H.", by Alfred, Lord Tennyson whilst giving orders to fire all weapons at the Krayton if Lwaxana is not back in his arms in ten seconds, then ominously begins a countdown. Fearing for his life, Tog hurriedly beams Lwaxana directly to the Enterprise's bridge, and the Krayton quickly departs; Lwaxana is so taken by Picard's poetic profession of "love" for her that she takes her imagined place on his lap in the command chair. Picard hurriedly rises, graciously offers the captain's chair to Lwaxana, then orders Ensign Crusher to set course for Betazed, and then in a hushed tone sets a speed of "Warp 9!"

Wesley Crusher is later summoned to the ready room by Picard, where he is informed that he will have to wait for another year before he can reapply for entrance to Starfleet Academy; in the interim, he will remain on the Enterprise. Picard, in light of Wesley's contributions to the ship and crew, gives him a field promotion to full ensign.

== Production ==
- Ethan Phillips, who makes his Star Trek debut in this episode as a Ferengi, would later go on to become a regular on Star Trek: Voyager, playing the character Neelix.
- Scenes on Betazed were filmed in the Huntington Library botanic garden.

== Reception ==
In 2018, Entertainment Weekly, ranked "Ménage à Troi" as one of the top ten moments of Jean Luc Picard. In 2018, Tom's Guide rated this episode one of the 15 best episodes featuring Captain Picard.

In 2019, CBR rated "Ménage à Troi" the 7th funniest Star Trek episode.

In 2020, GameSpot noted this episode as one of the most bizarre moments of the series, Picard's speech, which they felt while humorous was close to being ridiculous to them.

Writing for Tor Books in 2013, Keith DeCandido noted the distraction of casting Majel Barrett in a Susan Sackett script with the title it had:

In the “too much information” category, the title is a play on a French term generally used to indicate sex among three people. The episode was co-written by Susan Sackett—who was Trek creator Gene Roddenberry’s personal assistant, and with whom he had a long-term affair—and guest starred Roddenberry’s wife. That isn’t at all weird.

== Releases ==
The episode was released with Star Trek: The Next Generation season three DVD box set, released in the United States on July 2, 2002. This had 26 episodes of Season 3 on seven discs, with a Dolby Digital 5.1 audio track. It was released in high-definition Blu-ray in the United States on April 30, 2013.
