= The Vengeance Factor =

- Star Trek: The Next Generation episode
- Episode no.: Season 3 Episode 9
- Directed by: Timothy Bond
- Written by: Sam Rolfe
- Production code: 157
- Original air date: November 20, 1989

Guest appearances
- Lisa Wilcox as Yuta; Joey Aresco as Brull; Nancy Parsons as Marouk; Stephen Lee as Chorgan; Marc Lawrence as Volnoth; Elkanah J. Burns as Temarek; Majel Barrett as Computer Voice

Episode chronology
← Previous "The Price"	Next → "The Defector"
- Star Trek: The Next Generation season 3

"The Vengeance Factor" is the ninth episode of the third season of the American science fiction television series Star Trek: The Next Generation, and the 57th episode of the series overall. Captain Picard contends with a divided people, the Acamarians. In this episode, the crew of the Enterprise tries to negotiate an end to raids launched by a group called the "Gatherers," but a murder threatens to prevent peace. Several guest stars are featured as Acamarians.

== Plot ==
The Enterprise travels to the planet Acamar III after detecting traces of Acamarian blood at a looted Federation outpost. Sovereign Marouk, the Acamarian leader, suggests that the looting was done by the Gatherers, descendants of Acamarian society a century ago that have turned to piracy to sustain themselves. Marouk initially suggests hunting them down with the help of Starfleet, but Captain Picard convinces Marouk to join him to seek a peaceful resolution, including ending the Gatherers' self-imposed exile. Marouk and her assistant, Yuta, arrive on the ship to help. Commander Riker finds Yuta attractive and tries to get to know her better, but Yuta finds herself unable to open up to him.

The Enterprise crew makes contact with one band of Gatherers led by Brull, and offer negotiations. Brull negotiates with Marouk and Picard, and after hearing the offer, agrees to pass it on to the Gatherer leader, Chorgan. Meanwhile, Yuta meets alone with one of the older Gatherers and touches his cheek, causing the Gatherer to suffer a heart attack. As the man dies, Yuta asserts that she, as the last of her clan, Tralesta, will outlive the Lornak clan. The Gatherer's body is later found but initially assumed that death was by natural causes. However, later investigation by Dr. Crusher reveals that a fast-acting "micro-virus", targeted to attack a specific Acamarian DNA profile, was the cause. Dr. Crusher believes the virus was purposely genetically engineered, and that the death was a targeted murder. At Picard's request, Marouk has her government send data to the Enterprise to investigate the murder.

The Enterprise meets with Chorgan's starship, and Picard, Marouk, and Yuta transport aboard to begin negotiations. At the same time, the Enterprise crew receives the database from Acamar, and find that fifty-three years earlier, another Gatherer suffered a similar heart attack - he too was from the Lornak clan, and a photographic record shows Yuta was present, and clearly has not aged a day. Finding the common clan, Riker discovers that Chorgan is of the Lornak clan, and realizing that Yuta is there to assassinate him, transports over to Chorgan's ship. He interrupts negotiations to prevent Yuta from serving Chorgan a drink, accusing her of the murder. Yuta explains she is the last of five survivors of the Tralesta clan that was wiped out by a Lornak attack, and has undergone genetic alterations to host the virus and to keep herself from aging, allowing her to seek out and murder the Lornak clan to the last person. Riker attempts to talk her out of her revenge at phaser-point, gradually increasing the yield with each successive shot, but she cannot break from her desire for vengeance that she built up over the last several decades. After pleading with her not to try again, she advances once more on Chorgan, and Riker vaporizes her with his phaser.

A truce is negotiated between the two sides; at the conclusion, the Enterprise is assigned a routine survey mission through the now-peaceful sector.

== Releases ==
On June 6, 1995 "The Defector" and "The Vengeance Factor" were released on LaserDisc in the United States by Paramount Home Video.

This was released in Japan on LaserDisc on July 5, 1996, in the half season set Log. 5: Third Season Part.1 by CIC Video. This included episodes up to "A Matter of Perspective" on 12-inch double sided optical discs. The video was in NTSC format with both English and Japanese audio tracks.

The episode was released with Star Trek: The Next Generation season three DVD box set, released in the United States on July 2, 2002. This had 26 episodes of Season 3 on seven discs, with a Dolby Digital 5.1 audio track. It was released in high-definition Blu-ray in the United States on April 30, 2013.

== Reception ==
In 2019, Den of Geek noted this episode for featuring romantic elements. The Tor rewatch commentary termed it "Perfectly average."The A.V. Club rewatch commentary complimented some of the plot dynamics and the dramatic ending, rating it a "B."
