= Sarek (Star Trek: The Next Generation) =

- Star Trek: The Next Generation episode
- Episode no.: Season 3 Episode 23
- Directed by: Les Landau
- Story by: Peter S. Beagle
- Teleplay by: Peter S. Beagle
- Production code: 171
- Original air date: May 14, 1990

Guest appearances
- Mark Lenard as Sarek; Joanna Miles as Perrin; William Denis as Ki Mendrossen; Rocco Sisto as Sakkath; Colm Meaney as Miles O'Brien; John H. Francis as Science division ensign

Episode chronology
← Previous "The Most Toys"	Next → "Ménage à Troi"
- Star Trek: The Next Generation season 3

"Sarek" is the 23rd episode of the third season of the American science fiction television series Star Trek: The Next Generation, and the 71st episode overall. It was originally released on May 14, 1990, in broadcast syndication. The story for the episode was created by Marc Cushman and Jake Jacobs, with the teleplay written by fantasy-novelist Peter S. Beagle. "Sarek" was directed by Les Landau.

Set in the 24th century, the series follows the adventures of the Starfleet crew of the Federation starship Enterprise-D. In this episode, Sarek (Mark Lenard), the father of Spock and a highly regarded but elderly ambassador, is ferried by the Enterprise on his final mission for the Federation. While he is aboard the ship, the crew experiences an outbreak of irrational anger amongst themselves. It is revealed that Sarek has Bendii syndrome, which is telepathically causing the problems among the crew. It is only resolved after the Vulcan mind melds with Captain Jean-Luc Picard (Patrick Stewart).

The appearance of Lenard was originally suggested by Gene Roddenberry as an alternative to an appearance by Leonard Nimoy, as it was suspected that it would be too expensive to have the latter actor reprise the role of Spock on television. Roddenberry had previously barred references to Star Trek: The Original Series in The Next Generation although he did pursue having DeForest Kelley as Leonard McCoy in the pilot episode "Encounter at Farpoint". The inclusion of Sarek in his namesake episode, along with a mention of Spock, was seen by the crew of The Next Generation as a breakthrough, allowing them to reference The Original Series more freely in the future. Sarek's failing health was intended to be a reference to the declining health of Roddenberry. "Sarek" received Nielsen ratings of 10.6 percent; it was praised by critics, who lauded the performances of both Lenard and Stewart.

== Plot ==
Federation Ambassador Sarek (Mark Lenard) of Vulcan has arrived on board the Enterprise with his human wife, Perrin (Joanna Miles). His mission is to attend a conference to lay the foundation for trade relations between the Federation and an alien race called the Legarans, after which time he will retire due to old age. Though Captain Jean-Luc Picard (Patrick Stewart) and his crew attempt to provide for Sarek and have arranged for a chamber music concert for him, the ambassador expresses apprehension and annoyance. Picard is surprised when Sarek starts crying in the middle of the performance, an emotional trait Vulcans normally suppress.

Across the ship, the crew members start to act with uncharacteristic hostility towards one another, leading to a large brawl in the Ten Forward lounge. The onset of the events is tied to Sarek's arrival. Ship's Counselor Deanna Troi (Marina Sirtis) and Chief Medical Officer Dr. Beverly Crusher (Gates McFadden) believe Sarek may be suffering from Bendii syndrome, a rare degenerative neurological disease that only affects aged Vulcans. This condition causes individuals to lose control of their emotions and emit "broadcast empathy", destabilizing the emotions of others around them. Picard attempts to approach Sarek about this, but Sarek's aides deny that there are any problems. Picard asks Lt. Commander Data (Brent Spiner) to speak with Sakkath (Rocco Sisto), Sarek's second assistant, who has mutual respect with Data; Data confirms that Sakkath has been attempting to channel his emotional strength into Sarek, but has been overwhelmed by the pressures of the conference. Picard directly confronts Sarek on the matter, who attempts to deny the problem. When Sarek breaks down emotionally in front of Picard, Picard realizes they may need to cancel the conference.

As Picard prepares to cancel with the Legarans, Perrin arrives and suggests an alternative option: Sarek could mind meld with another, allowing him to temporarily transfer his emotions onto someone else. This would leave Sarek able to successfully complete the conference and maintain his dignity, reputation, and honor. Sarek, however, warns of the possible dangers to the receiver's mind from Sarek's strong emotions. Picard willingly agrees to be the host. Sarek performs the mind meld with Picard, and is able to retain full control of his emotions for the duration of the conference. However, Picard, monitored closely by Dr. Crusher, suffers through the numerous emotions that Sarek has pent-up for years, including his regrets of not being able to show his love for his wife Amanda, their son Spock, or his current wife Perrin. With the conference successfully completed, Sarek prepares to take his leave. Picard lets Perrin know of Sarek's love for her, and Perrin says she has always known it. Sarek thanks Picard for his kindness, and with deep respect states: "We will always retain the best part of the other, inside us."

== Production ==
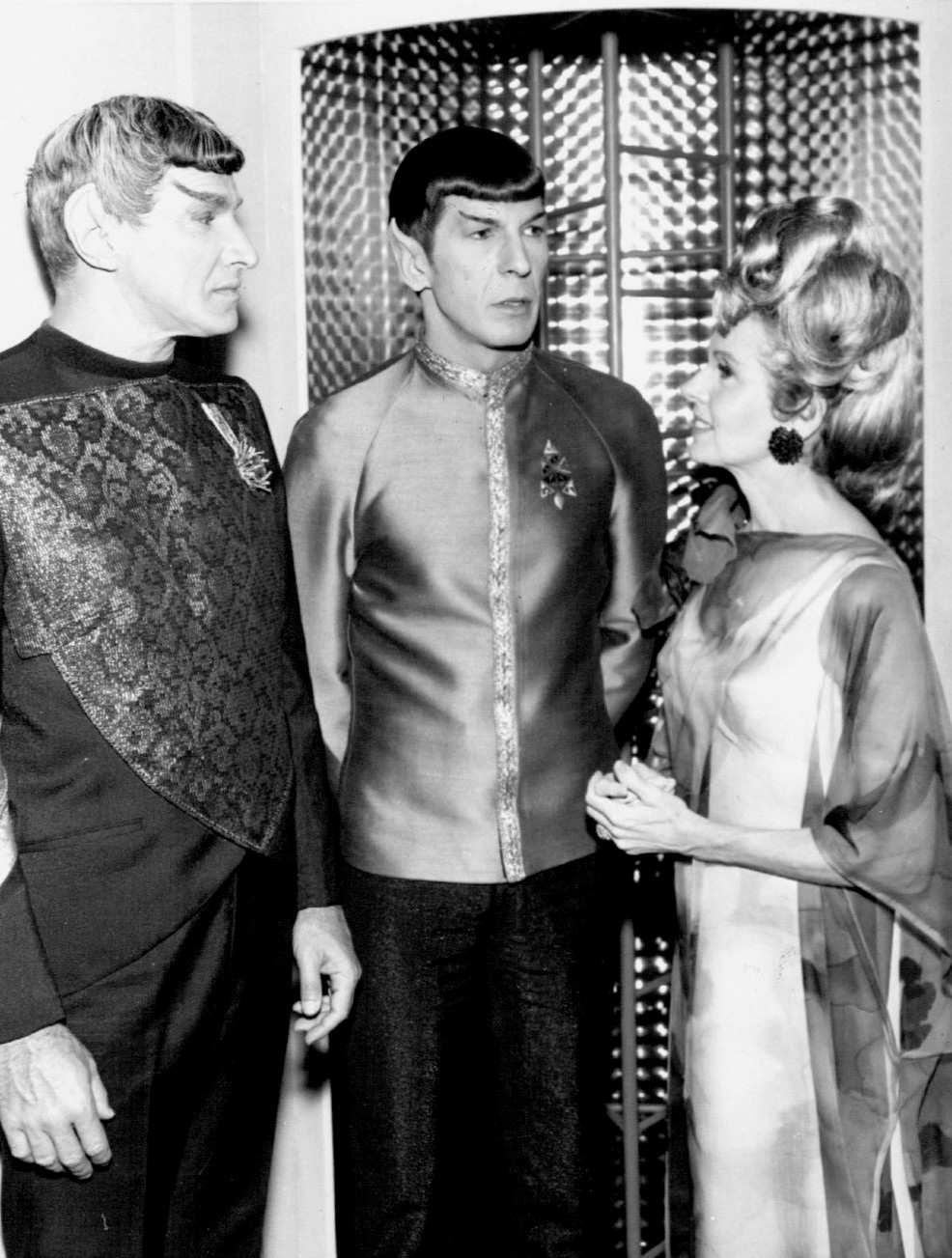
Mark Lenard (pictured left) as Sarek in "Journey to Babel"

Following creator Gene Roddenberry's suggestion that The Next Generation would be unable to afford an appearance by Leonard Nimoy as Spock, it was suggested in a memo that Mark Lenard could appear as Spock's on-screen father, Sarek. Lenard had made his first appearance as Sarek in the Star Trek: The Original Series episode "Journey to Babel". Trent Christopher Ganino and Eric A. Stillwell began to work on a script involving both Lenard as Sarek and Denise Crosby as Tasha Yar. This was because Crosby told Stillwell that she wanted to return to the show after her character was killed off in "Skin of Evil" in the first season of The Next Generation. This script would change over time to become "Yesterday's Enterprise".

Ganino and Stillwell's original pitch for "Yesterday's Enterprise" featured a team of Vulcan scientists, led by Sarek. They accidentally travel to the past using the Guardian of Forever (a time portal seen in The Original Series episode "The City on the Edge of Forever") and kill Surak, the founder of modern Vulcan logic. When they return to the present, they find that the Vulcans are allied with the Romulans and at war with the Federation. Only Sarek and his Vulcan scientists are unaffected by the change, and so he elects to return to the past and replace Surak, allowing the timeline to be restored. Michael Piller was not happy with this script as he wanted the episode to be more centered on The Next Generation cast; as such, Sarek and the Guardian were dropped from the story.

When it was pitched by Marc Cushman and Jake Jacobs, the idea which formed the basis for "Sarek" featured an original character instead of Sarek. The staff writers felt the degenerative disease concept would be a subject that viewers could relate to, as it could be a metaphor for dementia in the elderly. The element of the plot wherein the disease would cause telepathic problems for the rest of the crew was then developed, with Sarek added to the plot at a late stage in order to ensure an emotional impact on the audience. Piller said that "it brings home the idea that even the greatest of men is subject to illness". He also said that the plot was a direct reference to the declining health of Roddenberry. The script was written by noted fantasy author Peter S. Beagle, best known for his 1968 novel The Last Unicorn.

Because of the chronological differences between the settings of The Original Series and The Next Generation, it was decided that Sarek's first wife, Amanda Grayson, would have died by the time of the events of "Sarek". As such, the character of Perrin was created as a second human wife for Sarek. Perrin was played by Joanna Miles in her first Star Trek appearance. Both Miles and Lenard would return in the same roles for the first part of the fifth season episode "Unification". The writers and producers were nervous about mentioning Spock in "Sarek", with an early version of the script only calling for a reference by Picard to Sarek's son's wedding. The third season had seen a relaxation in Roddenberry's previous direction that The Next Generation could not touch on aspects of The Original Series. This was especially seen at the end of "Sarek", in which Picard mentions Spock by name during the mind meld. Piller later described this one act as "the breakthrough which allowed us to open the doors, that allowed us to begin to embrace our past".

The episode features several works of classical music at a concert meant to feature music by Wolfgang Amadeus Mozart. While the first is Mozart's String Quartet No. 19 in C-Major, the second piece is String Sextet No. 1 by Johannes Brahms. The rest of the episode was scored by Dennis McCarthy; "Sarek" was one of several episodes on which he worked. Story editor Ronald D. Moore thought that "Sarek" was better than "Journey to Babel", and it allowed Lenard to do some "solid acting". Director Les Landau also praised Lenard's performance, saying that a moment when a tear rolls down Sarek's face was portrayed as "something special". He added that the dynamics in the mind meld scene reached "a level that I think is classic in Star Trek history", describing Stewart's performance as "truly spectacular". The mind meld scene was shot in a single take.

== Release and reception ==
=== Broadcast ===
"Sarek" aired in broadcast syndication during the week commencing May 12, 1990. It received Nielsen ratings of 10.6, reflecting the percentage of all households watching the episode during its timeslot. This was the highest ratings received by the series since "Captain's Holiday" six weeks earlier. No episodes of The Next Generation received higher ratings until the second part of "The Best of Both Worlds" which opened the fourth season.

=== Critical reception ===
Mark Jones and Lance Parkin, in their book Beyond the Final Frontier: An Unauthorised Review of Star Trek, wrote that "Sarek" "could have simply pressed fanboy buttons", but was actually "a moving story of a great man brought low by old age and illness". They praised Lenard, but thought that Stewart "steals the show with an extraordinary performance". Chris Gregory, in his book Star Trek: Parallel Narratives, suggested that Bendii syndrome as seen in this episode "has echoes of Alzheimer's disease". James Van Hise and Hal Schuster, in The Complete Trek: The Next Generation, compared the plot of "Sarek" to that of The Original Series episode "Day of the Dove". They described "Sarek" as "excellent" and said that it was "exciting and emotional, with real conflicts overcome by real people". They added that "TV doesn't get much better than this."

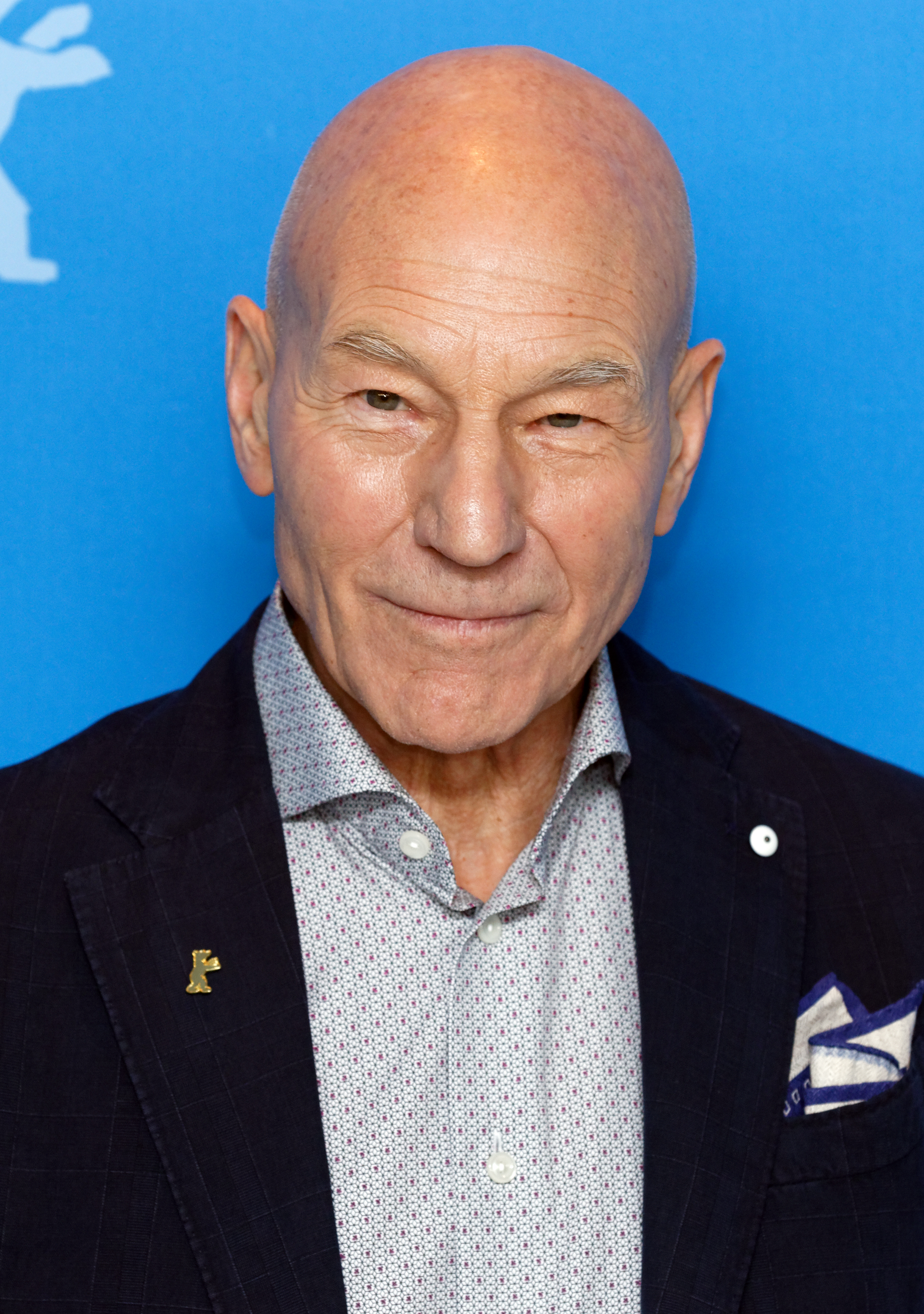
Reviewers praised Patrick Stewart's (pictured in 2017) performance in the mind meld scene, which was shot in a single take.

Zack Handlen reviewed the episode in 2010, for The A.V. Club, giving it a rating of an A. He praised the fact that there was no mystery to the episode, and that it was instead explained immediately that Sarek was the cause of the crewmembers' problems. He added that there was a "beautiful simplicity to this concept, an elegance that makes the tragedy at the heart of the episode all the more powerful". Handlen said that the scene in which Picard deals with the emotions of Sarek after the mind meld was a "remarkable work, a level of naked, raw intensity that we rarely get on [The Next Generation], and in the hands of a lesser actor (basically anyone else in the ensemble), this could've been ridiculous".

Keith DeCandido, in a 2012 review for Tor.com, gave the episode a score of 7 out of 10. He said that the majority of the guest cast were "pretty nowhere", but that the backbone of the episode was Lenard portraying Sarek, "one of the most beloved recurring roles in the franchise's history, and this episode is a beautiful illustration of why". He called the telepathy plot "dopey sci-fi stuff", but praised the direction of Landau in—among others—the concert scene, which he called a "tour de force". He said, however, that the standout part of the episode was the interaction of Stewart and Lenard, who he referred to as "two great actors at the absolute top of their game". He said that "Stewart simply owns the mind-meld, a turbulent, raw scene that leaves the character of Sarek completely exposed, and Stewart sells it amazingly. At that point, the plot contrivances are forgotten, as you realize that the whole episode was worth it to watch this amazing scene".

James Hunt, reviewing "Sarek" for Den of Geek in 2014, appreciated the episode's metaphor for the declining health of Gene Roddenberry. He felt that there was no follow-up to the emotional disturbances suffered by the crew, but said that despite this the episode worked because of the presence of Lenard as Sarek. He said that "they cunningly build up [Sarek's] respect for Picard throughout the episode so that the proposed solution to his problem doesn't seem too far-fetched, and the rapport between Lenard and Stewart is so immediate that you can believe a literal mind-meld makes sense for the characters. It's not a perfect episode in terms of its writing, but the acting sells it far better than it could've." In 2014, the episode was ranked as the 70th best out of the over 700 episodes in the Star Trek franchise by Charlie Jane Anders for io9.

In a 2016 article highlighting the best episode from each Star Trek series, Digital Trends gave "Sarek" an honorable mention. In 2017, Den of Geek ranked Mark Lenard as Sarek in Star Trek: The Next Generation as one of the top ten guest star roles on Star Trek: The Next Generation, noting his performances in "Sarek" and also in "Unification" (Parts I & II).

In 2017, Nerdist ranked "Sarek" the eleventh best episode of Star Trek: The Next Generation. In 2017, ScreenRant ranked this episode the 8th thematically darkest episode of the Star Trek franchise, noting how it tackles the difficulty of disease in old age; in this case the previously well respected diplomat Sarek is "emotional, unpredictable, and disoriented" due to the fictional Bendii syndrome. They compare this fictional Star Trek disease to real diseases such as Alzheimer and Parkinsons.

In 2019, The Hollywood Reporter listed this episode among the twenty five best episodes of Star Trek: The Next Generation.

=== Home media release ===
The first home media release of "Sarek" was on VHS cassette, appearing on October 3, 1995 in the United States and Canada. The episode was later included on the Star Trek: The Next Generation season three DVD box set, released in the United States on July 2, 2002. The first Blu-ray release was in the United States on April 30, 2013.
