= Transfigurations =

- Star Trek: The Next Generation episode
- Episode no.: Season 3 Episode 25
- Directed by: Tom Benko
- Written by: René Echevarria
- Production code: 173
- Original air date: June 17, 1990

Guest appearances
- Colm Meaney as Miles O'Brien; Mark LaMura as John Doe; Julie Warner as Christy Henshaw; Charles Dennis as Sunad; Patti Tippo as Temple

Episode chronology
← Previous "Ménage à Troi"	Next → "The Best of Both Worlds, Part I"
- Star Trek: The Next Generation season 3

"Transfigurations" is the 25th episode of the third season of the American science fiction television series Star Trek: The Next Generation, and the 73rd episode of the series overall.

Set in the 24th century, the series follows the adventures of the Starfleet crew of the Federation starship Enterprise-D. In this episode, the Enterprise rescues a critically injured amnesiac who is undergoing a mysterious transformation.

== Plot ==
The Enterprise discovers a crashed escape pod in an unexplored star system. The crew find one critically injured passenger and bring him aboard the ship. Dr. Crusher determines the survivor will live due to his amazing recuperative powers, and notes that his cells are mutating.

When the stranger awakens, he has no memory of his identity; Crusher nicknames him "John Doe". As weeks pass, John recovers physically, but occasionally suffers from severe pain which is somehow tied to his ongoing mutation. He also begins emitting strange, bright energy bursts. John soon discovers that he can use this energy to heal injuries.

In the meantime, Geordi La Forge investigates a device recovered from John's vessel and determines the location of John's home planet. However, John's memory has begun to return, and he senses that he must not return yet. Soon, a vessel approaches the Enterprise, and John declares he must leave. He tries to steal a shuttlecraft, and accidentally knocks Lieutenant Worf from a walkway with an energy burst, killing him. John uses his healing powers to revive Worf. Prevented from escaping, John explains that he wanted to leave as he is becoming a danger to himself and the crew.

Commander Sunad of the intercepting ship communicates with the Enterprise, announcing he is from the planet Zalkon, and that John is a criminal facing a death sentence. Captain Picard refuses to release John to the Zalkonians without more information as to the charges. When Picard mentions John's strange powers, Sunad is alarmed and triggers a device which causes the entire Enterprise crew to become unable to breathe. John heals everyone aboard the Enterprise with one bright flash of his energy.

His memory now restored, John teleports Sunad to the Enterprise and explains that his race has reached a new stage in evolution, in which they are becoming beings of energy. His homeworld's government fears what is happening and kills any who show the signs of change; John and others were escaping from their homeworld when attacked. John then becomes the first to complete the transformation, becoming invulnerable.

John offers to help Sunad make this transformation as well, but Sunad still refuses. John sends Sunad back to his own ship, warning him that their government can no longer keep their people in ignorance. The Zalkonian ship retreats. John bids the Enterprise crew good-bye, transforms into energy and departs the ship.

== Reception ==
Keith R. A. DeCandido of Tor.com gave the episode 7 out of 10.

== Releases ==
On October 3, 1995 "Best of Both Worlds, Part I" and "Transfigurations" were released on LaserDisc in the United States.

The episode was released with Star Trek: The Next Generation season three DVD box set, released in the United States on July 2, 2002. This had 26 episodes of Season 3 on seven discs, with a Dolby Digital 5.1 audio track. It was released in high-definition Blu-ray in the United States on April 30, 2013.

== See also ==
- 2001: A Space Odyssey – Science fiction film, famous for exploring similar themes relating to humanoid evolution
