= Michael Williams (Henry V) =

- Henry V character
- Created by: William Shakespeare

Michael Williams is a character in William Shakespeare's Henry V. He is one of three soldiers visited by King Henry V before the Battle of Agincourt (1415).

While walking among his troops on the eve of battle, the King arrives incognito upon a trio of soldiers. They are ruminating on their chances of mere survival, let alone victory in the coming fight. The King pretends to be a junior officer and joins in the discussion. Michael Williams espouses his view on the responsibilities a commander has for the men in his charge, to the extent that he may even be responsible for their souls. He has the grand setpiece speech that includes the line, "There be few that die well that die in a battle." If the men die in a state of unreconciled sin, their subsequent damnation could be the fault of the King who brought death upon them. The King successfully rebukes this, however, as all people are responsible for their own souls.

There is some speculation as to the merits of the King surrendering himself for ransom in order to save the lives of his soldiers. Henry declares he knows the King would never allow himself to be ransomed and would fight the enemy to the death. Williams shows he knows some of the psychology involved, and declares that of course the King would say that, "to make us fight cheerfully: but when our throats are cut he may be ransomed and we ne'er the wiser." The King says in his guise that if that happened, he would "never trust the King after." Williams finds that remark to be so ridiculous as to be outrageous – as if the King would care whether an ordinary man trusted his word or not. The King in return finds he cannot allow his word as a man to be doubted. Williams and Henry agree to settle their argument after the battle, should they live, both wearing charges of the other so they could be recognised.

After Agincourt, the victorious King is in a playful mood, and he presents Williams' glove to Fluellen, the Welsh captain, pretending it is a French trophy. When Williams strikes Fluellen to settle the score of the previous night, Fluellen threatens Williams with treason. The King separates them with apologies to Fluellen and promises of gold to Williams for showing honour and bravery. Fluellen tries to add a small amount to Williams' purse, but Michael Williams replies to him, "I will none of your money."

In his review of Laurence Olivier's version in 1944, reviewer James Agee calls this exchange "the most inspired part" of the play, as Michael Williams presents the only challenge to Henry in any way, and almost the only personal conflict. Williams' bravery and intelligence is shown as a spur to Henry's own conscience.

In the 1989 film adaptation of Henry V, Williams was played by the British actor Michael Williams. In this version, there is a wordless scene after Agincourt in which the King simply gives the glove to Williams, who initially looks thankful but then shocked as he realizes he has quarreled with the King. The character also appears in the 1990 Star Trek: The Next Generation episode "The Defector", in Data's holodeck re-enactment of Act IV, Scene I, played under heavy makeup by Patrick Stewart, who had asked to portray Williams or John Bates due to his unabashed love of Shakespeare.
