= Yesterday's Enterprise =

- Star Trek: The Next Generation episode
- Episode no.: Season 3 Episode 15
- Directed by: David Carson
- Story by: Trent Christopher Ganino; Eric A. Stillwell
- Teleplay by: Ira Steven Behr; Richard Manning; Hans Beimler; Ronald D. Moore
- Cinematography by: Marvin V. Rush
- Production code: 163
- Original air date: February 19, 1990

Guest appearances
- Denise Crosby as Tasha Yar; Christopher McDonald as Richard Castillo; Tricia O'Neil as Rachel Garrett; Whoopi Goldberg as Guinan

Episode chronology
← Previous "A Matter of Perspective"	Next → "The Offspring"
- Star Trek: The Next Generation season 3

"Yesterday's Enterprise" is the 63rd episode of the American science fiction television series Star Trek: The Next Generation. It is the 15th episode of the third season, first airing in syndication in the week of February 19, 1990. Set in the 24th century, the series follows the adventures of the Starfleet crew of the Federation starship Enterprise-D. In this episode, the ship's crew must decide whether to send the time-travelling Enterprise-C back through a temporal rift to its certain destruction, to prevent damaging changes to their timeline.

The plot for "Yesterday's Enterprise" was based on the merging of two story ideas—one featured the crew of the time-traveling Enterprise-C and the other the return of Denise Crosby, whose character Tasha Yar had been killed in the series' first season. Trent Christopher Ganino and Eric A. Stillwell rewrote the merged story to feature the character of Guinan more prominently. To complete the episode in time for sweeps, the final script was finished by a team of five writers.

Filming of the episode lasted a week, with some elements of the script ultimately not included due to time constraints. In syndication, "Yesterday's Enterprise" outperformed most of the third season's episodes with a 13.1 Nielsen rating, the third-highest number for the series at the time. The episode is cited as a favorite by crew members and reviewers, and is widely regarded as one of the best episodes of the series.

== Plot ==
The starship USS Enterprise (NCC-1701-D) encounters a rift in spacetime. The crippled USS Enterprise-C, a ship believed destroyed more than two decades earlier, emerges. The Enterprise-D instantly undergoes a radical change from its previous timeline: it is now a warship, and the United Federation of Planets is at war with the Klingons. Neither Worf nor Counselor Troi are present, and Tasha Yar—killed years before in the original timeline—runs the tactical station. Only Guinan senses that reality has shifted, and meets with Captain Picard. She suggests that the Enterprise-C must return to the past to restore the original timeline. Picard, knowing this would be a suicide mission, refuses to give such an order based on Guinan's intuition alone.

Captain Rachel Garrett of the Enterprise-C and her crew learn they have traveled into the future. Garrett explains that they responded to a distress call from a Klingon outpost on Narendra III, and were attacked by Romulan starships. While his crew repairs the Enterprise-C, Picard and his command staff discuss whether the ship should return to the past. Commander Riker argues that their deaths would be meaningless, but Data suggests that it would be considered an honorable act by the Klingons. Picard discusses the situation with Garrett, revealing to her that the Federation is on the verge of defeat and one more ship will make no difference, but if the Enterprise-C returns to the past they might prevent the war from starting. Garrett agrees and tells her crew that they will return through the anomaly. The two ships are ambushed by a Klingon Bird of Prey; Garrett is killed, and her helmsman, Richard Castillo, takes command.

During the repair efforts, Yar becomes close to Castillo, but is unnerved by tense interactions with Guinan. Guinan reveals that she knows Yar dies a meaningless death in the other timeline. Yar requests a transfer to the Enterprise-C. As the Enterprise-C prepares to return through the anomaly, three Klingon battlecruisers attack. With the anomaly becoming unstable, Picard orders the Enterprise-D to cover the Enterprise-C's withdrawal. The Enterprise-D suffers massive systems damage and major crew losses, including the death of Commander Riker. With the Enterprise-D on the brink of destruction, the Enterprise-C traverses the anomaly, triggering the return of Enterprise-D's previous timeline. Guinan – the only one subtly aware of what has transpired – asks Geordi La Forge to tell her about Yar.

== Production ==
=== Development ===
At the beginning of Star Trek: The Next Generation's third season, Michael Piller became the head writer for the series. Among the changes he implemented was the opening of the story submission process to non-professional and unrepresented writers. Despite Paramount Television's resistance to the change, The Next Generation became the first show produced in Hollywood to allow such writers to submit their scripts. The studio received more than 5,000 scripts in a year.

Among the scripts submitted by freelance or aspiring writers was one by Trent Christopher Ganino. Ganino's speculative script, submitted to the office of pre-production associate Eric A. Stillwell in April 1989, was titled "Yesterday's Enterprise". The story involved the Enterprise-D's response to a crisis in the Golecian sector and an encounter with the Enterprise-C, which had been destroyed 18 years earlier. The crew of the Enterprise-C is in awe of the newer ship's technology, and Picard is confronted with whether to reveal to his guests their ultimate fate. An Enterprise-C ensign accidentally discovers the fate of his vessel and panics, requiring Worf and Riker to capture him after he attempts to escape. When Golecian warships attack, Picard defends the Enterprise-C using the same maneuver that caused the vessel's destruction in the past. The ensign goes back to his ship, which returns to the past and its certain destruction.

Due to the backlog of scripts, the processing of draft submissions could take anywhere from weeks to a year. Ganino's script was "logged" on May 2 and first read later that month by Richard Manning, a co-producer on the writing staff. Manning commented that the draft was "not horrible, not particularly original, but good in spots, lousy in others". This review was enough to keep the script in circulation.

Executive story editor Melinda Snodgrass read Ganino's speculative script for "Yesterday's Enterprise" in June and attached a Post-It note declaring the story an "interesting idea". A "coverage" of the script, which outlined the plot and provided creative feedback, was written in August. This analysis called the script a "good effort by an unrepresented writer", and considered the script's weak characterization and plot issues correctable. The main issue was whether the producers wanted to do a show with time travel.

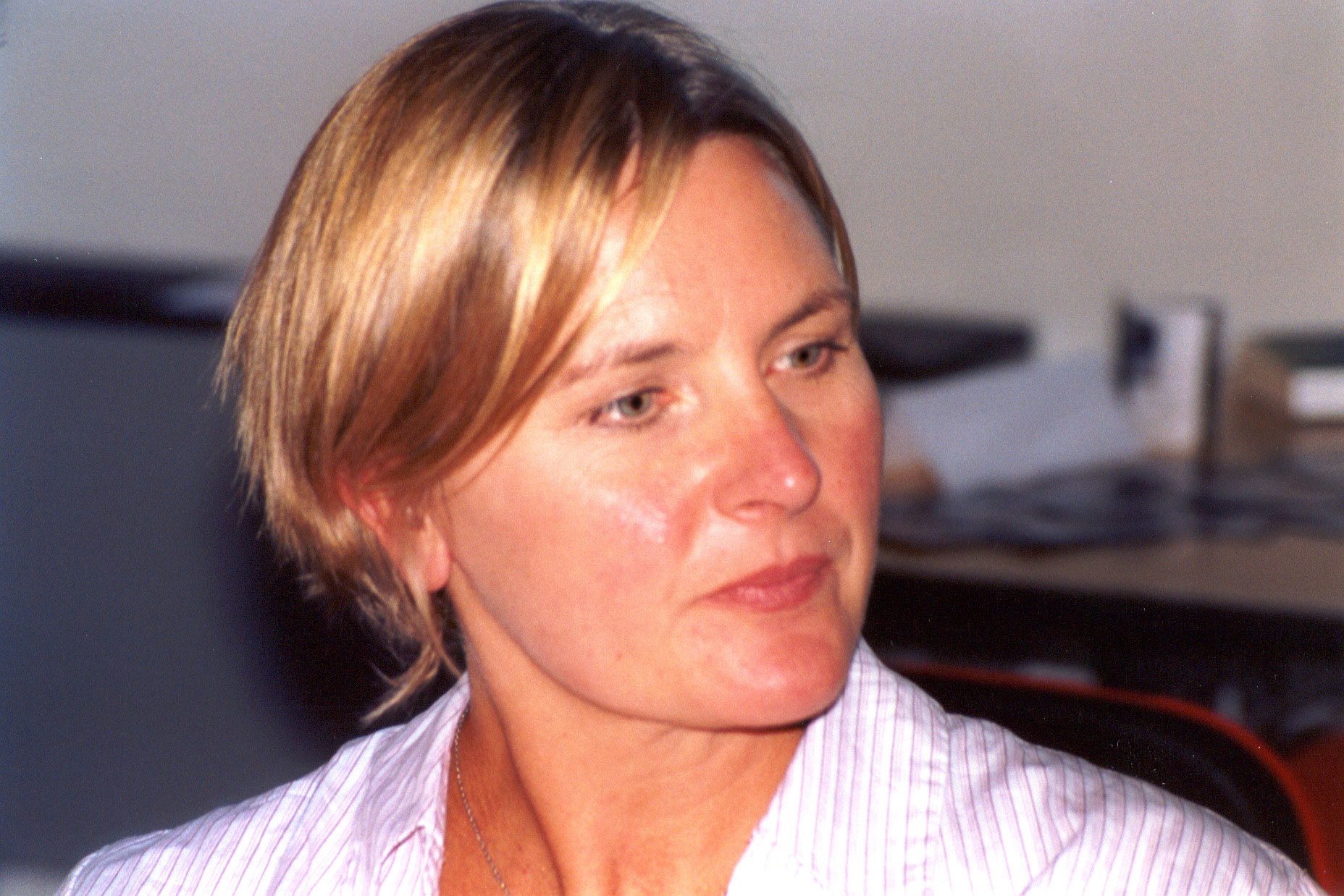
Ganino's original script was rewritten to feature a guest appearance by former regular Denise Crosby.

Meanwhile, Ganino and Stillwell struck up a friendship and began to develop ideas for other episodes. Gene Roddenberry had distributed a memo that said the return of Leonard Nimoy as Spock would be unlikely due to financial considerations, and suggested that a reasonable alternative would be to feature Mark Lenard, who played Spock's father Sarek. During the same period, Stillwell met Denise Crosby – who played Tasha Yar in the series' first season – at a 1989 fan convention in San Jose. Over dinner, Crosby admitted she missed being part of the series and suggested that Stillwell write a script to bring back her character, who was killed off in the episode "Skin of Evil". Ganino and Stillwell began to work on script ideas that would involve both Yar and Sarek.

Ganino and Stillwell were particular fans of two episodes from the original Star Trek series, "Mirror, Mirror" and "The City on the Edge of Forever", and wanted to combine elements from them for a Next Generation episode. They came up with a story involving a team of Vulcans investigating the Guardian of Forever. In the past, the founder of modern Vulcan logic, Surak, is killed, causing massive changes to the timeline. The Romulans and Vulcans joined forces to attack the Federation, Worf is no longer a crewmember on the Enterprise, and Tasha Yar remains alive. Sarek and the Vulcans by the Guardian are the only people not affected by the timeline change and, in the end, Sarek returns to the past to take Surak's place, restoring the timeline.

After Ganino and Stilwell pitched him the new script, Piller suggested to producer Rick Berman that the story, not the script, be purchased. In a meeting, Piller told Ganino that he wanted to make changes to the story, which included the addition of Tasha Yar. Fearing that what they considered a better story would be lost if the changes were made to "Yesterday's Enterprise", Stillwell talked to Piller and pitched their Guardian of Forever story. While intrigued by elements of the story, Piller felt the use of the Guardian was a "gimmick" and wanted The Next Generation to stand on its own. Instead, Piller suggested that they merge the two stories, with Stillwell and Ganino sharing writing credit. Piller suggested that the Enterprise crew would immediately undergo a transformation due to the presence of the older Enterprise, and that Guinan would be integral to the realization that something was wrong. Ganino and Stillwell were given two weeks to complete their new story.

=== Writing ===
Ganino and Stillwell completed their new combined story in about a week. The writers spent hours each day at Stillwell's apartment working over every detail; they felt pressured to write a story Piller would find acceptable, as they wanted to have the opportunity to write the teleplay. The story treatment was turned in on October 10. Piller immediately decided to purchase the story and distributed the treatment to the writing staff while he discussed changes. Piller felt that Data's romantic feelings for Tasha Yar were over the top, and that an alien probe which served as a central part of the story was a cheat in terms of resolving Picard's dilemma. The writer wanted Ganino and Stillwell to enhance Guinan's role and to find another character arc for Tasha Yar. A revised treatment was submitted on October 29, incorporating Piller's changes. The writers were not involved in development of the teleplay. They were each paid the Writers Guild minimum of $2400.

The production of the episode, originally scheduled for January 1990, was moved to December 1989 to accommodate the filming availability of Crosby and Whoopi Goldberg, who played Guinan. The task of writing and polishing the new treatment in half the time fell upon writer Ronald D. Moore, who submitted his first draft on November 9. Moore's script removed the alien probe and made the alternate universe militaristic, with the Federation and the Klingons at war. Some characters, such as Troi, appeared only briefly at the beginning of the episode to allow more screen time for the guest characters. The beat sheet for the episode, which detailed characters and scenes, was distributed on November 27.

Due to time constraints, a team of writers was assigned to write the teleplay. In addition to the story credit to Ganino and Stillwell, Moore, Ira Steven Behr, Hans Beimler and Richard Manning would work on the teleplay, and Piller would provide the finishing touches. Because the Writers Guild would not allow more than three staff writers to appear in the credits (four after a special waiver was granted), Piller agreed to not feature his name in the credits. A partial first draft was submitted on November 30 so that preproduction for the episode could commence. The altered timeline provided a chance to show the Enterprise crew in a much more dramatic and human light than would be allowable in a normal episode. Behr explained that since the original timeline was to be restored, the writers had the freedom to include more action. "Even though it was an alternate universe, [Moore] and I got all excited because we realized we were going to kill everyone on screen", he said. Michael Okuda and Rick Sternbach submitted technical memos regarding the type of anomaly that might drag the Enterprise-C through time, and suggested interstellar, super-dense strings as a possibility. The first draft teleplay was completed by December 4, and a preproduction meeting was held the same day. Given the scale of the story, various departments argued over costs and what items could be cut to reduce the budget. The final draft was finished and submitted on December 8.

=== Design ===
The studio decided to increase the episode's budget, which at that time was estimated by Daily Variety as $1.2 million per episode. This gave the production departments more leeway. One reason for the increase was that "Yesterday's Enterprise" would air during February sweeps, an important time for the studio to attract solid ratings. As The Next Generation was syndicated directly by the studio, the episode's performance would affect advertising revenue for the future.

The Enterprise-C emerges from a temporal rift; the ship was designed to be the logical link between the Excelsior- and Galaxy-class starship design.

The script called for the creation of the Enterprise-C. In the first season, illustrator Andrew Probert – who had designed the Enterprise-D – was interested in a display of the design lineage of the ship from James T. Kirk's Enterprise to The Next Generation's much larger ship, which was realized as a wall relief in the conference lounge behind the command bridge. Like most others, Probert assumed that the Enterprise-B was an Excelsior-class vessel and reasoned that the C would share design elements with its Excelsior-class predecessor and its Galaxy-class successor, Picard's ship. During this lineage project, Probert also produced a small color sketch of his version of Enterprise-C, but he left at the end of the season and his absence meant that no one knew what the drawing was intended to be.

When Rick Sternbach took over Probert's duties, he believed the sketch was a rejected concept for the Enterprise-D, but the ship's design stayed with him. When he learned about the ship requirement for "Yesterday's Enterprise", he followed a thought process similar to Probert and built off the old sketch. Probert's version had a highly curved engineering hull reminiscent of a sailing ship, but Sternbach was worried that a design with so many compound curves would prove difficult to fabricate in the available time, so he made the hull entirely circular. A set of orthographic views was created and sent to Greg Jein, who fabricated the shooting model, which cost more than $10,000 to produce. The model was modified to appear as various Ambassador-class starships in later Next Generation episodes, with its saucer and nacelles spaced apart to create a larger ship.

The production crew took several steps to differentiate the alternate universe from the original one. In addition to the absence of a counselor, a "military log" was substituted for a captain's log and a "combat date" was used rather than stardate. The expanded budget allowed the bridge to be entirely redressed, something that would normally be infeasible. Steps replaced ramps on the bridge, and the captain's chair was elevated and made more throne-like. Longer, spartan tables were also substituted for the usual decor in the Ten-Forward lounge. While enlisted crew aboard the darker Enterprise wore variations of the Season 1–2 uniforms, the senior officers wore slightly modified versions of the uniforms introduced in Season 3. The Enterprise-C officers wore costumes from earlier Star Trek feature films due to the expense and time-consuming nature of creating more than a half-dozen or so new uniforms for the episode. Costume designer Robert Blackman's solution to change their appearance was to remove the turtleneck collars underneath the red tunics, as well as the belts, although the rear belt loop remained.

=== Filming and casting ===
Filming began on Monday, December 11, 1989, and lasted for seven days. The episode was directed by David Carson, who had only filmed one other Next Generation episode before "Yesterday's Enterprise". Carson felt that his relative lack of experience helped because he had no preconceptions about how episodes should be directed. Since much of the episode took place in the darker alternate universe, Carson wanted to emphasize the toll that decades of war had taken on the crew and the bridge. "Picard really looked tired and worn and like a battle-weary commander, and that's what we wanted the bridge to look like—a battle weary bridge. I had lots of thoughts about making it as strong as possible using a lot of low lights, a lot of dark blues, making it very much more moody", he said. To heighten the impact of the physical set changes, Carson took a different approach to how he constructed shots. "It was my intention to make it as much like a submarine as possible and to use low-angle lighting; basically, to do everything the opposite way that the Enterprise was normally shot." The cameras were equipped with longer lenses than usual in order to reduce the depth of the scenes and provide a grittier feel. The use of low angles forced the lighting to be modified to prevent the scene from, in Carson's words, looking "like a hotel lobby".

Two new roles – Garrett and Castillo – needed to be filled for the production. The actors selected were both Star Trek fans. Christopher McDonald was picked for Castillo. "What impressed me about [McDonald]", Carson remembers, "was that he wasn't just your romantic leading man; he was actually a very impressive actor." Tricia O'Neil was cast for similar reasons; the actress was not the normal Star Trek commander type. Carson was also pleased to work with Crosby and Goldberg. The main cast enjoyed the opportunity to play their characters differently. The unusual degree of friction between characters provoked some concern with the producers. Berman, for example, was afraid that the episode was pushing the alternate timeline too far.

Ganino and Stillwell visited the set frequently during filming. Members of the main cast approached Stillwell with questions about the nature of the altered universe, trying to determine if they were still playing the same characters. Goldberg asked Ganino about changing a piece of dialogue on set, but since Ganino was not the author of the teleplay, he deferred to Stillwell, who in turn notified the production office. When Berman found out that Ganino and Stillwell were on set and talking to the actors, he banned them from setting foot on the sets again.

Many planned elements were never filmed, due to production time constraints. Moore had hoped for an extended battle scene in which Data would be electrocuted, and Wesley Crusher blown up in an explosion. Production of the episode ended on December 19.

== Release and reception ==
=== Broadcast ===
"Yesterday's Enterprise" was first broadcast the week of February 19, 1990. Because The Next Generation aired in syndication, "Yesterday's Enterprise" did not air on a specific day or time slot. The episode received a 13.1 Nielsen rating for the time period from February 19 to March 4 – the third highest rating for the series, and the highest for the entire season. While the season had averaged 9,817,000 households, "Yesterday's Enterprise" was viewed by 12,070,000 households.

=== Critical reception ===
The episode has been well received by reviewers. In a retrospective review, Zack Handlen of The A.V. Club praised the episode for quickly establishing the premise and stakes, as well as turning Tasha Yar's death into one of the episode's "strongest emotional beats ... Tasha's determination to die with meaning by the end of [the episode] transforms her from a misstep into something more noble and sad." In contrast, Tor Books' Keith DeCandido wrote that while the guest stars were excellent, Tasha Yar's return for a "TV death" is the episode's major flaw: "It is, in short, a scripted death, and you can see the marionette strings", he wrote. Film critic Jordan Hoffman wrote that the episode is "heavy, Philip K. Dick-ian stuff that actually takes some thought to follow and ... all victories come at a cost", and that it is a fan favorite episode for good reason. Likewise, Den of Geek reviewer James Hunt praised the episode for finding the human stakes in the story, elevating it above standard science fiction time travel stories.

Critic Marc Bernardin described the episode as Star Trek's "smartest time-travel experiment" and a fan favorite. Time magazine rated "Yesterday's Enterprise" as one of the top ten moments of Star Trek, including television series and films up to that time. They note the work of multiple writers on this episode, which they remark "polished the episode into a taut, unpredictable thriller with an exhilarating complement of phasers and photon torpedoes." The Toronto Star listed The Next Generation's time-shifting episodes, including "Yesterday's Enterprise", as one of the twenty best elements of the show, with Comic Book Resources ranking the episode the second-best time-travel episode in all of Star Trek. Fans attending the Star Trek 50th Anniversary convention in 2015 voted "Yesterday's Enterprise" the fifth-best episode of the franchise. The episode ranked as one of The Next Generation's top episodes in lists by Entertainment Weekly, The Hollywood Reporter, and Nerdist, and as one of the best Star Trek episodes of all time by Empire, IGN, and TV Guide. The episode is a favorite and influence to John Logan and Roberto Orci, writers for the film Star Trek: Nemesis (2002) and the reboot Star Trek (2009), respectively.

In 2016 SyFy ranked "Yesterday's Enterprise" as the No. 1 best time travel plot in Star Trek.

=== Home media release ===
The first home media release of "Yesterday's Enterprise" was on VHS cassette, appearing on July 11, 1995, in the United States and Canada. "Yesterday's Enterprise" was also included as one of four episodes (along with "The Best of Both Worlds, Parts I and II" and "The Measure of a Man") in a DVD collection entitled "The Best of Star Trek: The Next Generation". The episode was later included on the Star Trek: The Next Generation season three DVD box set, released in the United States on July 2, 2002. The first Blu-ray release was in the United States on April 30, 2013.

== See also ==
- Episode "Redemption", in which Sela, the daughter of Tasha Yar, is introduced
