= Booby Trap (Star Trek: The Next Generation) =

- Star Trek: The Next Generation episode
- Episode no.: Season 3 Episode 6
- Directed by: Gabrielle Beaumont
- Story by: Michael Wagner; Ron Roman
- Teleplay by: Ron Roman; Michael Piller; Richard Danus
- Cinematography by: Marvin V. Rush
- Production code: 154
- Original air date: October 30, 1989

Guest appearances
- Susan Gibney as Leah Brahms; Colm Meaney as Miles O'Brien; Whoopi Goldberg as Guinan; Albert Hall as Galek Dar; Julie Warner as Christy; Majel Barrett as Computer Voice

Episode chronology
← Previous "The Bonding"	Next → "The Enemy"
- Star Trek: The Next Generation season 3

"Booby Trap" is the sixth episode of the third season of the American science fiction television series Star Trek: The Next Generation, the 54th episode overall, first broadcast on October 30, 1989. It is the first episode of any Star Trek series to be directed by a woman.

Set in the 24th century, the series follows the adventures of the Starfleet crew of the Federation starship Enterprise-D, under the command of Captain Jean-Luc Picard. In this episode, the Enterprise discovers a derelict centuries-old alien battlecruiser, and becomes ensnared by the same trap that killed its crew.

Actress Susan Gibney guest stars as the spacecraft engineer Leah Brahms.

== Plot ==
While the Enterprise investigates the asteroid-laden sector of space of the final battle between the Menthars and the Promellians, it receives a distress call from a Promellian battlecruiser. They find the ancient battlecruiser adrift but intact, and Picard, anxious to see the ship for himself, joins the away team as they transport over. They find a recording by the Promellian captain that suggests the ship was caught in a Menthar trap. After the away team returns to the Enterprise, it begins to suffer a series of power losses that prevent the use of its engines, and is bombarded by radiation that threatens to drain its shields and kill the crew. Picard orders Chief Engineer Geordi La Forge to find a way to restore power, while a second away team searches for more clues on the Promellian vessel. They discover that the Menthars had used devices to absorb an enemy ship's energy and redirect it back as hazardous radiation, and that the Enterprise is stuck in the same trap.

La Forge realizes that he needs to reconfigure the warp drive, and traces the warp drive's design back to its construction blueprints, created by Dr. Leah Brahms. La Forge enters the ship's holodeck to reason through the engine reconfiguration, where the computer takes an idle remark by Geordi literally and creates a holographic representation of Brahms herself to assist him in his work. He asks the computer to update the hologram with Dr. Brahms' personality profile, and slowly gains romantic feelings for her. Eventually the simulated Dr. Brahms suggests a solution: to allow the computer to take control of the ship, allowing it to make rapid adjustments to compensate for the trap. La Forge proposes an alternate solution: to reduce the Enterprise's power output and maneuver it out of the field by manual control. Picard and La Forge decide that computers cannot account for human intuition and elect to go with the manual approach. Picard takes the helm himself to carry out the operation, successfully moving the Enterprise from the trap. Once free and with power restored, the Enterprise destroys the Promellian craft to prevent others from falling into the trap, and La Forge kisses the simulated Brahms goodbye before turning off the holodeck.

== Releases ==
The episode was released with Star Trek: The Next Generation season three DVD box set, released in the United States on July 2, 2002. This had 26 episodes of Season 3 on seven discs, with a Dolby Digital 5.1 audio track. It was released in high-definition Blu-ray in the United States on April 30, 2013.

This was released in Japan on LaserDisc on July 5, 1996, in the half season set Log. 5: Third Season Part.1 by CIC Video. This included episodes up to "A Matter of Perspective" on 12-inch double-sided optical discs. The video was in NTSC format with both English and Japanese audio tracks.

== Reception ==
Keith DeCandido gave the episode a rating of 4 out of 10 for Tor.com, writing "There’s a lot of good in this episode—Picard's archaeological geekiness, the simplicity of both the trap and the ultimate solution, the nobility of the Promellian captain, the whole ships-in-bottles bit", but found it impossible to rate highly due to the inherent creepiness in the premise of LaForge falling in love with a computer simulation of a real person.

In a review of this episode in 2010, The A.V. Club gave the episode a "B" grade, writing, "The big climax shifts entirely to Picard's shoulders, as he takes over the helm to pilot the Enterprise out of the debris field. It's the best part of the episode, and a comforting ... reminder that by now in the show's run, even when things threaten to go off course, there's always a steady hand to get us back on track.

Io9's 2014 listing of the top 100 Star Trek episodes placed "Booby Trap" as the 90th best episode of all series up to that time, out of over 700 episodes. In 2019, Comic Book Resources rated "Booby Trap" the 14th best 'holodeck' episode of the franchise.

In 2019, Den of Geek noted this episode for featuring romantic elements with Geordi.

In 2017, Popular Mechanics said that "Booby Trap" was one of the top ten most fun episodes of Star Trek: The Next Generation, noting that it has several unique plot concepts, including ancient space traps, falling in love with a hologram, and that technology may not solve all problems.

In 2020, ScreenRant noted this as a frightening episode of Star Trek, elaborating "... It ends in nail-biting, spectacular fashion." and conclude it has one of the best moments for Captain Picard (played by Patrick Stewart).

== See also ==
- "Galaxy's Child" - the fourth season episode where the real Leah Brahms comes aboard the Enterprise.
