= The Bonding =

- Star Trek: The Next Generation episode
- Episode no.: Season 3 Episode 5
- Directed by: Winrich Kolbe
- Written by: Ronald D. Moore
- Cinematography by: Marvin Rush
- Production code: 153
- Original air date: October 23, 1989

Guest appearances
- Susan Powell as Marla Aster; Gabriel Damon as Jeremy Aster; Colm Meaney as Miles O'Brien

Episode chronology
← Previous "Who Watches the Watchers"	Next → "Booby Trap"
- Star Trek: The Next Generation season 3

"The Bonding" is the fifth episode of the third season of the syndicated American science fiction television series Star Trek: The Next Generation, the 53rd episode overall, first broadcast on October 23, 1989.

Set in the 24th century, the series follows the adventures of the Starfleet crew of the Federation starship Enterprise-D. In this episode, an Enterprise crewmember is killed in a tragic accident, leaving a newly orphaned young son to deal with her death.

This was the first episode of Star Trek: The Next Generation written by Ronald D. Moore. Moore went on to contribute to dozens of other episodes, including the award winning finale, before moving on to develop numerous other successful science fiction television series.

== Plot ==
While investigating a planet once occupied by Koinonians, Security Chief Worf and members of the Enterprise away team trigger an ancient mine. They are transported to Sickbay, but Lieutenant Marla Aster is dead. As Captain Picard delivers the news of Marla's death to her son Jeremy, Wesley Crusher talks with Commander Riker about how Picard had delivered the news of his father's death to his mother and himself. Worf expresses his desire to make R'uustai, a Klingon bonding ritual with Jeremy, as they are both orphans and he believes he can help the boy recover emotionally, but Jeremy blames Worf for his mother's death.

The crew investigates the planet, discovering mines that were recently unearthed and exposed. They observe a beam of charged particles emanating from the surface headed towards the Enterprise, while Counselor Troi senses a new presence from the planet. In Jeremy's quarters, a physical manifestation of Marla appears, explaining that the crew mistakenly considered her dead and that she wants Jeremy to live on the planet. Troi and Worf follow the two preventing "Marla" from using the transporter to return to the planet. They return to Jeremy's quarters, which has the appearance of the Asters' home on Earth. Chief Engineer La Forge tunes the shields to stop the particle beam, causing "Marla" to disappear and the room returns to normal.

A filament rises from the planet, striking the Enterprise and disrupting the shields; "Marla" appears and takes Jeremy, intent on going to the transporter room. Picard contains "Marla" with force fields and talks to her. "Marla" explains that she is one of two races that once lived on the planet; her species, made from energy, watched the other physical species wipe themselves out from wars. Her people want to prevent more suffering caused by the remnants of the war, thus providing Jeremy with the illusion of his mother still being alive. Picard and Troi point out that dealing with death is part of the human condition. Wesley explains to Jeremy how he dealt with his father's death by confronting his initial anger at Picard. Jeremy expresses his anger towards Worf, but Troi points out they are both orphans with Worf adding that he was aided by humans after losing his parents. Jeremy decides to go with Worf. Realizing that Jeremy will be all right, the illusion of Marla disappears and the alien presence is no more.

Some time later, Worf and Jeremy undertake the R'uustai ritual.

== Workprint VHS discovery ==
In the early 2010s, a VHS cassette with workprint version of "The Bonding" was brought to the attention of CBS from a collector, but not in time for an extended version to be made. The workprint version had six minutes of additional scenes over the broadcast version.

== Releases ==
This was released in Japan on LaserDisc on July 5, 1996, in the half season set Log. 5: Third Season Part.1 by CIC Video. This included episodes up to "A Matter of Perspective" on 12-inch double sided optical discs. The video was in NTSC format with both English and Japanese audio tracks.

The episode was released with Star Trek: The Next Generation season three DVD box set, released in the United States on July 2, 2002. This had 26 episodes of Season 3 on seven discs, with a Dolby Digital 5.1 audio track. It was released in high-definition Blu-ray in the United States on April 30, 2013.

== Reception ==
In a review for The A.V. Club, Zack Handlen gave "The Bonding" a "B+" grade, noting that the themes in the episode would reappear in Moore's work on Battlestar Galactica.

== See also ==
- "Blood Oath" (Star Trek: Deep Space Nine) (also explores Klingon customs)
