= Episodic storytelling =

Genre of narrative

Episodic storytelling is a genre of narrative that is divided into a fixed set of episodes. Multiple episodes are usually grouped together into a series through a unifying story arc, with the option to view immediately (rather than waiting for the release of each episode). Episodes may not always contain the same characters, but each episode draws from a broader group of characters, or cast, all of whom exist in the same story world. It is one of the most common form of storytelling in television.

The term used in literature to refer to a body of written work (such as novels by Charles Dickens) that initially appears in installments, is traditionally referred to as serials. The genre has resurfaced in popularity due to the influence of new digital technologies, such as virtual reality and OTT services such as Netflix, Prime Video, Hulu, and YouTube Premium.

== See also ==
- Webserial
- Feuilleton
- Television series
