= The Enemy (Star Trek: The Next Generation) =

- Star Trek: The Next Generation episode
- Episode no.: Season 3 Episode 7
- Directed by: David Carson
- Written by: David Kemper; Michael Piller
- Cinematography by: Marvin Rush
- Production code: 155
- Original air date: November 6, 1989
- Running time: 45 minutes

Guest appearances
- John Snyder as Bochra; Andreas Katsulas as Tomalak; Colm Meaney as Miles O'Brien; Steven Rankin as Patahk

Episode chronology
← Previous "Booby Trap"	Next → "The Price"
- Star Trek: The Next Generation season 3

"The Enemy" is the seventh episode of the third season of the syndicated American science fiction television series Star Trek: The Next Generation, the 55th episode overall, first broadcast on November 6, 1989.

Set in the 24th century, the series follows the adventures of the Starfleet crew of the Federation starship Enterprise-D. In this episode, Lt. Cdr. Geordi La Forge (LeVar Burton) is trapped on an inhospitable planet hazardous to human life with a Romulan. The two adversaries must work together if they wish to survive. Aboard the Enterprise, Lt. Worf (Michael Dorn) is faced with a conflict between his duty as a Starfleet officer and his Klingon prejudice against Romulans, and Captain Picard (Patrick Stewart) must contend with a Romulan warbird intent on recovering their own personnel.

== Plot ==
The Enterprise responds to a Romulan distress signal coming from Galorndon Core, a planet near the Neutral Zone with severe radiologic storms that interfere with transporters and communications. Riker, Worf, and La Forge transport down through a window in the storms and discover wreckage of a Romulan craft on the hostile planet's surface. Worf finds a Romulan survivor near death and subdues him. While Riker and Worf take the Romulan back to the beacon for transport back to the ship, La Forge ends up falling into a hidden hole. Riker and Worf try to find him, but are forced to leave before the transport window in the storms closes. By the time Geordi has climbed out, it is impossible to communicate with the Enterprise.

Aboard the ship, Dr. Crusher tends to the Romulan, finds that he is also suffering severe neurological damage due to the planet's storms, and that she needs to locate a matching donor of a rare variety of ribosomes to keep him alive. When Captain Picard asks for suggestions on how to locate Geordi, Wesley Crusher offers the idea of launching a probe onto the planet's surface that would send a neutrino signal that could be detected by La Forge's VISOR, lead him to the probe, and allow him to use it to signal he is all right and able to return to the ship during the next storm window. As they launch and monitor the probe, the Enterprise detects a communication from Romulan Commander Tomalak. When they hail him to inform him that the Romulans violated the treaty by entering Federation space, he brushes it off as a misunderstanding and explains that the craft went off course due to a malfunction. Picard informs him that they found a survivor, and after getting assurances that the crashed craft only had the one occupant, agrees to meet Tomalak at the Neutral Zone to deliver the survivor. Several crew members suggest a more aggressive response, but Picard warns his crew that they must handle the situation delicately to avoid setting off another war between the Federation and Romulan Empire.

On the surface, La Forge discovers the probe's signal, but while following its guidance he is captured by Bochra, another Romulan survivor of the crash. Though Bochra holds La Forge hostage, he reveals that he is losing feeling in his legs from the crash, while Geordi notes he is starting to have problems seeing through his VISOR, leading him to conclude that the storms are causing neurological damage, upping the ante that they must get off the planet to survive. La Forge manages to convince him to take his chances with the Federation, but as they head out to the probe, Geordi succumbs to the neurological damage and is unable to see through his VISOR. Bochra suggests connecting the VISOR to the tri-corder using the combined technology to navigate to the probe, and the two work together to overcome their physical disabilities to make it there.

On the ship, Worf is found as the only suitable donor for the dying Romulan, but he refuses due to his grudge with the Romulan race for killing his parents. Picard urges Worf to put his duty to Starfleet over his honor as a Klingon, but it is all for naught when the Romulan, refusing treatment, succumbs to his wounds and dies. Tomalak, irate that the Enterprise wasn't at the designated waiting point at the agreed upon time, violates the treaty and appears in front of the Enterprise at the planet. Picard is forced to report that the Romulan crewman died, which infuriates Tomalak and he prepares his weapons to fire at the Enterprise. As the Enterprise raises its shields, they discover La Forge has reached the probe with another lifeform. Picard warns Tomalak they are lowering their shields to beam up the survivors directly to the bridge. When they arrive, Bochra reports to Tomalak that La Forge had helped save his life. Tomalak accepts this and stands down his weapons. Bochra cautiously thanks La Forge for his help and is returned to the Romulans, and the Enterprise escorts Tomalak's ship back to the Neutral Zone without further incident.

== Releases ==
On April 23, 1995, "The Price" and "The Enemy" were released on LaserDisc in the United States. This was released in Japan on LaserDisc on July 5, 1996, in the half season set Log. 5: Third Season Part.1 by CIC Video. This included episodes up to "A Matter of Perspective" on 12-inch double sided optical discs. The video was in NTSC format with both English and Japanese audio tracks. The episode was released with Star Trek: The Next Generation season three DVD box set, released in the United States on July 2, 2002. This had 26 episodes of Season 3 on seven discs, with a Dolby Digital 5.1 audio track. It was released in high-definition Blu-ray in the United States on April 30, 2013.

== Reception ==
This episode was noted as one of the top episodes about tolerance, in this case highlighting the tensions between the Romulans and the Federation.

Screen Rant ranked a character introduced in this episode, Bochra, as the 6th most important Romulan of the Star Trek Franchise.

SyFy recommended watching "The Enemy" as background on Romulan aliens for Star Trek: Picard.

== See also ==
- The Defiant Ones (1958 film about two escaped prisoners, one white and one black, who must co-operate in order to survive while being shackled together)
- Enemy Mine (1985 film featuring a stranded alien and human)
- Hell in the Pacific (1968 film featuring two World War II enemy soldiers stranded on a Pacific island)
