= Who Watches the Watchers =

- Star Trek: The Next Generation episode
- Episode no.: Season 3 Episode 4
- Directed by: Robert Wiemer
- Written by: Richard Manning; Hans Beimler
- Cinematography by: Marvin V. Rush
- Production code: 152
- Original air date: October 16, 1989

Guest appearances
- Kathryn Leigh Scott as Nuria; Ray Wise as Liko; James Greene as Barron; Pamela Segall as Oji; John McLiam as Fento; James McIntire as Hali; Lois Hall as Warren

Episode chronology
← Previous "The Survivors"	Next → "The Bonding"
- Star Trek: The Next Generation season 3

"Who Watches the Watchers" is the fourth episode of the third season of the American science fiction television series Star Trek: The Next Generation, the 52nd episode overall, first broadcast on October 16, 1989.

Set in the 24th century, the series follows the adventures of the Starfleet crew of the Federation starship Enterprise-D. In this episode, the Enterprise must undo the damage when a primitive civilization discovers a Federation observation team and concludes that the Starfleet personnel are gods.

The episode title is a translation of the Latin phrase "Quis custodiet ipsos custodes?"

== Plot ==
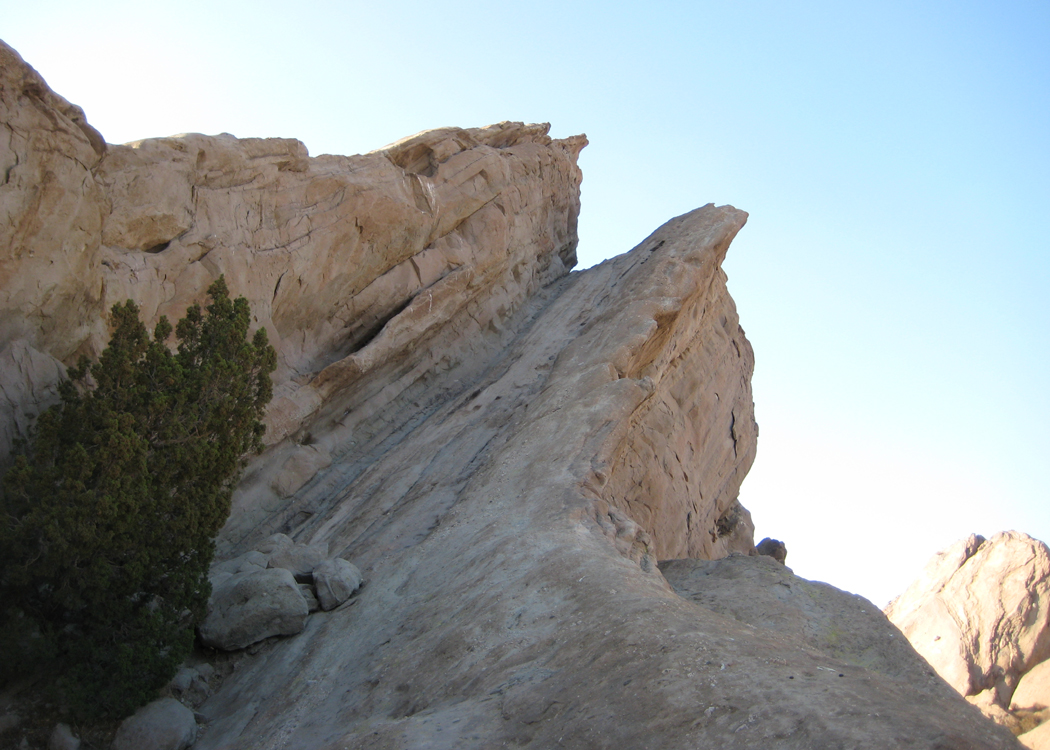
Part of the area of Vasquez Rocks, used for filming the Mintaka III surface scenes. Also used for the Vulcan surface scenes in The Voyage Home

The Federation starship Enterprise, under the command of Captain Jean-Luc Picard, arrives at the planet Mintaka III to resupply and repair a Federation outpost being used to monitor the Mintakan people, a proto-Vulcan race near a Bronze Age level of cultural development. The outpost is built into the side of a cliff and camouflaged by a holographic projection of a rockface.

As the Enterprise provides assistance, the projector malfunctions and the outpost becomes fully visible. Liko, a Mintakan, sees it and attempts to approach, but suffers an electrical shock that causes him to fall off the cliff and sustain critical injuries. When Chief Medical Officer Dr. Crusher rushes to provide aid, she realizes the injuries are too severe to treat at the scene and has him transported to the Enterprise for treatment despite the action violating the Prime Directive. Liko becomes conscious and witnesses everything occurring around him, and focuses on Picard giving instructions. Dr. Crusher is able to heal Liko and attempts to wipe his memory of the incident before returning him to the planet. First Officer Riker suggests that he and Counselor Troi disguise themselves as Mintakans in order to search for Palmer, a missing member of the anthropological team, and to monitor Liko, to make sure the memory wipe worked. They discover to their horror that it did not, as Liko recalls an image of "the Picard", and has convinced other Mintakans that the Picard must be their god.

Troi and Riker subtly try to dispel the myth of the Picard, which gains traction until a hunting party arrives with a delirious Palmer in tow. While Troi provides a diversion, telling the clan that another "like Palmer" is heading for the caves, Riker ties up an elderly man who was left behind to keep an eye on Palmer; he and Palmer flee the area and escape back to the Enterprise. The Mintakans capture Troi and consider killing her to mollify the Picard, leaving Picard to take steps to rectify the situation without further violation of the Prime Directive. He transports Nuria, the leader of the village where Troi is being held, to the Enterprise and attempts to show her that he and the rest of the crew are mortal, including having her witness the death of a crewman in Sickbay.

Picard returns with Nuria to the surface in the middle of a thunderstorm, which Liko has taken as a sign of the Picard's anger. Nuria attempts to reason with Liko, but he demands first-hand proof of Picard's mortality and aims at him with a bow and arrow. Picard insists that Liko should shoot if the only evidence he will accept is Picard's death. Liko fires, but his daughter shoves him so that he only wounds Picard; seeing him fall and bleed, Liko and the others come to accept that Picard is not a god. Picard and Troi return to the Enterprise, and after he is treated, Picard returns to the surface one last time, and explains to the Mintakans that the Federation will remove the outpost and allow them to develop on their own. Before Picard leaves, Nuria gives him a Mintakan tapestry as a gift.

== Reception ==
The A.V. Club gave the episode a grade A.

In 2017, Den of Geek included "Who Watches the Watchers" as one of their 25 recommended episode watches of Star Trek: The Next Generation. In 2019, they suggested it was one of five episodes that had a higher degree of watch repeatability, and had a focus on the character Captain Picard (played by Patrick Stewart).

WIRED magazine rated "Who Watches the Watchers" as one of the best of Star Trek: The Next Generation in a 2012 review, for what it called science fiction optimism. They note the title's origins in the Latin phrase, "Quis custodiet ipsos custodes?", attributed to Roman poet Juvenal.

In 2019, Den of Geek recommended rewatching this episode as background for Star Trek: Picard.

In 2020, ScreenRant noted this episode as having an important moral message.

In 2021, Nerdist said this was one of the top ten Star Trek episodes with first alien contact, praising how the Enterprise D crew struggles with the prime directive as it becomes embroiled with an encounter with the pre-warp Mintakans.

== Releases ==
On March 21, 1995, "The Survivors" and "Who Watches the Watchers" were released on LaserDisc in the United States.

In Japan its LaserDisc release came on July 5, 1996, in the half season set Log. 5: Third Season Part.1 by CIC Video. This included episodes up to "A Matter of Perspective" on 12-inch double sided optical discs. The video was in NTSC format with both English and Japanese audio tracks.

The episode was released with Star Trek: The Next Generation season three DVD box set, released in the United States on July 2, 2002. This had 26 episodes of Season 3 on seven discs, with a Dolby Digital 5.1 audio track. It was released in high-definition Blu-ray in the United States on April 30, 2013.

== See also ==
- "The Drumhead" – a fourth season episode in which events of this episode are used in an attempt to smear Captain Picard's reputation and brand him as a traitor.
