= The Survivors (Star Trek: The Next Generation) =

- Star Trek: The Next Generation episode
- Episode no.: Season 3 Episode 3
- Directed by: Les Landau
- Written by: Michael Wagner
- Cinematography by: Marvin V. Rush
- Production code: 151
- Original air date: October 9, 1989

Guest appearances
- John Anderson as Kevin Uxbridge; Anne Haney as Rishon Uxbridge

Episode chronology
← Previous "The Ensigns of Command"	Next → "Who Watches the Watchers"
- Star Trek: The Next Generation season 3

"The Survivors" is the third episode of the third season of the American science fiction television series Star Trek: The Next Generation, the 51st episode overall, first broadcast on October 9, 1989.

Set in the 24th century, the series follows the adventures of the Starfleet crew of the Federation starship Enterprise-D. In this episode, the Enterprise reaches a Federation colony where all but two of the 11,000 inhabitants have been killed by a mysterious attacker. The two survivors, Kevin and Rishon Uxbridge, an elderly couple (played by John Anderson and Anne Haney), refuse assistance and do not want to be rescued. The crew of the Enterprise must determine why only two survivors remain on an otherwise obliterated planet.

== Plot ==
The Federation starship Enterprise-D, under the command of Captain Jean-Luc Picard, responds to a distress call from a Federation colony on Delta Rana IV and discovers the planet to be devastated and devoid of life, save for a patch of land containing a house and vegetation. Transporting to the surface, the away team meets the human occupants of the house, Kevin and Rishon Uxbridge, who claim to have witnessed the attack that destroyed the colony, but are unaware that they are the only survivors. The team, finding nothing of interest save for a small music box, insists that the Uxbridges return to the Enterprise for safety, but they refuse. Aboard the Enterprise, Counselor Troi begins to hear the music from the music box in her mind constantly, each repetition slightly louder than the last, which eventually reduces her to screaming hysterics. Dr. Crusher is forced to place her in an induced coma.

An unknown spacecraft appears and attacks the Enterprise, then flees. The Enterprise gives chase but is unable to overtake the spaceship; eventually Captain Picard orders the Enterprise to return to the planet. Picard transports to the surface personally; Kevin suggests they were spared because they are pacifists. Upon the away team's return, the spaceship appears in orbit again, but Picard orders the Enterprise to leave the system first, believing that the crew is being toyed with.

Returning to the planet again, Picard transports to the surface to plead with the Uxbridges to leave with him. After being refused again, Picard tells them the Enterprise will remain to protect them as long as they live, and returns to the ship. The alien spaceship appears again and destroys the Uxbridges' home. Picard orders an attack on the craft, and unlike the previous encounters, easily destroys it. Playing on a suspicion, Picard has the Enterprise move to a higher orbit; after a short time, the Uxbridges' home reappears.

Picard orders the Uxbridges beamed up to the Enterprise and confronts Kevin with his suspicions: Kevin and Rishon's house was destroyed in the attack and Rishon was killed, but Kevin, who is not human, has recreated them both, and created the alien warship to dissuade the Enterprise from investigating. Kevin admits the truth, and the illusory Rishon disappears. He removes the torturous music that he had placed in Troi's mind to prevent her from telepathically identifying him.

Kevin reveals that he is a Douwd, an immortal energy being with vast powers, who fell in love with Rishon and settled with her on Rana IV. When the planet was attacked by an aggressive, destructive species called the Husnock, he refused to join the fight in accordance with his species' pacifism. Rishon, however, died defending the colony. Stricken with grief, Kevin lashed out with his vast powers and wiped out the entire Husnock species—over 50 billion. Horrified by his crime, he chose self-exile to the planet, creating the replicas of Rishon and their house to spend the rest of eternity. Picard states that they are not qualified to be his judge, having no laws to fit his crime. The Enterprise leaves Kevin and his illusion in peace. Picard later opines in his log that a being as powerful as Kevin is best left alone.

== Reception ==
In Cleveland.com's ranking of the 25 of the greatest episodes of Star Trek prior to Star Trek: Discovery, this episode, "Survivors" was ranked as the 24th best of Star Trek.

== Releases ==
On March 21, 1995 "The Survivors" and "Who Watches the Watchers" were released on LaserDisc in the United States.

This was released in Japan on LaserDisc on July 5, 1996, in the half season set Log. 5: Third Season Part.1 by CIC Video. This included episodes up to "A Matter of Perspective" on 12-inch double sided optical discs. The video was in NTSC format with both English and Japanese audio tracks.

The episode was released with Star Trek: The Next Generation season three DVD box set, released in the United States on July 2, 2002. This had 26 episodes of Season 3 on seven discs, with a Dolby Digital 5.1 audio track. It was released in high-definition Blu-ray in the United States on April 30, 2013.
