= David Carson (director) =

British director of television and film

- Born: England
- Occupations: Film and TV director

David Carson is a British director of television and film.

== Career ==
Carson's first work in directing was in the British theatre scene and on British television. He directed an episode of the British soap opera Coronation Street. Carson sought to move to the United States in order to work in the American film scene, and prior to travelling, his agent arranged an interview for him with the producers of Star Trek: The Next Generation. However, he had never heard of Star Trek, and at his agent's suggestion, he rented some videos in order to conduct research. Once in the United States, he met with Rick Berman and David Livingston and was hired to direct the episode "The Enemy".

The producers liked the different British style of directing and scene blocking that Carson brought to the set, as it was a style that the show had not previously used. He was subsequently brought back for another episode, but when he arrived for the first of eight days of preparation he was told that Whoopi Goldberg was available, and so they would like him to direct one of the scripts that she appeared in. This turned out to be "Yesterday's Enterprise", which was developed from an outline to script during the eight days of preparation prior to shooting. His other episodes of TNG included "The Next Phase" and the second part of "Redemption". He was approached by Rick Berman to direct the opening episode of Star Trek: Deep Space Nine, "Emissary". He later explained that there was some apprehension prior to the launch of the series because it was the first without Gene Roddenberry, the producer. Carson had to ensure that he stayed within the pilot's budget, and to deal with the differences between TNG and DS9 while ensuring that it appealed to the fans. His other Deep Space Nine episodes included "Dax", "Move Along Home" and "The Alternate".

Carson's final work for Star Trek was his first feature film, and the first film in which the TNG characters appeared, Star Trek Generations. During the making of the film, he fought for the death of James T. Kirk to be changed from the original scripted version as he felt that it was "ignominious". Following the poor scores the scene received at public test screenings, the ending was re-written and Carson led the re-filming at the original location. His directing work on Generations inspired cast member Jonathan Frakes to seek to direct the following Star Trek movie, Star Trek: First Contact.

After his work on the Star Trek franchise, he worked on the miniseries The 10th Kingdom, as well as shows such as Smallville and One Tree Hill. Whilst on The 10th Kingdom, he worked alongside fellow director Herbert Wise as the series was filmed for six days a week for six months. He returned to his homeland in 2000, to film In His Life: The John Lennon Story. In 2002, he directed an adaptation of Stephen King's novel Carrie. During the same year, he was also executive producer for the pilot of Odyssey 5, which had been written by Manny Coto, former showrunner of Star Trek: Enterprise.

== Personal life ==
In 1981, Carson married the actress Kim Braden. They have two children.

== Filmography ==
Film

- Star Trek Generations (1994)
- Letters from a Killer (1998)
- Unstoppable (2004)

TV movies

Year	Title	Director	Co-Producer
1993	Shameful Secrets	Yes	No
1998	Man Made	Yes	No
2000	In His Life: The John Lennon Story	Yes	Yes
2000	Celebrity	Yes	No
2002	Carrie	Yes	Yes
2007	Blue Smoke	Yes	No

TV series

Year	Title	Notes
1981-1986	Coronation Street	21 episodes
1982	Crown Court	6 episodes
1983	Studio	4 episodes
1984-1985	The Adventures of Sherlock Holmes	2 episodes
1985	Time for Murder	2 episodes
1985-1987	Bulman	2 episodes
1986	The Return of Sherlock Holmes	2 episodes
1986	Call Me Mister	Episode "The Carve Up"
1988	Bergerac	Episode "Crossed Swords"
1988	Bust	2 episodes
1989-1992	Star Trek: The Next Generation	4 episodes
1989-1990	Alien Nation	2 episodes
1989-1991	L.A. Law	4 episodes
1990	The Trials of Rosie O'Neill	Episode "So Long Patrick"
1990-1991	Northern Exposure	3 episodes
1990-1993	Doogie Howser, M.D.	4 episodes
1991	WIOU	Episode "Ode to Sizzling Sal"
1991	Sons and Daughters	Episode "Where's Poppa?"
1991	Life Goes On	Episode "Loaded Question"
1991-1992	Homefront	4 episodes
1992	Sisters	Episode "Heart and Soul"
1992	Beverly Hills, 90210	2 episodes
1993	Southbeach	Episode "Diamond in the Rough"
1993-1994	Star Trek: Deep Space Nine	4 episodes
1995	Strange Luck	Episode "Soul Survivor"
1998	From the Earth to the Moon	Episode "Galileo Was Right"
1998	LA Doctors	2 episodes
1998	Nash Bridges	Episode "Imposters"
1998	Martial Law	Episode "Extreme Measures"
2000	The 10th Kingdom	Miniseries
2002	Witchblade	Episode "Destiny"
2002	Odyssey 5	Episode "Pilot"
2002-2004	Smallville	3 episodes
2003	Birds of Prey	Episode "Gladiatrix"
2003-2004	One Tree Hill	3 episodes
2004	Karen Sisco	Episode "No One's Girl"
2004	The Days	Episode "Day 1,375"
2006	Runaway	Episode "Mr. Radar Goes to Washington"
2007-2008	The Dresden Files	2 episodes (Also producer)
