= Mark Lenard =

American actor (1924–1996)

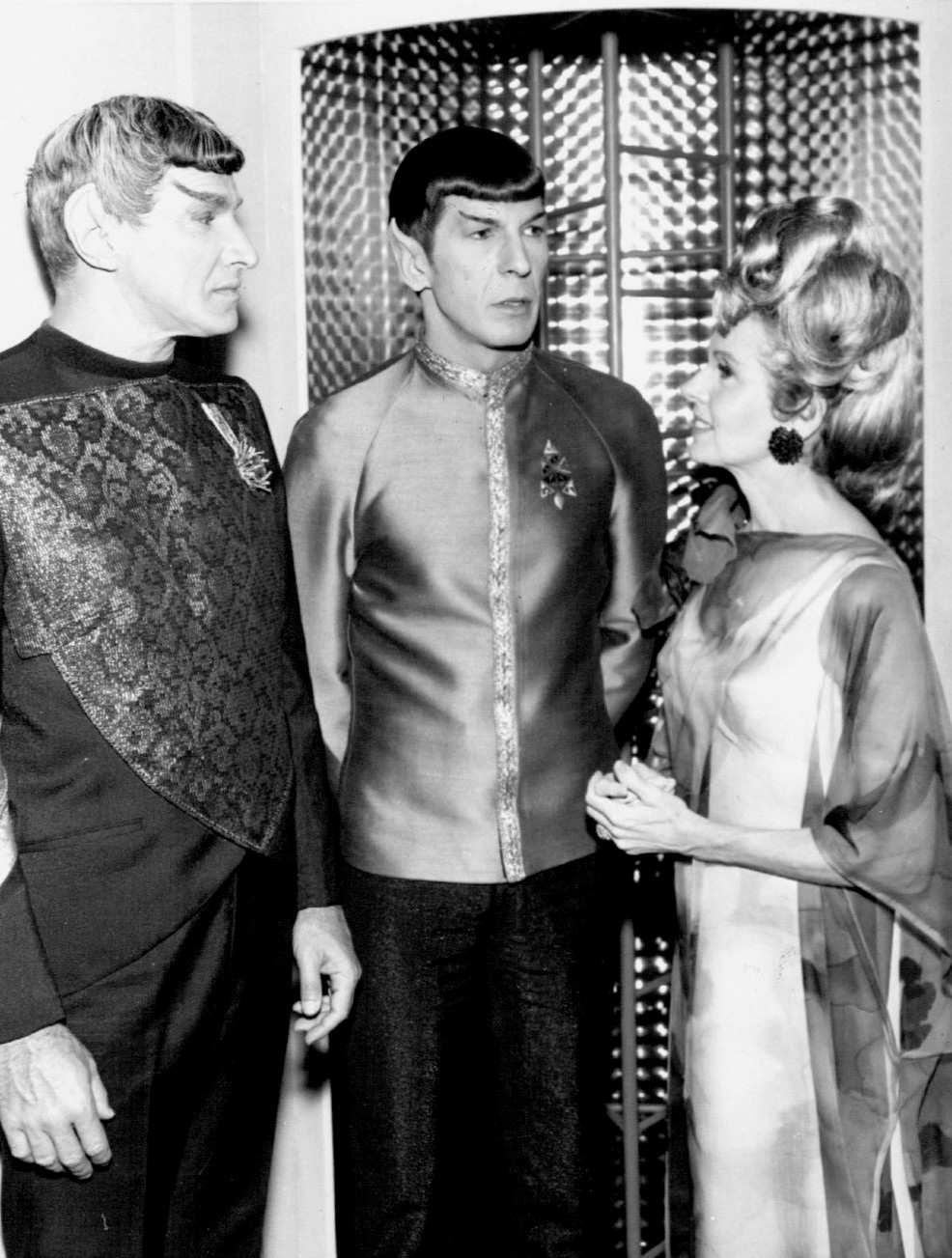
- Lenard (left) as Sarek
- Born: Leonard Rosenson; October 15, 1924; Chicago, Illinois, U.S.
- Died: November 22, 1996 (aged 72); New York City, New York
- Education: University of Michigan
- Occupations: Film, television actor
- Years active: 1951–1993
- Spouse: Ann Amouri (m. 1960)
- Children: 2

Mark Lenard (born Leonard Rosenson, October 15, 1924 – November 22, 1996) was an American actor, primarily in television. His most famous role was that of Sarek, father of Spock, in the science fiction Star Trek franchise, both in Star Trek: The Original Series and the animated series, in three films, and in two episodes of Star Trek: The Next Generation. He also played a Klingon in Star Trek: The Motion Picture, and a Romulan Commander in the episode "Balance of Terror" of the original series.

== Biography ==
Lenard was born in Chicago, the son of a Russian Jewish immigrant, Abraham, and his wife, Bessie, and was raised in the small town of South Haven, Michigan, on Lake Michigan, where his family owned a tourist resort. He joined the United States Army in 1943 and trained to be a paratrooper during World War II; he did not see combat, and was discharged in 1946 as a technical sergeant.

He got his start on stage while in the army. After earning a master's degree in theater and speech from the University of Michigan, he became known in New York City for serious drama, including the plays of Ibsen, Shaw, and Chekhov. His first noteworthy role was that of Conrad in John Gielgud's production of Much Ado About Nothing, followed by the Broadway show A Far Country. In the mid-1960s, he moved his family to Los Angeles, where he played the recurring role of Dr. Ernest Gregory in Another World, and one of the Three Wise Men in the biblical epic The Greatest Story Ever Told (1965).

Lenard is best known for his appearances in the Star Trek franchise, particularly in the role of Sarek, the father of Spock (Leonard Nimoy). His first Star Trek appearance was in the first season of Star Trek: The Original Series, however, playing the first Romulan ever seen in the series, in the episode "Balance of Terror" (1966). He originated the character of Sarek in the second-season episode "Journey to Babel" (1967), and provided the voice of Sarek in the Star Trek: The Animated Series episode "Yesteryear" (1973). He later played a Klingon Captain in Star Trek: The Motion Picture (1979), which gave him the distinction of being the first actor to play a Romulan, a Vulcan, and a Klingon in Star Trek. He reprised the role of Sarek in three of the Star Trek feature films—Star Trek III: The Search for Spock (1984), Star Trek IV: The Voyage Home (1986), and Star Trek VI: The Undiscovered Country (1991)—and provided the voice of young Sarek in a brief flashback sequence in Star Trek V: The Final Frontier (1989). Additionally, he appeared as the elderly Sarek in the third-season Star Trek: The Next Generation episode "Sarek" (1990) and the fifth-season episode "Unification: Part 1" (1991).

Lenard began acting in television series dramas and TV movies in 1955. He was the fifth actor to play Nathan Walsh in the soap opera Search for Tomorrow (1959–1960). He played Dr. Ernest Gregory in Another World (1964–1965). For two seasons Lenard played Aaron Stempel in the television series Here Come the Brides (1968–1970).

Lenard guest-starred in several episodes of the original Mission: Impossible from 1966 to 1970, including one with Leonard Nimoy, and in a two-part episode of Buck Rogers in the 25th Century. He played the prosecutor in Fort Grant in the Clint Eastwood film Hang 'Em High (1968), and the hostile gorilla Urko in the television series Planet of the Apes. He made a guest appearance on Little House on the Prairie, in the episode "Journey in the Spring, Part I", playing Peter Ingalls, older brother of Charles Ingalls. He had roles in Gunsmoke several times, including the episode "Nowhere to Run" (1968).

Lenard played a lead role in the film Noon Sunday, filmed on Guam with his costars Keye Luke; John Russell of the series Lawman; and character actor Stacy Harris. In The Radicals (1990), which recounted the beginnings of the Swiss Anabaptist movement in the 1520s, he played a composite historical character, Eberhard Hoffman, a Catholic bishop who serves as prosecutor in the trial of his former abbot Michael Sattler. In 1993, Lenard and fellow Star Trek actor Walter Koenig toured in a production of The Boys in Autumn. Lenard played a late middle-aged Huck Finn who re-encounters his childhood friend Tom Sawyer after a lifetime apart. Koenig played Sawyer.

Lenard died aged 72, of multiple myeloma in New York City.

== Filmography ==
=== Film ===
- The Greatest Story Ever Told (1965) - Balthazar
- Hang 'Em High (1968) - Prosecuting Attorney at Fort Grant
- Noon Sunday (1970) - Jason Cootes
- Annie Hall (1977) - Navy Officer
- Getting Married (1978) - Mr. Bloom
- Star Trek: The Motion Picture (1979) - Klingon Captain
- Star Trek III: The Search for Spock (1984) - Ambassador Sarek
- Star Trek IV: The Voyage Home (1986) - Ambassador Sarek
- Star Trek V: The Final Frontier (1989) - Ambassador Sarek (voice)
- The Radicals (1990) - Eberhard Hoffmann
- Star Trek VI: The Undiscovered Country (1991) - Ambassador Sarek

=== Television ===
- Studio One (1960) - David
- Search for Tomorrow (1959–1960) - Nathan Walsh
- Armstrong Circle Theatre: "Ghost Bomber: The Lady Be Good" (1960) - Major Bennett
- Family Classics: The Three Musketeers (1960) - Jusac De Rochefort
- Another World (1964–1965) - Dr. Ernest Gregory
- Mission: Impossible: "Wheels" (S1:E7, 1966) - Felipe Mora
- Star Trek: "Balance of Terror" (S1:E14, 1966) - Romulan Commander
- Star Trek: "Journey to Babel" (S2:E10, 1967) - Sarek
- Mission: Impossible: "Trek" (S2:E2, 1967) - Col. Luis Cardoza
- The Wild Wild West: "The Night of the Iron Fist" (S3:E14, 1967) - Count Draja
- Cimarron Strip: "The Greeners" (S1:E23, 1968) - Jared Arlyn
- Gunsmoke: "No Where to Run" (S13:E18, 1968) - Ira Stonecipher
- Here Come the Brides (1968–1970) - Aaron Stempel
- Mission: Impossible: "Nitro" (S3:E21, 1969) - Aristo Skora
- Hawaii Five-O: "To Hell with Babe Ruth" (1969) - Yoshio Nagata
- Mission: Impossible: "The Rebel" (1970) - Colonel Bakram
- Outrage: ABC Movie of the Week (1973) - Mr. Chandler
- Hawaii Five-O: "Will the Real Mr. Winkler Please Die" (S5:E19, 1973) - Rogloff
- The Rookies: "Life Robbery" (S1:E21, 1973) - Fred Cox
- Star Trek: The Animated Series: "Yesteryear" (1973) - Sarek (voice)
- Mannix: "Desert Run" (1973) - Hal Morgan
- Chopper One: "The Informer" (1974) - Assistant D.A. Jim Dugan
- Planet of the Apes (1974) - General Urko
- Hawaii Five-O: "Secret Witness" (1974) - Dan Bok
- Little House on the Prairie: "Journey in the Spring" (1976) - Peter Ingalls
- The Bob Newhart Show: "Carlin's New Suit" (1977) - Earl Stanley Plummer
- Hawaii Five-O: "You Don't See Many Pirates These Days" (1977) - Commander Hawkins
- The Secret Empire (TV series) (1979) - Emperor Thorval
- The Incredible Hulk (TV series) (1979) - Mr. Slater
- Buck Rogers in the 25th Century: "Journey to Oasis" (1981) - Ambassador Duvoe
- Otherworld "The Zone Troopers Build Men" (1985) - Perel Sightings
- Star Trek: The Next Generation: "Sarek" (1990) - Sarek
- Star Trek: The Next Generation: "Unification: Part 1" (1991) - Sarek
- In the Heat of the Night: "Legacy" (1993) - Horrace Sloan (final appearance)
- Amazing Space on TLC (1993)
