= Episode =

Part of a dramatic work such as a serial television or radio drama

An episode is any independently presented unit within a larger continuous work of dramatic, comedic, or documentary narrative, forming part of a series in media such as radio, television, film, or streaming media. Typically, each episode is published or delivered to the public in sequential, serial installments across weeks, months, or years (known as serialization for written narratives). The term frequently describes units of television or radio series that are broadcast separately. An episode is to a sequence as a chapter is to a book. Podcast series episodes typically run from 15 to 60 minutes.

== Etymology ==
The noun episode is derived from the Greek term epeisodion (Ancient Greek: ἐπεισόδιον); derived from roots meaning 'upon the entrance,' it referred to the entry of an actor onto the stage after a song had performed by a Greek chorus in Ancient Greek theatre. From this, it came to refer to a section of a larger work.

It is abbreviated as ep (plural eps).

== Narrative sub-units ==
Narrative sub-units of episodes are called segments, bounded by interstitials, such as commercials (Radio advertisements and Television advertisements), continuity announcements, or other segments not direct continuations of the prior segment.

Carpool Karaoke is a television show segment that is now a spin-off television series.

Stacking a show is a phrase newscast broadcasters use to describe putting segments together for a newscast episode.

== Other contexts ==
The noun episode can also refer to a part of a subject, such as an "episode of life" or an "episode of drama".

== See also ==
- Episodic storytelling
- Serial (radio and television)
- List of most-watched television episodes
