= The Devil's Heart =

1993 novel by Carmen Carter

- Front cover
- Author: Carmen Carter
- Audio read by: Gates McFadden
- Cover artist: Keith Birdsong
- Language: English
- Genre: Science fantasy
- Publisher: Pocket Books
- Publication date: 1 April 1993
- Pages: 320
- ISBN: 067179325X
- Preceded by: Imzadi
- Followed by: Dark Mirror

The Devil’s Heart is a 1993 science fantasy novel by Carmen Carter. It is a standalone Star Trek: The Next Generation novel published by Pocket Books, first released in hardback on 1 April 1993, in trade paperback on 1 February 1994, and as a Simon & Schuster audiobook narrated by Gates McFadden in April 1993.

Set during the fifth season of the TNG television series, the non-canon story primarily explores the consequences of Captain Jean-Luc Picard's brief possession of a legendary object of unsurpassed power and mystery.

The Devil's Heart reached number six on The New York Times Best Seller list on 4 April 1993, its second week on the list. It remained on the list for a total of four weeks.

== Plot summary ==
The USS Enterprise is en route to a scheduled maintenance check and shore leave destination when it is diverted by Starfleet to an archaeological site on a remote planet called Atropos to provide medical assistance. Upon arrival, the crew discovers that the research team has been murdered, with only one survivor: T’Sara, an elderly Vulcan archaeologist believed to be suffering from a life-threatening degenerative neurological illness.

Shortly after the Enterprise departs Atropos with T’Sara aboard, she dies, having revealed that she had recently discovered an artifact — known in a pre-Logical Vulcan dialect as the “Ko N’ya” — before it was stolen presumably by space pirates. Captain Jean-Luc Picard translates the term as “The Devil’s Heart” and informs his senior staff that T’Sara had long been known for being obsessed with confirming her controversial hypothesis: that a real object is the origin of recurring legends describing a “talisman of Darkness” found across the mythologies of disparate worlds throughout the Alpha Quadrant of the Milky Way Galaxy. These legends refer to it by various names, including the “Dream Gem” (Iconian), “Bloodstone” (Romulan), “Master of All Stories” (El-Aurian), “Telev's Bane” (Andorian), and “Pagrashtak” (Klingon).

The Enterprise then responds to an automated distress signal from a disabled Ferengi Marauder-class starship. An away team finds the vessel abandoned except for the corpse of its Ferengi captain, discovered clutching the artifact: a dull, rough rock [contrary to the illustration of a watermelon-size faceted ruby on the book jacket cover]. Picard takes custody of the Heart for safekeeping. Although the artifact has long been rumored to possess vast preternatural capabilities, including the ability to control minds, amass wealth and power, raise the dead, and even alter the flow of time itself, Lieutenant Commander Data’s analysis of its age and properties yields no conclusive results.

While in possession of the Heart, Picard begins to experience the memories of its previous possessors through vivid dreams, allowing him to witness events from pivotal moments in galactic history. Through these visions, he observes the artifact’s influence on multiple civilizations, including its role in the rise and fall of the Tkon Empire, its presence among the Iconians prior to their destruction, its involvement in early Vulcan history during the era of Surak, its transfer to Romulus, its use on Andoria to end a devastating plague, and its later appearance in Klingon society, where it inspires imperial conquest but ultimately ends up being used by a runaway royal maid to build an isolated art colony on Atropos. As Picard becomes increasingly affected by these experiences, his behavior grows uncharacteristically withdrawn and erratic, prompting concern among the senior staff.

News of the artifact’s rediscovery spreads, and several sapient species that previously possessed it attempt to intercept the Enterprise in order to reclaim it. Picard, convinced that the Heart has a will of its own and an unfulfilled purpose, resists these efforts and orders the ship to continue its course. His visions ultimately reveal that the artifact was created by an ancient, forgotten, highly advanced, long-extinct species as a seed meant to be sown in the soil of a planet in another galaxy, in order to reproduce the intelligent time portal entity known as the “Guardian of Forever.”

Acting on this revelation and a recently-acquired star map, Picard directs the Enterprise to a comet that heralds the unexpected appearance of an ephemeral wormhole leading to a distant galaxy. Transporter Chief Miles O'Brien is ordered to teleport the artifact into the wormhole, enabling it to continue its journey as a meteoroid. The ultimate destination and future development of the Devil’s Heart remain a mystery.

== Memorable quotes ==
“Captain, trust my objectivity, to my lack of emotion, when I tell you that the Heart is more of a danger to us than any attacking fleet. Give it up now, while you still can. If you rely on its power to protect us, we will be destroyed.”

— Data

== Reception ==
In 1993, Vicki Reynolds of The Lincoln Star wrote: "It is a mystery to me why the writers of Star Trek: The Next Generation don't occasionally make it easy for themselves and negotiate to use some of the plot elements devised in the entertaining series of original TNG novels. The latest, The Devil's Heart, is a case in point. It has all the wonderful things that make the TV series so enjoyable: suspense, a bit of mystery, complex character interaction, a tug between a good and evil and ethical dilemmas, temptation, a threat from an outside source, etc."

In 2010, Ann-Marie Cahill of Book Riot listed The Devil's Heart among the best Star Trek novels.

In 2019, Alex Perry of Trek Core wrote: "I remember of this book it unlocked my mind to what Star Trek fiction could be – telling great stories on a grander scale than televised Star Trek would ever be able to afford. The Devil’s Heart does exactly that."

== See also ==
Star Trek television episodes and novels featuring the Guardian of Forever :

- The City on the Edge of Forever (1967)
- Yesterday's Son (1983)
- Time for Yesterday (1988)
- Imzadi (1992)
- Terra Firma (Star Trek: Discovery) (2020)
