= Awakening (Star Trek: Enterprise) =

- Star Trek: Enterprise episode
- Episode no.: Season 4 Episode 8
- Directed by: Roxann Dawson
- Written by: André Bormanis
- Production code: 408
- Original air date: November 26, 2004

Guest appearances
- Robert Foxworth - Administrator V'Las; Gary Graham - Ambassador Soval; John Rubinstein - Minister Kuvak; Bruce Gray - Surak; Kara Zediker - T'Pau; Joanna Cassidy - T'Les

Episode chronology
← Previous "The Forge"	Next → "Kir'Shara"
- Star Trek: Enterprise season 4

"Awakening" is the eighth episode of the fourth season of the American science fiction television series Star Trek: Enterprise, and originally aired on November 26, 2004 on UPN. The script was written by André Bormanis and the episode was directed by Star Trek: Voyager alumna Roxann Dawson. The episode was the first of the season for both Bormanis and Dawson. The episode is the second of a three-part episode arc which started in "The Forge" and concludes in "Kir'Shara".

Set in the 22nd century, the series follows the adventures of the first Starfleet starship Enterprise, registration NX-01. In this episode, the Vulcan government seeks to make the Enterprise leave orbit so they can attack a renegade faction of Vulcans, and afterwards the long-standing enemy of the Vulcans, the Andorians. Meanwhile, Captain Jonathan Archer and Commander T'Pol have been captured by the Syrrannites, and it is discovered that Archer has the katra of Surak. He has visions which lead him to find an ancient Vulcan artifact called the "Kir'Shara" as the group come under attack from the Vulcans.

Elements of the plot of the episode were compared by executive producers to the Protestant Reformation with the Vulcan High Command representing the Catholic Church. The producers took care to cast actors in the roles of T'Pau and Surak who looked similar to the actors who portrayed those parts in The Original Series. Nielsen ratings for the first run of the episode saw a decrease from the first part of the trilogy, down to 1.8/3. The critical response was mixed, saying that whilst they were entertained by the episode, they had problems with some of the plot logic.

== Plot ==
Ambassador Soval is summoned before Administrator V'Las and the High Council to face punishment over his use of a mind meld. Since the act is widely considered to be criminal by the Vulcan authorities, Soval is summarily dismissed from the Ambassadorial service. Captain Archer and Commander T'Pol are questioned by the Syrrannites. Soon T'Pol is taken to see her mother, T'Les, and the two disagree about the tenets of the group — the Vulcan authorities call them extremists, a term T'Les disagrees with. Archer begins to see visions of an old Vulcan, and the dissidents determine that he had the katra of Surak transferred into him via mind meld.

V'Las, now largely unopposed on the Council, wants to end the Syrrannite threat once and for all. He postpones his plans to bombard the encampment, after delays in convincing Enterprise to leave orbit. He contacts Starfleet, and the Admiralty orders Commander Tucker to leave orbit but he refuses. He attempts, with assistance from Soval, to send a rescue shuttlepod to "The Forge", but they are intercepted by Vulcan patrol vessels. V'Las then orders Vulcan warships directly to engage Enterprise, and Soval suggests that they should retreat.

A ritual is performed to transfer the katra into the mind of T'Pau but it fails. Archer continues to see Surak, who informs him that he must find the relic known as the "Kir'Shara". The Vulcan military begin to bombard the complex. Archer, T'Pol, and T'Pau remain behind to search for the relic and Archer is able to use his knowledge to unlock a door to reveal it. As they leave, T'Pol finds her mother, but she dies after being seriously injured in the attack. On Enterprise, Soval reveals that the Vulcans, despite the recent peace accord, are preparing a surprise attack against the Andorians, and Tucker orders an immediate course at maximum warp.

== Production ==
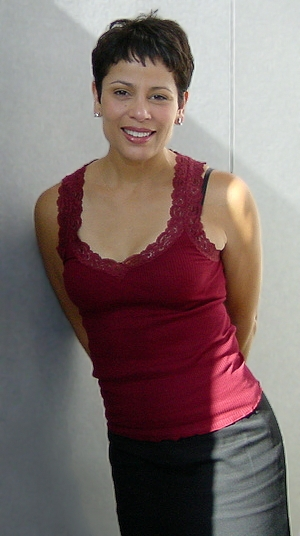
"Awakening" was the tenth and final episode of Enterprise to be directed by former Voyager actress Roxann Dawson

"Awakening" was the second part of a three-part trilogy of episodes during the fourth season of Enterprise that were created to deal with the differences between the Enterprise-era Vulcans and those seen in series set later in the timeframe of the franchise. Show runner Manny Coto summed up these differences saying, "Our Vulcans lie, our Vulcans are monolithic, our Vulcans are not pacifistic." He sought to introduce a situation which he compared to the 16th-century Protestant Reformation and wanted to include a Vulcan character who would effectively be in the role of Martin Luther, while the Vulcan High Command represented the Catholic Church.

The episode saw the re-casting of two roles which had previously appeared in episodes of The Original Series. These were the parts of T'Pau and Surak. T'Pau made her first appearance in "Amok Time", where she was played by Celia Lovsky. For "Awakening", Kara Zediker was cast in the role. Zediker had previously appeared in the first season of 24 as Elizabeth Nash. Surak had been played by Barry Atwater in "The Savage Curtain", but this role was taken by Bruce Gray for "Awakening". Gray had previously portrayed Admiral Chekote in The Next Generation episode "Gambit" and the Deep Space Nine episode "The Circle". For both of these parts, the producers attempted to cast actors who looked similar to the originals.

Robert Foxworth reprises his role from the first part of the trilogy as Administrator V'Las, and Joanna Cassidy had previously portrayed T'Les earlier in the season in the episode "Home". John Rubinstein, who appears in "Awakening" as Koval, has previously appeared as a Mazarite earlier in the series in the episode "Fallen Hero" and had appeared in "The 37's", an episode of Voyager. Foxworth had been friends with Joanna Cassidy for years, and they had played a married couple on Six Feet Under, but they did not share any scenes or meet on set. Gary Graham returned as Soval, who he has portrayed throughout the series from the pilot episode onwards. Director Roxann Dawson has previously portrayed B'Elanna Torres in Voyager, and "Awakening" marked the tenth episode of the series that she had directed. It was her only episode of season four, and her last on Enterprise. It was also writer André Bormanis' first episode of the season, who had previously written several episodes of the series as well as Voyager.

Filming started on September 23, 2004, and concentrated on Enterprise ship scenes on the standing sets for the first two days. After that production moved to the cave sets, which were dressed with Vulcan artifacts. On the fourth day of production, those artifacts were removed so that the same sets could use used to film the visions that Archer has of Surak. All exterior scenes in the Vulcan desert-like Forge were shot on a soundstage. The final day of filming took place on October 1, when all the scenes set in the Vulcan High Command were filmed. These involved only Foxworth, Graham and Rubinstein as well as a handful of extras.

== Reception ==
"Awakening" was first aired in the United States on UPN on November 26, 2004. The broadcast saw the episode come in fifth place during the timeslot, with a Nielsen rating of 1.8/3. This means that it was seen by 1.8 percent of all households, and three percent of all of those watching television at the time of the broadcast. It gained higher ratings than The WB, which aired re-runs of What I Like About You and Grounded for Life, but was behind the other four major networks with NBC's Dateline winning the hour with ratings of 5.9/11. The ratings received by Enterprise continued a downward trend in recent episodes, with ratings of 1.9/3 received by the previous episode.

Michelle Erica Green, reviewing the episode for TrekNation was undecided about whether the main point of the episode where Captain Archer is expected to lead the Vulcans back to their main path of logic was a "wonderfully progressive concept or just regressive Trek in which humans have all the answers". She thought that the change in Soval's opinions in this episode was difficult to accept and that the other members of the main cast didn't get a great deal to do in the episode. She thought that "Awakening" was a visual improvement over "The Forge", she was reserving judgement until she had seen the third part of the trilogy. Jamahl Epsicokhan at his website Jammer's Reviews thought that certain elements of the plot didn't follow logical paths, such as how Archer found the Kir'shara in a few minutes when apparently the Syrrannites had been looking for it for two years even though "it sits in a chamber behind a door that practically announces, 'IMPORTANT RELIC INSIDE'?" However, he called the episode entertaining and gave it a score of three out of four.

In 2018, Screen Rant praised casting actress Kara Zediker as the Vulcan character T'Pau.

== Home media ==
The first home media release of "The Forge" was in the season four DVD box set of Enterprise, originally released in the United States on November 1, 2005. The Blu-ray edition was released on April 1, 2014.
