= Sarek (novel) =

Novel by Ann C. Crispin

- US First printing cover
- Author: A. C. Crispin
- Cover artist: Keith Birdsong
- Language: English
- Genre: Science fiction
- Publisher: Pocket Books
- Publication date: 1 January 1994 (hardcover)
- Publication place: United States
- Media type: Print (Hardcover, Paperback)
- Pages: 448 (hardcover)
- ISBN: 0-671-79561-9 (hardcover)

Star Trek: Sarek is a novel by A. C. Crispin, set in the fictional Star Trek universe. It is set shortly after the motion picture Star Trek VI: The Undiscovered Country. Ambassador Sarek of Vulcan discovers evidence of a complicated plot to cripple the United Federation of Planets; he must work to find out who is behind it while also coming to terms with the death of his human wife, Amanda Grayson. A secondary storyline follows the adventures of Peter Kirk, nephew of James T. Kirk, who inadvertently becomes caught up in the enemy's schemes.

== Plot synopsis ==
Sarek discovers that leaders of the Federation and its enemies have been subjected to outside mental influence. He suspects that the interference is linked to the Freelans, a race which has been part of the Federation for decades, but which no offworlder has ever seen due to a cultural taboo. Sarek once inadvertently discovered that the Freelans look like Vulcans, but later dismissed the incident as a hallucination induced by the Pon farr. After secretly accessing the Freelan computer system, Sarek discovers that the Freelans are in fact Romulans, and that their Vulcan aides are the children of Vulcan spacefarers kidnapped by the Romulans and forced to reproduce. The Freelan ambassador Taryn is actually the Romulan wing commander in charge of the plot to spy on the Federation from within. The mental influencing of various leaders is carried out by the Vulcan aides, who were raised as Romulans without the telepathic ethics taught on Vulcan.

Sarek's work is interrupted by the news that his wife, Amanda, is terminally ill. Although he returns to Vulcan to be with her, he is soon called upon to negotiate for the release of a colony world held hostage by a Klingon renegade. He agrees, even though he will not be able to return before his wife's death. His son Spock, who believes his father's first duty is to the family, becomes angry when he learns of this decision, and the feud between them that ended in the episode "Journey to Babel" threatens to reassert itself. Sarek succeeds in the negotiations and discovers that the Klingon commander Keraz who led the raid is also a victim of the Romulans' mental influence.

When Sarek returns to Vulcan for Amanda's funeral, he shares his findings with Kirk, Spock, and Dr. Leonard McCoy, and Kirk agrees to take him to Freelan aboard the Enterprise. The Captain's own plans are to leave the ship to rescue his nephew Peter, a senior cadet at Starfleet Academy who has been kidnapped by the renegade Klingon Kamarag in order to lure Kirk into a trap. Kamarag, acting under the mental influence of the Freelans, is the leader of the renegade Klingons who defy the orders of the female Klingon Chancellor Azetbur. Peter is brought to the Klingon homeworld Qo'noS and placed in the care of Kamarag's niece Valdyr, who believes her uncle's actions are dishonorable but who is bound by her secondary status as a woman to follow his orders. She is impressed by Peter's bravery and strength when he overpowers several Klingon warriors in an attempt to break out, even after five days of starvation. Over the course of Peter's imprisonment, the two fall in love and eventually escape together. As they approach a Klingon spaceport intending to hijack a ship, they meet up with Kirk, Spock, and McCoy, who had intended to rescue the cadet. The five of them manage to steal a miniature Klingon Bird-of-Prey and escape back to the Enterprise.

A Romulan ship is discovered just inside the neutral zone, and Sarek realizes that ship must be under the command of Taryn. Sarek and Spock beam over to the Romulan ship in an attempt to acquire incontrovertible proof that the Romulans are involved. While attempting to forestall an attack against the Enterprise, Sarek accepts Taryn's challenge to an ancient form of duel that predates the division of the Vulcan and Romulan cultures. The duel is fought with the senapa, a curved sword with a poisoned blade. Sarek is cut and exposed to the poison but manages to win the duel despite Taryn's advantages of size and youth. Both men are beamed to the Enterprise where they are treated by Dr. McCoy.

With the help of the Romulan ship and a single Klingon ship that deserts the renegades, the Enterprise emerges victorious from a conflict with Kamarag's fleet. War between the Federation and the Klingon Empire is averted and the Romulan plot is foiled.

Peter is required to complete the Kobayashi Maru simulation test upon his return to the Academy, since he missed taking it with the rest of his class. Despite engineering a better-than-usual solution to the scenario, Peter decides to leave Starfleet for the diplomatic corps instead.

== Background ==
The novel explores the history of Sarek's relationship with Amanda through the device of select entries in Amanda's journal, which prompt flashbacks in the mind of the character reading them.

When Sarek tells Spock about his one face-to-face encounter with a Freelan, he mentions that the face he saw greatly resembled his own. Spock then describes his own first glimpse of a Romulan, which took place during the episode "Balance of Terror." He mentions that the Romulan Commander encountered by the Enterprise also strongly resembled Sarek. This is something of an inside joke, referring to the fact that the role of the Romulan Commander in "Balance of Terror" and the role of Sarek were both played by the actor Mark Lenard.

Peter Kirk, who first appeared as a child in the episode "Operation -- Annihilate!", is fully developed as an adult character in this novel.

The deadly weapon "senapa" was invented by the author.

Early in the novel, the author describes the interior of Sarek and Amanda's home. One of the paintings on the wall is of an icy world with a large, red sun. This seems to be an intentional reference to a painting described in Crispin's first novel, Yesterday's Son.

Parts of the novel's plot provide a setup for events that occur in Star Trek: The Next Generation.

Crispin was inspired by Star Trek: The Next Generation and decided to do something she had never done before, and submitted a treatment for a teleplay, after the editors at Pocket Books had requested all writers to write stories set in that era. The story was about an ancient artifact that was causing a certain area of space to become a sort of outer-space Sargasso Sea where ships would become mired and unable to escape. Having written the teleplay treatment Crispin decided to convert it into a full novel. Crispin had met actor Mark Lenard many times at Star Trek conventions, and while discussing his character Sarek he suggested "Why don't you write a novel that tells Sarek's story?" which also served as further inspiration to write the novel and pitch it to her editor. Lenard later told her he had read and liked the book.

== Reception ==
In their review, Publishers Weekly said that Crispin "packed everything a diehard Trekkie could want" into the book.

Ellen Cheeseman-Meyer of Tor.com compared the book to a glass of wine: "Sarek is the Star Trek novel equivalent of a glass of Riesling—sweet and light, but indisputably grown up." She praised Crispin and said "her contributions to the Star Trek universe are legion. Sarek was one of her more significant works. I highly recommend it."
