= Sarek (disambiguation) =

Sarek is a Vulcan character in the Star Trek fictional universe.

Sarek may also refer to:

- Sarek National Park, a national park in Jokkmokk Municipality in northern Sweden
- Sarek (Star Trek novel), a novel by A. C. Crispin
- "Sarek" (Star Trek: The Next Generation), episode 23 from the third season of Star Trek: The Next Generation
- Sarek (band), a Swedish folk/pop band

== See also ==
- Sarektjåkkå
