= Pluralism (political philosophy) =

Recognition and affirmation of diversity and coexistence within a political body

Pluralism is a political philosophy that holds that diversity within a political body allows different interests, convictions, ideologies, and lifestyles to coexist peacefully. While not all political pluralists advocate for a pluralist democracy, this is the most common stance, because democracy is often viewed as the fairest and most effective way to balance discrete values.

== Characteristics ==
Pluralism tries to encourage members of society to accommodate their differences by avoiding extremism (adhering solely to one value, or at the very least refusing to recognize others as legitimate) and engaging in good faith dialogue. Pluralists also seek the construction or reform of social institutions in order to reflect and balance competing principles.

Political theorist Isaiah Berlin, a strong supporter of pluralism, wrote: "let us have the courage of our admitted ignorance, of our doubts and uncertainties. At least we can try to discover what others ... require, by ... making it possible for ourselves to know men as they truly are, by listening to them carefully and sympathetically, and understanding them and their lives and their needs..."

One of the more famous arguments for institutional pluralism came from James Madison in The Federalist paper number 10. Madison feared that factionalism would lead to in-fighting in the new American republic and devotes this paper to questioning how best to avoid such an occurrence. He posits that to avoid factionalism, it is best to allow many competing factions (advocating different primary principles) to prevent any one from dominating the political system. This relies, to a degree, on a series of disturbances changing the influences of groups so as to avoid institutional dominance and ensure competition.

Like Edmund Burke, this view concerns itself with balance, and subordinating any single abstract principle to a plurality or realistic harmony of interests. Pluralism recognizes that certain conditions may make good-faith negotiation impossible, and therefore also focuses on what institutional structures can best modify or prevent such a situation. Pluralism advocates institutional design in keeping with a form of pragmatic realism here, with the preliminary adoption of suitable existing socio-historical structures where necessary. One of the problems plaguing any discussion of pluralism is that it is a multi-faceted concept. There are at least four distinct ways in which the term pluralism has been used.

William E. Connolly challenges older theories of pluralism by arguing for pluralization as a goal rather than as a state of affairs. Connolly's argument for the "multiplication of factions" follows James Madison's logic in engaging groups, constituencies, and voters at both the micro and macro level. Essentially, he has shifted the theory from a conservative theory of order, to a progressive theory of democratic contestation and engagement. Connolly introduces the distinction between pluralism and pluralization. Pluralism, whether the interest-group pluralism of Robert A. Dahl or political liberalism's "reasonable" pluralism, is oriented towards existing diversity of groups, values, and identities competing for political representation. Pluralization, by contrast, names the emergence of new interests, identities, values, and differences raising claims to representation not currently legible within the existing pluralist imaginary.

== The common good ==
Pluralism is connected with the hope that this process of conflict and dialogue will result in a quasi-common good. This common good is not an abstract value or set in stone, however, but an attempt at balancing competing social interests and will thus constantly shift given present social conditions. Proponents in the contemporary political philosophy of such a view include Isaiah Berlin, Stuart Hampshire and Bernard Williams. An earlier version of political pluralism was a strong current in the formation of modern social democracy (to balance socialist and capitalist ideals), with theorists such as the early Harold Laski and G. D. H. Cole, as well as other leading members of the British Fabian Society. In the United States, President Dwight Eisenhower's "middle way" was arguably motivated by a belief in political pluralism.

While advocated by many pluralists, pluralism need not embrace social democracy given it does not a priori assume a desirable political system. Rather, pluralists advocate one based on the pre-existing traditions and cognizable interests of a given society, and the political structure most likely to harmonize these factors. Thus, pluralists have also included Michael Oakeshott and John Kekes, proponents of something close to liberal conservatism (although will often reject such political labels). What pluralists certainly do have in common is the notion that a single vision or ideological schema, whether Marxism or unbridled neoliberalism, is likely too simplistic and rigid to advocate human beings' natural plurality of values. Pluralists likewise reject historicism and utopian thinking. While some, like John N. Gray, repudiate historical progress altogether, others, like Edmund Burke, indicate that human progress has occurred, as a function of improved social harmony.

== Conditions ==
For pluralism to function and to be successful in defining the common good, all groups have to agree to a minimal consensus that shared values are at least worth pursuing. The most important baseline value is thus that of mutual respect, understanding or tolerance. If no such dialogue is possible, extremism and physical coercion are likely inevitable.

== Notable pluralists ==
Listed alphabetically:

- John Adams
- Samuel Adams
- Hannah Arendt
- Aristotle
- Hilaire Belloc
- Isaiah Berlin
- Edmund Burke
- Thomas Carlyle
- G. K. Chesterton
- Robert Dahl
- Charles Darwin
- Dorothy Day
- René Descartes
- Paul Feyerabend (later)
- Benjamin Franklin
- Sigmund Freud
- Mahatma Gandhi
- Edward Gibbon
- John N. Gray
- Alexander Hamilton
- Thomas Hobbes
- Victor Hugo
- David Hume
- William James
- Thomas Jefferson
- John Maynard Keynes
- C. S. Lewis
- Abraham Lincoln
- John Locke
- George MacDonald
- James Madison
- Joseph de Maistre
- William McKinley
- Thomas Merton
- John Stuart Mill
- John Milton
- Michel de Montaigne
- Montesquieu
- John Henry Newman
- Friedrich Nietzsche
- Flannery O'Connor
- Michael Oakeshott (later)
- Thomas Paine
- Charles Sanders Peirce
- Plato
- Karl Popper
- Joseph Raz
- Franklin D. Roosevelt
- Theodore Roosevelt
- Jean-Jacques Rousseau
- Adam Smith
- Socrates
- Baruch Spinoza
- Alexis de Tocqueville
- J. R. R. Tolkien
- Mark Twain
- Voltaire
- George Washington
- Walt Whitman
- Bernard Williams

== See also ==
- Anekantavada
- Liberal democracy
- Moderation
- Plurationalism
- Value pluralism
