= Dreams of the Raven =

1987 novel by Carmen Carter

- Author: Carmen Carter
- Language: English
- Series: Star Trek: The Original Series
- Genre: Science fiction novel
- Publisher: Pocket Books
- Publication date: May 1987
- Publication place: United States
- Media type: Print (paperback)
- Pages: 255
- ISBN: 0-671-74356-2 (first edition, paperback)
- Preceded by: Deep Domain
- Followed by: The Romulan Way

Dreams of the Raven is a science fiction novel by American writer Carmen Carter, part of the Star Trek: The Original Series saga.

== Plot ==
A mysterious distress call leads to the USS Enterprise being attacked by the same forces assaulting the other ship. Dozens of Enterprise crew members die in the attack and Chief Medical Officer Leonard McCoy is critically injured. Although the Doctor recovers from his injuries physically, mentally he has lost all sense of his former identity. Kirk discovers it is much more difficult tracking down their new enemies without McCoy's always valued advice.

== Reception ==
The book made the New York Times bestseller list in June 1987.

Author Steve Mollmann, who co-wrote 2014 novel "Star Trek: A Choice of Catastrophes" called it "both a gripping story and a smart look at McCoy" and said it was his favorite McCoy story.
