= The True Story of Lynn Stuart =

1958 film by Lewis Seiler

- Directed by: Lewis Seiler
- Written by: John H. Kneubuhl
- Produced by: Bryan Foy
- Starring: Betsy Palmer; Jack Lord; Barry Atwater
- Cinematography: Burnett Guffey
- Edited by: Saul A. Goodkind
- Distributed by: Columbia Pictures
- Release date: March 8, 1958
- Running time: 78 minutes
- Country: United States
- Language: English

The True Story of Lynn Stuart (originally titled The Other Life of Lynn Stuart) is a 1958 American biographical crime drama film starring Betsy Palmer, Jack Lord, Barry Atwater and released by Columbia Pictures.

Marking the final directorial effort of Lewis Seiler, it dramatizes the true story of a young Santa Ana, California, housewife who became a volunteer undercover narcotics agent in the 1950s. The woman, known publicly only by the pseudonym Lynn Stuart to protect her from possible reprisals, served in that capacity for six years and provided information which ultimately led to approximately 30 drug-related convictions.

== Plot ==
In a prologue, Edmund "Pat" Brown, who was the California Attorney General at the time of the film's production, makes a statement directly to the viewer, attesting to the veracity of the film's story and to the societal scourge presented by drug trafficking.

The film then opens with a police car chase through Orange County, California, which ends with the fleeing vehicle crashing, killing both of its occupants. It turns out that both were drug addicts and under the influence at the time of the chase. At a hearing, an aunt of one of the boys, an attractive young mother and housewife named Phyllis Carter (Betsy Palmer), angrily denounces police efforts to control the flow of illegal narcotics.

Phyllis comes to the police offering to volunteer her services as an undercover narcotics agent. The police originally reject her offer, but after discovering that their primary source of information on a particular gang of drug smugglers has been murdered, they reconsider. Ralph Carter (Kim Spalding), Phyllis' husband, initially laughs off the idea, but when he finds out that the police actually want make use of Phyllis, he becomes worried. He consents on the condition that should he ever ask her to quit, she and the police will comply.

Phyllis Carter is provided with a new identity: Lynn Stuart, an ex-convict from West Virginia who had served 18 months in prison for her part in a bank robbery. She is also given a job as a waitress in a local diner, where members of the targeted gang are known by police to congregate. The police direct her to Willie Down (Jack Lord), whom they suspect might be able to lead them to the head of the outfit. Eventually, Carter, acting the role of Lynn Stuart, indeed does catch Down's attention and she becomes his girlfriend.

As she becomes closer to Down, Carter learns many of the ins-and-outs of the drug smuggling operation in which Down is involved. She reports her information back to police and says that she believes she is getting closer to being able to identify the top men in the operation. However, her home life suffers and her husband insists that she quit, which she agrees to do after the next day. But during that next day, Down pulls her deeply into a plan to hijack a competing gang's drug shipment. In the meantime, Carter's son is hospitalized with pneumonia, and the authorities are unable to contact her to inform her.

After robbing the drug shipment from its drivers, Down murders them and the informant he had used from the competing gang. Carter is extremely unnerved by the killings, but can find no way to extricate herself from Down. When they stop at a gas station, she leaves a note in the restroom instructing whoever finds it to contact the police for her and direct them to the motel being used by the gang.

Back at the motel, Carter's nervous and frightened behavior continues, which concerns both Down and the gang's leader Doc (John Anderson). When she hears a radio report that authorities are searching for Phyllis Carter, whose son is very ill, she flies into near-hysterics. Although they still do not know the truth about her, Doc and Down decide that her behavior is too much of a risk to them and that Down will kill her. Before he can do so, though, police raid the motel, having been contacted by a gas station attendant who found Carter's note. They take all of the criminals into custody and inform Carter that her son is going to be alright.

After giving testimony to a grand jury, Carter is reunited with her husband and son. The family is relocated to Denver, with the Doc and his gang never knowing her true identity.

== Cast ==
- Betsy Palmer – Phyllis Carter, also known as Lynn Stuart
- Jack Lord – Willie Down
- Barry Atwater – Lt. Jim Hagan
- Edmund G. Brown – Himself
- Kim Spalding – Ralph Carter
- Karl Lukas – Hal Bruck
- Casey Walters – Eddie Dine
- Claudia Bryar – Nora Efron
- John Anderson – "Doc"
- Rita Duncan – Sue
- Lee Farr – Ben
- Louis Towers – Jimmie Carter
- James Maloney – Dr. Freeley
- Carlos Romero – Fred
- Artie Lewis – Gus
- Gavin MacLeod – Turk
- Linda Cherney – Car hop
- Don Devlin – The Kid
- Edward Le Veque – Father Albert

== Actual events ==
In the film, the exact amount of time that Lynn Stuart is involved with the drug gang is not specified, but it seems to be not more than a matter of weeks; the actual woman known as Lynn Stuart maintained her undercover identity for six years. In the film, she is supplied with an apartment separate from her actual home with her family, and the gang members know only the apartment as her residence; in reality, her actual family residence was known to gang members with whom she was involved.

In the film, the death of her nephew serves as the catalyst for her offer to go undercover; in reality, she cited only the fear that the drug trade might negatively affect her own sons when they became teenagers. The film depicts Stuart as merely an observer of the gang's illegal activities prior to her being pulled into the hijacking on her last day; in reality she was more actively involved in the activities, including making drug purchases.

== Production notes ==
The actual woman known as Lynn Stuart served as a technical adviser for the film, whose original title was The Other Life of Lynn Stuart. Stuart made a point to mask herself when visiting the set. Since Stuart had left her undercover identity without those she had helped convict knowing the truth about her, Columbia Pictures made the film with the stipulation that the company would not allow it to be screened in any California prisons, to help prevent inmates incarcerated because of Stuart's actions from deducing that she had betrayed them.

The True Story of Lynn Stuart marked the first feature film appearance by later television star Gavin MacLeod, who had a small, uncredited role as a member of the drug gang.

== See also ==
- List of American films of 1958
