= Deep Domain =

1987 novel by Howard Weinstein

- Author: Howard Weinstein
- Language: English
- Series: Star Trek: The Original Series
- Genre: Science fiction
- Publisher: Pocket Books
- Publication date: 1 March 1987
- Publication place: United States
- Media type: Print (paperback)
- Pages: 275
- ISBN: 0-671-70549-0 (first edition, paperback)
- OCLC: 123098505
- Preceded by: Battlestations!
- Followed by: Dreams of the Raven

Deep Domain is a science fiction novel by American writer Howard Weinstein, part of the Star Trek: The Original Series franchise.

== Plot ==
Admiral Kirk and the Enterprise visit the ocean-world of Akkalla for diplomatic reasons. Soon Spock and Chekov become lost. A civil war and secrets under the water threaten the entire planet and the Enterprise.

== Background ==
Howard Weinstein previously wrote an episode of Star Trek: The Animated Series called "The Pirates of Orion."

Weinstein had met with Leonard Nimoy, director of Star Trek IV: The Voyage Home, while Nimoy was developing the story for the film. The two discussed, among other things, the idea of using whales, or creatures similar to whales, something later seen in both that film as well as Deep Domain. Weinstein commented that, "To this day, I don't know if whales ended up in ST:IV partly as a result of my suggestion, or whether they'd already decided that. But they were nice enough to give me that “Thank you” credit". Weinstein drafted a story based on his ideas within a week but the filmmakers were already developing something and so he turned it into the story which became "Deep Domain" instead.
