= Kermit Murdock =

American actor

- Born: March 20, 1908; Pittsburgh, Pennsylvania, U.S.
- Died: February 11, 1981 (aged 72); Tenafly, New Jersey, U.S.
- Occupations: Radio, television actor
- Years active: 1956–1977

Kermit Murdock (20 March 1908 – 11 February 1981) was an American film, television and radio actor known for his avuncular and professorial character portrayals.

His more prominent character roles in major motion pictures included Dean Pollard in Splendor in the Grass (1961), Henderson, the banker in In the Heat of The Night (1967), and Dr. Robertson in The Andromeda Strain (1971).

He is also remembered for his voice acting in many episodes of the 1950s science fiction radio series X Minus One. He was in The Mysterious Traveler episode "Survival of the Fittest" with Everett Sloane, and was featured in an episode of the series Adventure Ahead.

He appeared in character roles in television programs of the 1960s and 1970s including episodes of The Mary Tyler Moore Show, Kung Fu, The Mod Squad, and The Defenders. He portrayed a prosecutor of witches in the penultimate Star Trek episode, "All Our Yesterdays" (1969).

Murdock died on 11 February 1981, aged 72.

== Filmography ==
| Year | Title | Role | Notes |
|---|---|---|---|
| 1961 | Splendor in the Grass | Dean Pollard | |
| 1967 | In the Heat of The Night | Henderson | |
| 1969 | Star Trek: The Original Series | The Prosecutor | S3:E23, "All Our Yesterdays" |
| 1970 | On a Clear Day You Can See Forever | Hoyt III | |
| 1971 | The Andromeda Strain | Dr. Robertson | |
| 1976 | Rich Man, Poor Man | The Minister | |
