= Barry Atwater (painter) =

American painter

Barry Atwater (1892, Minnesota — January 15, 1956, Santa Fe, New Mexico) was an American artist primarily known for painting landscapes of the southwestern United States. He was the father of actor Barry Atwater.

== Life ==
Atwater grew up in Denver, Colorado, and settled in Los Angeles where he worked as an interior decorator. As a hobby he began painting desert landscapes, eventually moving with his wife to a small cabin built for him by advertising executive Ray Morgan on a 2,000-acre (8.1 km^{2}) ranch in Dos Palmas, [California]. Morgan built the retreat for Atwater so he could live among the scenery he painted. In the 1940s Atwater relocated to Santa Fe, New Mexico.

Atwater's paintings are noted for their highly contrasted areas of flat color, suggesting the stark beauty of America's southwestern terrain.
