= Carmen Carter =

American novelist

- Born: October 21, 1954; San Antonio, Texas, United States
- Writing career
- Period: 1987–1994
- Genre: Science fiction

Carmen Cecilia Carter (born 1954) is an American science fiction writer, author of several bestselling novels that take place in the Star Trek universe.

== Biography ==
Born in San Antonio, Texas on October 21, 1954, Carter was the daughter of Will Cecil and Yolanda Carter (a small press publisher, née Calderon). After earning a BA from UT Austin and an MS from Indiana University, she wrote books in her spare time for many years, concurrently with a career as a freelance audio visual production manager living in New York City. In an interview with Contemporary Authors after the publication of The Children of Hamlin, she noted, "For the past twenty years, writing has been my hobby ... now that two books have made it into print, I am forced to reconsider my point of view." She published two further books. The Devil's Heart, from 1994, is presently her last.

== Themes and critical response ==
Carter's first book, Dreams of the Raven, was a New York Times paperback bestseller, as was her third, Doomsday World. Her first hardcover publication, The Devil's Heart, was a bestseller as well, and also as an audio book (read by Gates McFadden).

In his review of The Devil's Heart for School Library Journal, John Lawson wrote of the novel's themes of the temptation of power and greed, noting also, "Carter has woven several individual story lines into a complex, textured, well-written plot and peopled it with three-dimensional characters." In another positive review, for Booklist, John Mort notes that Carter devotes special attention to the Next Generation characters of Counselor Troi and Dr. Crusher.

== Bibliography ==
- Dreams of the Raven (1987) ISBN 0-671-64500-5
- The Children of Hamlin (1988) ISBN 978-0-7434-1215-5
- Doomsday World (with Michael Jan Friedman, Peter David, and Robert Greenberger) (1990) ISBN 0-671-74144-6
- The Devil's Heart (1994) ISBN 0-7434-2063-2
