= Steven W. Carabatsos =

American screenwriter (born 1938)

- Born: October 2, 1938; United States
- Died: October 24, 2025 (age 87); Mammoth Lakes, California
- Education: Cornell Law School
- Occupation: Screenwriter

Steven W. Carabatsos (October 2, 1938 - October 24, 2025) was an American screenwriter and story editor on Star Trek between the tenures of John D. F. Black and D. C. Fontana.

== Early life ==
Steven W. Carabatsos grew up in Manhattan, where he attended Hunter College on the Upper East Side. Following his graduation, he attended Cornell Law School.

== Screenwriting career ==
While at Cornell, he wrote a spec script for the medical drama Ben Casey. Producer Jack Laird purchased the script for use, and when he moved onto the college-based drama Channing, he hired Carabatsos to ensure that the scripts remained college oriented. Carabatsos described himself as "technical adviser in charge of rah-rah", and corresponded with his younger brother (then at college) as well as visiting colleges in the Los Angeles area in order to keep up with current trends.

Following the departure of John D. F. Black as story editor of Star Trek, Carabatsos was hired as his replacement in August 1966. To welcome him to the production team, the show's creator, Gene Roddenberry, decided to prank him. When Carabatsos arrived for his first day, Roddenberry had arranged for a weather balloon to be inflated inside his office, preventing him from opening the door and getting inside. The joke was only revealed after Carabatsos struggled with the door for a while.

While his contract stipulated that he would be allowed to write one episode in addition to his re-writing duties as story editor, Carabatsos found it difficult to fit his own writing around his main duties. His first job on the show was to re-write Harlan Ellison's script for "The City on the Edge of Forever" in order to bring it within budget. Ellison later accused Carabatsos of "taking a chainsaw" to the script, with multiple changes made including the addition of the Guardian of Forever and the change to initial setup wherein Doctor Leonard McCoy is overdosed with cordrazine. Roddenberry did not like Carabatsos' version, and asked Ellison to conduct a further re-write.

During the production of "Court Martial", Carabatsos was told by producer Gene L. Coon to write an entirely new script, using the same ideas and the same sets. The alternative script was later merged with the original, earning Carabatsos a co-writer credit alongside Don Mankiewicz. Carabatsos' tenure as story editor on Star Trek did not last long, and he was replaced by D. C. Fontana, but his departure left him able to write his own script as previously contracted. Carabatsos credited Roddenberry for the idea for "Operation: Destroy!", and he turned in the first version of the outline on December 15, 1966. A second draft was dated January 19, 1967, but after it was sent to the executives at NBC, they responded that they wanted to see faster pacing. The script was subsequently re-written, first by Fontana, and later by Roddenberry, becoming "Operation -- Annihilate!" in the process.

Following his departure, Carabatsos worked on several different television series as a writer and wrote the screenplays for films such as The Last Flight of Noah's Ark, a Walt Disney live-action film released in 1980, and Hot Pursuit, a 1987 film starring John Cusack.

== Filmography ==
=== Films ===
Year	Film	Credit	Notes
1970	El Condor	Screenplay by, Story By	Co-Wrote screenplay with Larry Cohen
1972	The Revengers	Story By	
1977	Tentacles	Screenplay by	Co-Wrote screenplay with "Tito Carpi" and "Jerome Max"
1980	The Last Flight of Noah's Ark	Screenplay By	Co-Wrote screenplay with "Sandy Glass" and "George Arthur Bloom"
1987	Hot Pursuit	Screenplay By	Co-Wrote screenplay with "Steven Lisberger"

=== Television ===
Year	TV Series	Credit	Notes
1963	Channing	Writer	1 Episode
1963-66	Ben Casey	Writer	3 Episodes
1964-65	Peyton Place	Writer, Script Consultant	28 Episodes
1966	The Fugitive	Writer	1 Episode
1966-67	The Big Valley	Writer	3 Episodes
1967	Star Trek	Writer, Script Consultant	12 Episodes
1976	Kojak	Writer	1 Episode
1981	The Magical World of Disney	Writer	2 Episodes
