= Operation – Annihilate! =

- Star Trek: The Original Series episode
- Spock, Kirk, and Scotty attack the parasites
- Episode no.: Season 1 Episode 29
- Directed by: Herschel Daugherty
- Written by: Steven W. Carabatsos
- Cinematography by: Jerry Finnerman
- Production code: 029
- Original air date: April 13, 1967

Guest appearances
- Joan Swift – Aurelan Kirk; Craig Hundley – Peter Kirk; Dave Armstrong – Kartan; Maurishka – Yeoman Zahra; Fred Carson – First Denevan; Jerry Catron – Second Denevan; Eddie Paskey – Lt. Leslie

Episode chronology
← Previous "The City on the Edge of Forever"	Next → "Amok Time"
- Star Trek: The Original Series season 1

"Operation – Annihilate!" is the twenty-ninth and final episode of the first season of the American science fiction television series Star Trek. Written by Steven W. Carabatsos and directed by Herschel Daugherty, it was first broadcast April 13, 1967.

In the episode, the crew of the Enterprise must find a way to exterminate behavior-altering parasites that have taken over the bodies of residents of a Federation colony, including Captain Kirk's brother, Sam, and family. The episode is popular for revealing new facts about Vulcan physiology.

== Plot ==
The USS Enterprise is tracking a path of mass insanity that has affected several planets, causing the collapse of their civilizations. They approach Deneva, a Federation colony where Captain Kirk's brother, Sam, has been stationed along with Sam's wife Aurelan and son, Peter. After entering the system, they try to stop a ship as it flies into the local sun, its pilot raving about being "free" before the ship is destroyed.

Transporting to Deneva's main city, Kirk, First Officer Spock, Chief Medical Officer Dr. McCoy and a security detail find the town quiet. A group of men armed with clubs try to warn the landing party away, and then attack. Kirk has the men stunned with phasers, but McCoy finds that their brains are still being violently stimulated despite being unconscious. The party locates the Kirk family home; Sam (played by William Shatner) is dead, while Aurelan (Joan Swift) acts irrationally before passing out and Peter (Craig Hundley) is comatose. Kirk and McCoy return with the survivors to Enterprise, where McCoy finds they are suffering from a condition similar to that of their attackers. McCoy gives both painkillers, and Aurelan wakes briefly to tell Kirk of horrible "things" spreading from planet to planet, using others' bodies to build ships, before she dies.

Kirk returns to the planet and joins Spock in search for these entities. They find a number of single-celled creatures attached to the walls and ceiling of one building. The creatures fly, and attempt to attack the humans; the landing party finds they are nearly immune to phaser fire. One creature attaches itself to Spock's back before Kirk can pry it off, and Spock falls in pain. They transport back to the Enterprise, and McCoy determines that the creature has injected some of its tissue into Spock's spinal column; it has intertwined itself into his nervous system and will be impossible to remove surgically. When Spock regains consciousness, he escapes sickbay and deliriously attempts to take control of the ship, but McCoy sedates him in time. Later, back in sickbay, Spock apologizes to Kirk and asserts that his mental discipline can control the pain, but that he must return to the surface to acquire a specimen to study. Kirk and McCoy agree, and Spock, on return to the colony, is able to stun and retrieve a creature. Returning to the Enterprise, Spock and Kirk determine that the creatures are part of a hive mind. Spock and McCoy run numerous tests, but fail to find a way to destroy the creature.

Kirk holds a senior staff meeting, asserting they must find a solution before the creatures reach the next inhabited planet, holding over a million people; a solution that does not kill the hosts. Kirk recalls the ship's pilot stating that he was "free" before burning up in the sun, and suspects the sun's properties may harm the creatures. He realizes that they have not tried using visible light as a means to defeat the creatures. An initial test of blinding light results in the death of the specimen in sick bay. Spock then volunteers to be exposed to intense light, without eye protection, to prove that a creature infecting a host can be killed without killing the host. Though the test is successful and Spock is freed from the parasite's control, he is rendered blind as a result. Later analysis of the initial test shows that only ultraviolet light was necessary to kill the creature, meaning that Spock need not have been blinded.

The Enterprise floods the colony with ultraviolet light from an array of satellites, killing the creatures on the planet and purging the parasites from the survivors. As the Enterprise prepares to leave orbit, Spock reveals that his Vulcan inner eyelids had prevented permanent blindness and that he can see again.

== Production ==
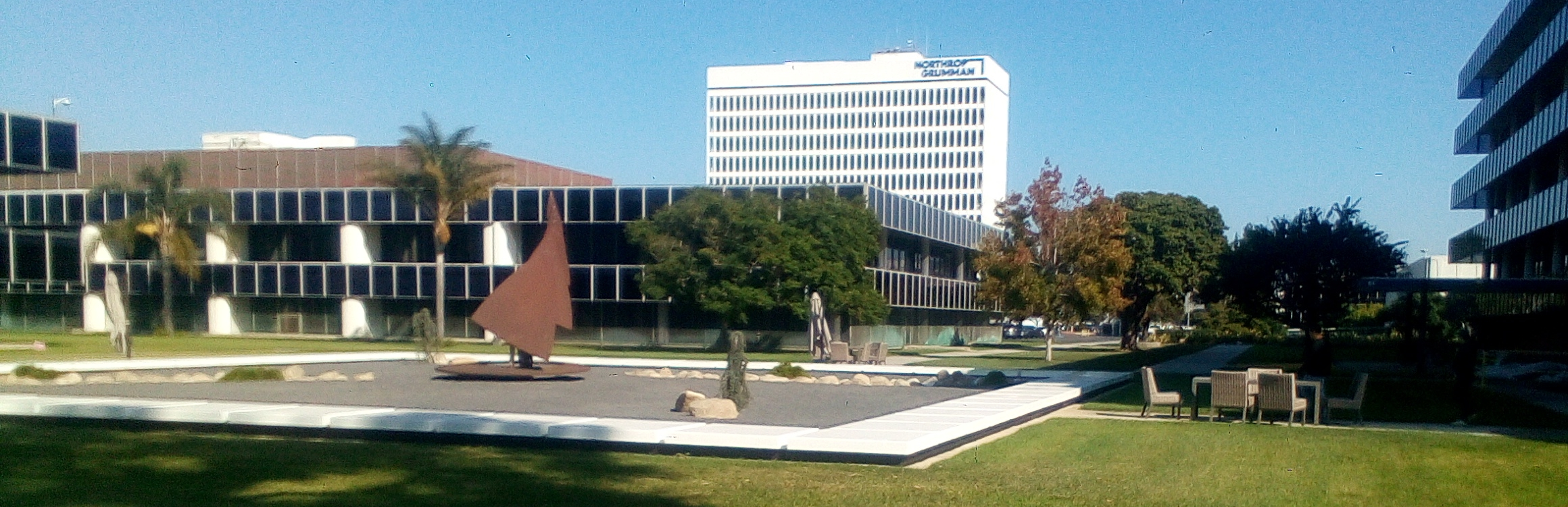
Historic quad courtyard plaza at Space Park with 75'×75' (23×23 m) reflecting pool (now filled with dry gravel for water conservation) where the crew beamed down from the starship Enterprise.

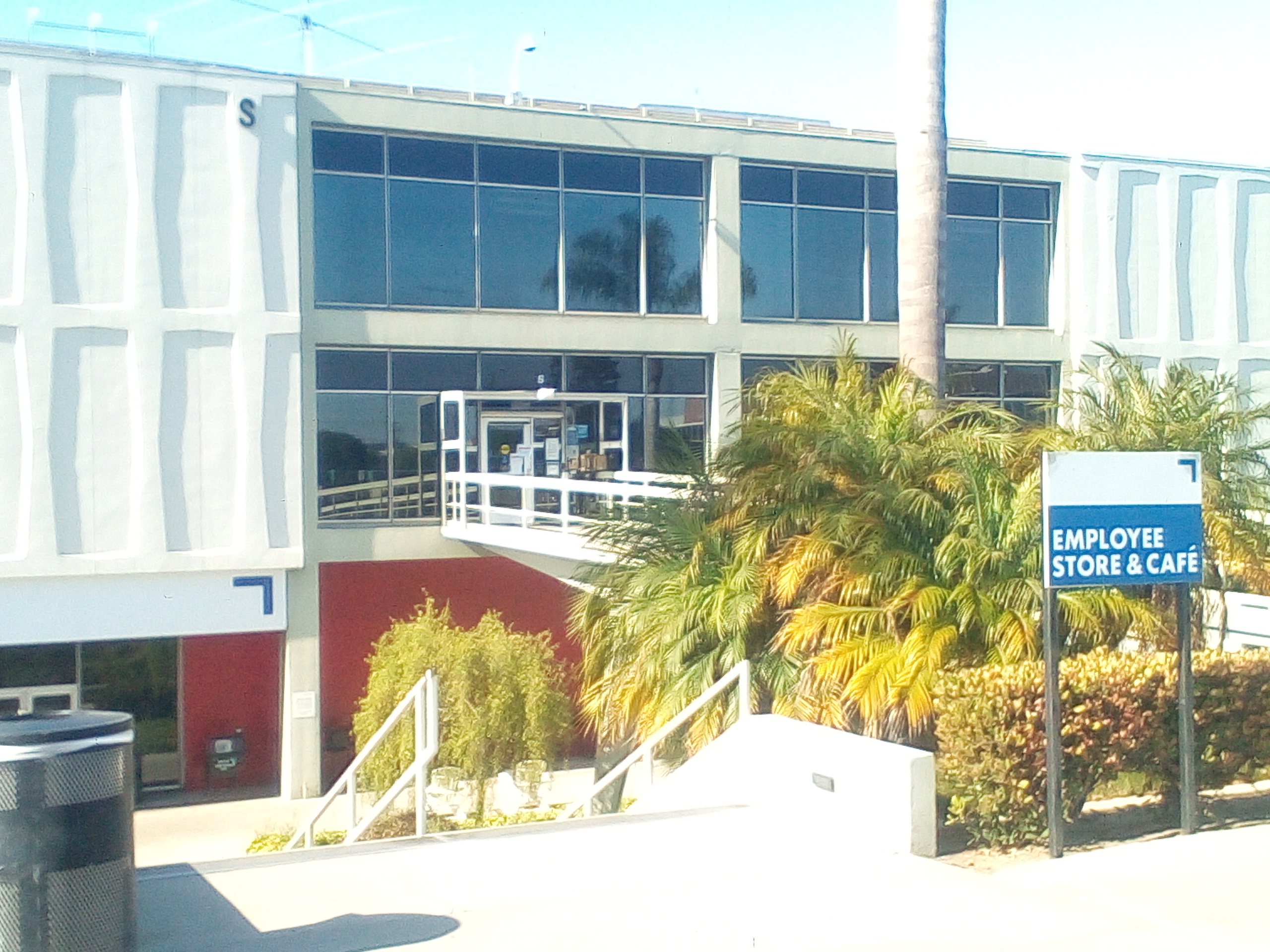
Bldg. S ("service") at Space Park showing staircase leading down to S-Cafe cafeteria. Denevans descended this to attack the Enterprise crew under the walkway seen in the center leading to the 1st-floor entrance. Also visible is the red-tiled wall near the lower-level entrance where Mr. Spock engaged in hand-to-hand combat with a Denevan.

The script, which was written by Steven W. Carabatsos, was originally titled "Operation: Destroy". Aurelan was a Denevan woman in love with a man named Kartan, and it was Kartan who flew the ship into the Denevan sun in the cold open sequence. Aurelan's father was also a major character in the teleplay, and the two colonists were not infected by the "Denevan neural parasites". Instead, they helped Dr. McCoy and Mr. Spock with the research into how light could destroy the parasites. The script did not originally end with the Enterprise crew using light to destroy the parasites. Instead, the ship learns the location of the aliens' home world, and destroys the central controlling "brain" located there. Author James Blish used this draft of the script when adapting the episode for print, and this ending appears in the chapter "Operation -- Annihilate!" in the anthology Star Trek 2.

This was the first episode of the series to be directed by Herschel Daugherty. Daugherty would later direct season three's "The Savage Curtain" as well. It was also the first appearance in Star Trek for child actor Craig Hundley, who played Peter Kirk. He would also portray Tommy Starnes in the third-season episode "And the Children Shall Lead".

Location shooting occurred in two places. The scene where the Enterprise landing party beams down to the surface was filmed at the TRW campus, Space Park (now Northrop Grumman Aerospace Systems) in Redondo Beach, California. The entrance of Sam Kirk's laboratory is the cafeteria in bldg. S at Space Park. The exterior of Sam Kirk's laboratory, which features white pylons, is Schoenberg Hall at the University of California, Los Angeles. Filming at TRW occurred on February 15, 1967.

The neural parasites were created by prop designer Wah Chang from bags of fake vomit.

The episode aired on April 13, 1967, and was the final episode to air in the series' first season. One scene did not make it into the episode. This scene came at the end of the story, and featured Peter Kirk (dressed in a command division tunic) sitting in the captain's chair on the bridge while his uncle, James T. Kirk, agrees to let him return to Deneva to live with Sam Kirk's research partner and friend. Although filmed, it was edited out due to time constraints. This left actor Hundley with no lines in the finished episode; the character of Peter Kirk spends the entire show unconscious. It also left the episode with no explanation of what becomes of Peter.

== Reception ==
Zack Handlen of The A.V. Club gave the episode a 'B+' rating, describing it as "a little rocky in places" but otherwise praising the alien menace and Nimoy's acting.

In 2016, TVLine ranked this as having one of the top twenty moments of Star Trek, noting the terrifying moment when the alien attacks Spock.

Hollywood.com ranked Operation—Annihilate! at 36 out of the 79 original series episodes.

== In popular culture ==
Galaxie 500, an American alternative rock band, wrote a song about the episode for their 1990 album This Is Our Music. The song was titled "Spook," but the band secretly used the title "Spock" since the lyrics referred to Spock's blindness in this episode:

When you went blind
Then I nearly lost my mind
It didn't last
'Cause you have another eyelid

Rock band Powerman 5000 sampled Aurelan's line, "They came... Things...! HORRIBLE things!" from this episode for the beginning of their song, "Public Menace, Freak, Human Fly," the first track on their Mega!! Kung Fu Radio album.

== Bibliography ==
- Asherman, Alan. The Star Trek Compendium. New York: Pocket Books, 1981.
- Blish, James. Star Trek 2. New York: Bantam Books, 1968.
- Clark, Mark. Star Trek FAQ: Everything Left to Know about the First Voyages of the Starship Enterprise. Milwaukee, Wisc.: Applause Theatre & Cinema, 2012.
- Okuda, Denise; Mirek, Debbie; and Okuda, Michael. The Star Trek Encyclopedia. New York: Pocket Books, 2011.
- Schuster, Hal and Rathbone, Wendy. Trek: The Unauthorized A-Z. New York: HarperPrism, 1994.
- Wareham, Dean. Black Postcards: A Memoir. New York: Penguin Books, 2009.
