= Barry Atwater =

American actor (1918–1978)

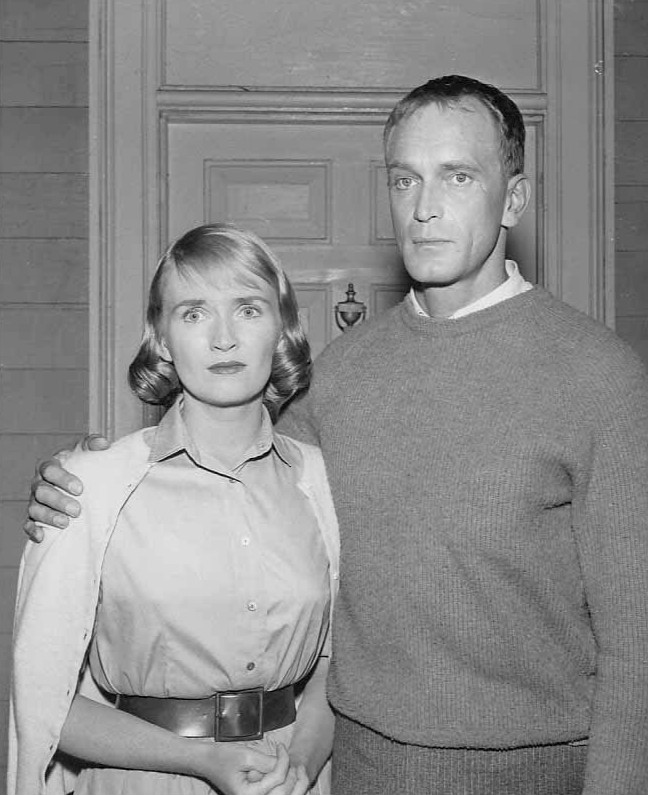
- Atwater (right) in The Twilight Zone The Monsters Are Due on Maple Street
- Born: Garrett Atwater; May 16, 1918; Denver, Colorado, U.S.
- Died: May 24, 1978 (aged 60); Los Angeles, California, U.S.
- Other name: G.B. Atwater
- Occupation: Actor
- Years active: 1954–1978
- Father: Barry Atwater

Garrett "Barry" Atwater (May 16, 1918 – May 24, 1978) was an American character actor who appeared frequently on television from the 1950s into the 1970s. He was sometimes credited as G.B. Atwater.

== Life and career ==
The son of the landscape painter of the same name, Garrett Atwater was born in Denver, Colorado. He served as head of the UCLA Sound Department before he began his acting career.

He appeared in the student film A Time Out of War, a Civil War allegory that won the Oscar as best short film of 1954.

He was awarded a Special Cinema Award for television work in 1958.

Atwater, a character actor, received positive notice in Variety for his role in The Hard Man (1957), The True Story of Jesse James (1957), The True Story of Lynn Stuart (1958), Vice Raid (1959), and As Young As We Are (1958). About his work in the television show Judd, for the Defense, Variety wrote, "Barry Atwater succeeded in bringing some life and a peculiar believability to an impossible role."

By 1960, he had achieved enough stature to be named by host Rod Serling in the on-screen promo as one of the stars of the well-known CBS The Twilight Zone episode "The Monsters Are Due on Maple Street". Atwater made six guest appearances on Perry Mason including as Robert Benson in the 1959 episode "The Case of the Dangerous Dowager" and as murder victim Dr. Stuart Logan in the 1965 episode "The Case of the Cheating Chancellor". A Variety review of the latter stated that Atwater played the part with "correct nastiness".

Those Perry Mason episodes were preceded by a 1956 appearance on Gunsmoke, in the episode "Robin Hood", where he shared the screen with future Mason regular William Hopper.

He appeared in the One Step Beyond episode "The Riddle" in 1959, playing an Indian on a train who attracts the mysterious enmity of an American tourist. He played Benedict Arnold in an episode of Voyage to the Bottom of the Sea and received positive notice for an appearance on Playhouse 90.

Atwater in the mid-1960s spent three years on the ABC soap opera General Hospital while he also made prime-time appearances, billing himself as G.B. Atwater from 1963 to 1965, a period in which he was cast in supporting parts. About his nine-month stint on General Hospital, Atwater said, "It was a good experience and good income, but it got tiresome. Shows like that are written for women, and the men are all emasculated." In 1971 he guest-starred in a 2-part episode of Hawaii Five-0, "The Grandstand Play". By the late 1960s and early 1970s, Atwater was again scoring primary guest-star roles, particularly on fantasy and science fiction series, including The Man From U.N.C.L.E., The Invaders,The Wild Wild West, The Outer Limits ("Corpus Earthling"), Night Gallery and Kung Fu, where his altered facial appearance suited his grim and sinister countenance due to its menacing intensity.

=== On the stage ===
Atwater performed regularly on stage throughout his career. In January 1958, it was announced that Atwater would be in a benefit performance in Passing of the Third Floor Back with the Episcopal Theatre Guild. He received positive notice in the Los Angeles Times for his appearance in Volpone. Atwater also appeared on stage in 1965 in The Disenchanted at the Actors Theatre. In 1966, he was in the Edward Albee play Tiny Alice at the Ivar Theatre. In 1968, he directed and performed in the play A Slight Ache at the Hollywood-Vine Methodist Center.

=== Sci-fi legacy ===

Atwater was one of the few actors to play a character from Spock's planet on Star Trek: The Original Series, portraying Surak, father of Vulcan philosophy, in the episode "The Savage Curtain". Atwater could not achieve the Vulcan salute naturally, so when he bids farewell in a medium shot, he has to first lower his arm so his hand is out of camera view as he pushes his fingers against his body to configure them properly.

Kevin Thomas of the Los Angeles Times praised Atwater's performance in The Night Stalker, writing, "that gifted character actor Barry Atwater is terrific as the vampire". Keith Ashwell of the Edmonton Journal wrote that Atwater was "a prince among vampires".

He also guest starred in a 1963 episode of The Outer Limits, "Corpus Earthling", with Robert Culp as scientist Dr. Temple in 1963.

== Personal life and death ==
Atwater embraced and attributed his career success to the practice of Zen.

Atwater died on May 24, 1978, aged 60 after suffering a stroke.

== Selected filmography ==
Year	Title	Role	Comments
1956-1959	Gunsmoke	Harry Bowen & Ed Eby	Episodes: "Robin Hood" And "The Coward"
1956	The Scarlet Hour	Crime Lab Technician	Uncredited
1956	Nightmare	Captain Warner	
1956	Man from Del Rio	Dan Ritchy	Uncredited
1956	The Rack	Major Byron Phillips	
1956	Everything but the Truth	Arthur Taylor	
1957	The True Story of Jesse James	Attorney Walker	
1957	The Hard Man	George Dennison	
1958	The True Story of Lynn Stuart	Police Lieutenant Jim Hagan	
1958	As Young as We Are	Mr. Peterson	
1958	Bat Masterson	Murdering Outlaw Egan	"Trail Pirate" (S1E12)
1959	Crime and Punishment U.S.A.		
1959	Pork Chop Hill	Lieutenant Colonel Davis (Battalion Commander)	
1959	Vice Raid	Phil Evans	
1960	The Twilight Zone	Les Goodman	Episode: “The Monsters Are Due on Maple Street”
1960	Cheyenne	Colonel Custer	Back-to-Back Episodes: "Gold, Glory and Custer - Prelude"; And "Gold, Glory and Custer – Requiem"
1961	Battle at Bloody Beach	Pelham	
1962	Sweet Bird of Youth	Ben Jackson	
1963	Perry Mason	Professor Ronald Hewes	Season 6 Episode 15: "The Case of the Prankish Professor"
1963	Captain Newman, M.D.	Major Dawes	Uncredited
1963	The Alfred Hitchcock Hour	Policeman Garfield 'Gar' Newton	Season 2 Episode 4: "You'll Be the Death of Me"
1965	The Alfred Hitchcock Hour	Borchter	Season 3 Episode 15: "Thanatos Palace Hotel"
1966	Alvarez Kelly	General Kautz	
1966	Bewitched	Boris	Episode: "Twitch or Treat"
1966	Mission: Impossible	Dr. Carlos Enero	"Elena" (S01E13)
1967	Return of the Gunfighter	Lomax	
1967	Mannix	"David Blair Phillips"	"Who will dig the graves?" (S02E08)
1968	The Invaders	Dorcas	Episode: "The Organization"
1969	The Thousand Plane Raid	General Conway	
1969	Star Trek	Surak (Excalbian recreation)	S3:E22, "The Savage Curtain"
1972	The Night Stalker	Janos Skorzeny	TV Movie
1973	Night Gallery	Brandon	Episode: "The Doll of Death"
1974	The Teacher	Sheriff Murphy	
1974	Win, Place or Steal	Teller #2	
1977	The Rockford Files	Roach	Episode: "Hotel of Fear"
1978	F.I.S.T.	Milano's Attorney	
1978	The Kid from Not-So-Big	Nickerson	(final film role)
