= The Circle of Reason (society) =

International society which espouses pluralistic rationalism

- Abbreviation: TCOR
- Formation: 2000
- Founded at: Minneapolis, Minnesota, U.S.
- Type: Nonprofit organization
- Purpose: Promote pluralistic rationalism; discourage ad hominem invective
- Region served: International
- Exec. Director: Frank Burton
- Website: circleofreason.org

The Circle of Reason (TCOR) is a Twin Cities, Minnesota-based international society of theists, atheists, conservatives, and liberals who espouse the social philosophy of pluralistic rationalism (also plurationalism or methodological rationalism).

== Overview ==
Pluralistic rationalism is described in cultural media as "commitment to reason[ing], regardless of one's worldview," and by the society itself as "communal commitment to more consistently practice the basic methodological tenets of a reasoning lifestyle (reality's acceptance, assumption's denial, and emotion's mastery) irrespective of our theological, ethical, cultural or political worldviews." According to The Circle of Reason, pluralistic rationalism is practiced through encouraging not a particular worldview, but rather factualism, skepticism, and moderationism; and furthermore through discouraging their opposing practices of denialism, dogmatism, and emotionalism – or "denials of reality, unquestioned assumptions (potentially false realities), and emotive arguments or actions (dissociation from reality)." Plurationalist practices include discouraging the verbal, printed or televised use of insults (which the group asserts is immoral because, as ad hominem argumentation, it seeks to "irrationally persuade by evoking emotionality.") Because plurationalists hold that "as a sapient being one's best tool to survive is one's ability to reason," they also claim people's basic universalized moral imperative must then be to likewise "consistently allow, and encourage, others to reason" as well – which, by rationally underpinning social behaviors otherwise considered subjectively emotional (such as compassion, kindness, and nonaggression), they claim represents "the world's first objective moral code."

Reflecting the plurationalist society's call to "more consistently use everyday reasoning regardless of our worldviews," its institutional practices have included organizing the United States' first reported "theist + atheist" dialogue group, "Secular Bible Study," for reasoning discussion on the historical context, societal impact and cultural relevance of the Bible and religion, and "Ancient Greek Peripatetic"-style nature walks combined with "transcultural, transbelief reasoning dialogue" on current social issues; organizing and moderating "Assumptions on the [Minnesota Same-Sex] Marriage Amendment: A Reasoning Forum" for theists, atheists, conservatives & liberals; defending a Catholic legislator shunned by his archdiocese for refusing to defund reproductive health clinics; presenting an address on plurationalism, "Be Sane — Be VERY Sane!" to the "Rally to Restore Sanity Minnesota" at the State Capitol; and successfully lobbying the state capital city's Council of Churches to become the first local council of religions in the United States to change the name of its religious "interfaith" dialogue group to "interbelief," to better welcome atheists and secular humanists with no religious faith but with philosophical or ethical beliefs.

The Pluralism Project at Harvard University has described The Circle of Reason as a "promising practice."

== See also ==
- Social philosophy
- National Endowment for the Humanities' Civility Tour
- Rally to Restore Sanity
- Rationalism
- Sophism
- Surak
