= Ann C. Crispin =

American science fiction writer

- Born: Ann Carol Tickell; April 5, 1950; Stamford, Connecticut, U.S.
- Died: September 6, 2013 (aged 63); Waldorf, Maryland, U.S.
- Education: University of Maryland
- Occupations: Writer, Computer Programmer
- Spouse(s): Randy Crispin (divorced); Michael Capobianco (m. 2001)
- Writing career
- Pen name: A. C. Crispin
- Period: 1983–2013
- Genres: Science fiction, screen novelization
- Notable works: Yesterday's Son, Sarek, The Han Solo Trilogy
- Notable awards: Tie-in Writers Grandmaster
- Website: accrispin.com

Ann Carol Crispin (April 5, 1950 – September 6, 2013) was an American science fiction writer and the author of 23 published novels. She wrote several Star Trek and Star Wars novelizations; she also created an original science fiction series called StarBridge.

== Career ==
Crispin started writing in 1978, and her career began in 1983. As a writer of "tie-in" novels she was known for developing the backgrounds and emotional lives of on-screen characters.

Two of her Star Trek novels—Yesterday's Son and Time for Yesterday—were direct sequels to the third-season episode "All Our Yesterdays", and detail Spock and Zarabeth's son. Yesterday's Son was the first non-novelization Star Trek novel to appear on the New York Times Best Seller list. Her later Star Trek works included the novel Sarek, which takes place after Star Trek VI: The Undiscovered Country. Her best-known Star Wars work, The Han Solo Trilogy, chronicles the life of Han Solo prior to Star Wars Episode IV: A New Hope. Crispin also wrote the novelizations for The V miniseries and the film Alien Resurrection, as well as Sylvester, a girl and horse film starring Melissa Gilbert.

When an editor working for Disney was seeking an author to write a novel dealing with the backstory of Captain Jack Sparrow, a major character from the Pirates of the Caribbean franchise, they contacted Crispin's agent and contracted her to write the book after reading The Han Solo Trilogy, which focused on Han Solo's backstory. According to Crispin herself, it took her three years to write and she did a lot of research on the historical period and the nautical stuff. She was also given the script for At World's End before the film released, but her book was finished before the script for On Stranger Tides was written. The instructions for A. C. Crispin in writing Pirates of the Caribbean: The Price of Freedom were to "stick to historical fact, unless it conflicts with established Pirates of the Caribbean continuity." Crispin made a faithful effort to do this, having done plenty of research, with Under the Black Flag by David Cordingly being one of the four pirate-related books she found herself using the most consistently. When releasing the fifth excerpt of her book, Crispin spoke of how she was privileged to write the scene where Han first beheld—and fell for—the Millennium Falcon in The Han Solo Trilogy. She assured fans it was every bit as thrilling to write the scene with Jack Sparrow and the merchant ship Wicked Wench. The Price of Freedom was published on May 17, 2011.

She also created her own StarBridge series of novels, aimed primarily at young readers.

Crispin was Eastern Regional Director, and then Vice President, of the Science Fiction and Fantasy Writers of America. With Victoria Strauss, she founded Writer Beware, a "watchdog" group that is part of SFWA that warns aspiring writers about the dangers of scam agents, editors, and publishers. Writer Beware was founded in 1998, and has assisted law enforcement and civil authorities in tracking and shutting down writing scams.

On April 19, 2013, Crispin was named the 2013 Grandmaster by the International Association of Media Tie-In Writers (IAMTW).

Her final completed work was Time Horse.

== Personal life ==
On September 3, 2013, StarTrek.com posted Crispin's farewell message after her prolonged illness bladder cancer deteriorated and became terminal. In the message Crispin said, "I want to thank you all for your good wishes and prayers. I fear my condition is deteriorating. I am doing the best I can to be positive but I probably don't have an awful lot of time left. I want you all to know that I am receiving excellent care and am surrounded by family and friends."

She died only three days later, at 63.

== Works ==
- The Han Solo Trilogy
  1. The Paradise Snare (1997), ISBN 0-553-57415-9
  2. The Hutt Gambit (1997), ISBN 0-553-57416-7
  3. Rebel Dawn (1997), ISBN 0-553-57417-5
  - Also available as Star Wars: The Han Solo Omnibus (2000)
- Star Wars short stories
  - "Play It Again, Figrin D'an" (in Tales from the Mos Eisley Cantina, 1995)
  - "Skin Deep" (in Tales from Jabba's Palace, 1996)
- StarBridge novel series
  1. StarBridge (1989)
  2. Silent Dances (1990) (with Kathleen O'Malley)
  3. Shadow World (1991) (with Jannean Elliott)
  4. Serpent's Gift (1992) (with Deborah A. Marshall)
  5. Silent Songs (1994) (with Kathleen O'Malley)
  6. Ancestor's World (1996) (with T. Jackson King)
  7. Voices of Chaos (1998) (with Ru Emerson)
- Star Trek
  - Yesterday's Son (1983)
  - Time for Yesterday (1988)
  - The Eyes of the Beholders (1990)
  - Sarek (1994)
  - Star Trek: Enter the Wolves (2001) (with Howard Weinstein) WildStorm Comics
  - Sand and Stars: Signature Edition (2004)
- Witch World
  - Gryphon's Eyrie (1984) (with Andre Norton)
  - Songsmith (1992) (with Andre Norton)
- V
  - V (1984)
  - V: East Coast Crisis (1984) (with Howard Weinstein)
  - V: Death Tide (1984) (with Deborah A. Marshall)
- The Exiles of Boq’urain
  - Storms Of Destiny (2005)
  - Future projects: Exiles of Boq'urain Trilogy · Book 2 & 3
- Miscellaneous
  - Sylvester (1985)
  - Alien Resurrection (1997) (with Kathleen O'Malley)
  - Pirates of the Caribbean: The Price of Freedom (2011)
