= All Our Yesterdays (Star Trek: The Original Series) =

- Star Trek: The Original Series episode
- Episode no.: Season 3 Episode 23
- Directed by: Marvin J. Chomsky
- Written by: Jean Lisette Aroeste
- Cinematography by: Al Francis
- Production code: 078
- Original air date: March 14, 1969

Guest appearances
- Ian Wolfe – Mr. Atoz; Mariette Hartley – Zarabeth; Kermit Murdock – The Prosecutor; Johnny Haymer – The Constable; Ed Bakey – The First Fop; Al Cavens – Second Fop; Anna Karen Morrow – Woman; Stan Barrett – Jailer

Episode chronology
← Previous "The Savage Curtain"	Next → "Turnabout Intruder"
- Star Trek: The Original Series season 3

"All Our Yesterdays" is the twenty-third and penultimate episode of the third season of the American science fiction television series Star Trek. Written by Jean Lisette Aroeste and directed by Marvin J. Chomsky, it was first broadcast March 14, 1969.

In the episode, Captain Kirk, Spock and Dr. McCoy are trapped in two timeframes of another planet's past.

It guest-stars Mariette Hartley as Zarabeth and Ian Wolfe as Mr. Atoz.

== Plot ==
The Federation starship Enterprise arrives at Sarpeidon, whose star will soon go nova. Kirk, Dr. McCoy and Spock beam down, encountering one resident, a librarian named Mr. Atoz. Aware of the imminent destruction, Atoz tells the landing party that he will soon rejoin his family. Atoz shows them the Atavachron, a time portal. Hearing a woman scream, Kirk runs through the portal, followed by McCoy and Spock.

Kirk finds himself in a period similar to 17th century England while McCoy and Spock travel back 5,000 years to Sarpeidon's ice age. They cannot locate the portal, but can speak to each other. Spock surmises that the Sarpeidons escaped to their past.

The woman who screamed is a thief. The policemen who arrest her hear Kirk speaking to his friends and suspect he is a witch. In jail, Kirk mentions the Atavachron to the prosecutor. The prosecutor is also from the future, but explains that returning would be fatal; the time travel preparation changes the traveler's biology. Because Kirk was not prepared, he cannot survive for more than a few hours. The prosecutor brings Kirk to the portal.

McCoy and Spock are saved by Zarabeth, a woman who takes them to a cave. Spock displays uncharacteristic emotionalism, falling in love with Zarabeth and growing angered by McCoy's slurs. Zarabeth is also from Sarpeidon's future, but was banished to this era, in which she is the only humanoid. She claims the Atavachron is a one-way trip. Spock accepts this, but McCoy accuses Zarabeth of lying, because she is desperate not to be abandoned. McCoy realizes that being brought into the past is causing Spock to revert to the barbarism of the ancient Vulcans. Realizing the emotionalism of his behavior, Spock asks Zarabeth again about the portal. She admits she does not know how a return trip will affect them.

Despite Kirk's explaining they are not from Sarpeidon, Atoz tries forcing him back into the portal. Kirk overpowers Atoz and forces him to find McCoy and Spock. Kirk is eventually able to talk with them. Unwilling to leave Zarabeth, and unaware he will die if he remains in the past, Spock tries sending McCoy through the portal alone. However, because McCoy and Spock went through the portal together, neither one can return without the other. Upon their return, Atoz hurries through the portal. Spock reverts to his normal self, and they are beamed back to the Enterprise. As the ship leaves the system, the star goes nova and Sarpeidon is destroyed.

== Production ==
The episode had its origins in Jean Lisette Aroeste's story outline "A Handful of Dust". Aroeste was a Star Trek fan without previous writing credits.

Its title is taken from the "Tomorrow and tomorrow and tomorrow" soliloquy by the title character in Macbeth.

== Reception ==
In 2015, SyFy ranked this episode as one of the top ten essential Star Trek original series Spock episodes.

In 2016, The Hollywood Reporter rated "All Our Yesterdays" the 39th best episode of all Star Trek episodes.

In 2016, SyFy ranked "All Our Yesterdays" as the 12th-best time travel plot of all episodes of the Star Trek franchise. They point out the episode offered fresh perspective on time travel by exploring the past of an alien world, as well as an interesting exploration of the characters Kirk, Spock, and McCoy.

A 2018 Star Trek binge-watching guide by Den of Geek, recommended this episode for featuring the trio of characters Kirk, Spock, and Bones of the original series.

In 2019, Nerdist News included this episode on their "Best of Spock" binge-watching guide. They also ranked it the tenth best time travel episode from the franchise’s 53-year run. They note this episode for featuring Spock's travels to an ancient ice age of an alien world, and at that time his emotions are triggered by a woman and the effects of time travel. In the series, they remarked that normally the character does not have much emotion, so seeing the character deal with emotions provides a change of pace for the character's presentation.

In 2024 Hollywood.com ranked All Our Yesterdays at number 15 out of the 79 original series episodes

== Sequels ==
Author Ann C. Crispin wrote two non-canonical novel sequels to this episode, titled Yesterday's Son, and Time for Yesterday.

== Releases ==
"All Our Yesterdays" and "The Savage Curtain" were released on LaserDisc in the United States in 1985.

This episode was released in Japan on December 21, 1993 as part of the complete season 3 LaserDisc set, Star Trek: Original Series log.3. A trailer for this and the other episodes was also included, and the episode had English and Japanese audio tracks. The cover script was スター・トレック TVサードシーズン [Star Trek TV Third Season].

This episode was included in TOS Season 3 remastered DVD box set, with the remastered version of this episode.

== See also ==
- Atavachron, an album by Allan Holdsworth that includes a track titled "All Our Yesterdays"
