= Yesterday's Son =

1983 science fiction book by Ann C. Crispin

- Cover
- Author: A. C. Crispin
- Cover artist: Boris Vallejo
- Language: English
- Series: Star Trek
- Genre: Science fiction
- Published: 1983 (Pocket Books)
- Publication place: United States
- Media type: Print (Paperback)
- Pages: 191 pp
- ISBN: 0-671-03851-6
- Preceded by: Web of the Romulans
- Followed by: Mutiny on the Enterprise

Yesterday's Son is a science fiction novel by American writer A. C. Crispin set in the fictional Star Trek Universe. It describes the events surrounding Spock's discovery that he has a son. Yesterday's Son and its sequel, Time for Yesterday, make up A. C. Crispin's "Yesterday Saga".

The book was the first Star Trek novel other than the movie novelizations to make the New York Times Bestseller List.

== Plot ==
While studying the archaeological records of the now-destroyed planet Sarpeidon, a scholar aboard the USS Enterprise finds pictures of an ice-age cave painting that depicts a Vulcan face. Spock realizes that his involvement with Zarabeth in the episode "All Our Yesterdays" resulted in the birth of a child. Along with Captain Kirk and Dr. McCoy, he uses the Guardian of Forever (featured in the episode "The City on the Edge of Forever") to journey back into Sarpeidon's past and rescue his son. Due to a miscalculation, they find a young man of twenty-eight instead of a child, who tells them that his name is Zar and that his mother Zarabeth died in an accident many years before. Spock introduces himself but refuses to allow Zar to call him "Father."

Zar returns to the Enterprise and passes as a distant relative of Spock, who oversees his education and attempts to train him in Vulcan telepathic techniques. They discover that Zar is an unusually strong telepath for a Vulcan; he can establish contact without touching the other person. Zar becomes conflicted and hurt by his father's apparent refusal to acknowledge him.

The Enterprise is called back to the planet Gateway to protect the Guardian of Forever from a Romulan intelligence raid. It is imperative to the security of the United Federation of Planets that the Romulans not discover the Guardian's powers; if they cannot be driven away, Gateway must be destroyed. The Romulans, who have landed near the Guardian, have hidden themselves behind a ground-based cloaking device. Spock devises a plan to place a force field around the Guardian. Zar volunteers to help Spock place the force field, because he can sense whether Romulans are present even though, due to the cloaking device, he cannot see them. Their first try is unsuccessful, but when they rendezvous with Kirk the three discover they are trapped on the planet while the Enterprise with Scotty in command battles the Romulans. They decide to try again, but Spock disables Zar with the Vulcan nerve pinch, wishing to spare him from danger. Kirk and Spock are captured and tortured by the Romulans. When Zar wakes up, he is able to telepathically sense their danger. He also realizes that his father cares about him, since he chose to protect Zar instead of Kirk, his closest friend. The Enterprise defeats the Romulan ships and a rescue party beams down. Zar creates a diversion by causing an explosion, allowing the others to rescue Kirk and Spock.

Once the Romulan threat is over, Zar decides to use the Guardian to return to Sarpeidon's past, but to a more settled location than the one he originally inhabited. He has discovered evidence that he is crucial to the planet's unusually rapid cultural evolution.

== Characters ==
- Mr. Spock
- Zar
- Captain James T. Kirk
- Dr. Leonard McCoy
- Montgomery Scott
- Romulan Commander Tal
- Guardian of Forever

== Background ==
Crispin was a fan of Star Trek and had read many of the novelizations by James Blish. Crispin loved Roddenberry's optimism for the future and was inspired by the strong and capable Vulcans who nonetheless chose to embrace pacifism. She wrote Yesterday's Son on a whim, "it seemed to me when I watched "All Our Yesterdays" that the episode cried out for a sequel... so I sat down and wrote it." She did a little research on survival in arctic regions but mostly used established settings and relied on what she already knew from the show. It took Pocket Books three years to accept Crispin's draft due to the large amount of submissions being received.

Crispin commented on the success of the book "I think readers were hungry in that era for stories that explored the inner lives of the Trek characters, and my book did that."

== Other versions ==
The book was also released in an audiobook adaptation read by James Doohan and Leonard Nimoy. Doohan told Crispin he had read and enjoyed the book even before he had been asked to work on the audiobook.

== Reception ==
Ellen Cheeseman-Meyer of Tor.com described the "Yesterday Saga" as "both precious and hilarious."
