= Surak =

- Star Trek character
- Barry Atwater as Surak
- First appearance: "The Savage Curtain" (1969) (The Original Series)
- Last appearance: "Kir'Shara" (2004) (Enterprise)
- Portrayed by: Barry Atwater and Bruce Gray

In-universe information
- Species: Vulcan

Surak is a fictional character in the backstory of the Star Trek television series and franchises. He is portrayed as the most important philosopher in the history of the planet Vulcan. During an Earth-like "modern age", when the Vulcans are technological but emotionally driven and violent, Surak founds a movement which reforms the Vulcan way of thinking and lifestyle and leads to the world of logically-reasoning and emotion-suppressing Vulcans known from the TV series. This period in Vulcan history is referred to as the "Time of Awakening".

The "Time of Awakening" is accompanied by violence unmatched in Vulcan history, according to the Star Trek: Enterprise episode "Awakening" (wherein Surak's mind is resurrected 1,800 years after his death to restore to modern Vulcans an uncorrupted version of his original philosophy). During the "Time of Awakening" a Vulcan schism of those who "sought a return to savage ways" and "marched beneath the raptor's wings" (later the symbol of the Romulan people) perpetrate a cataclysmic nuclear attack upon Surak and his enlightened society. Soon after Surak's death, these Vulcan recidivists abandon their homeworld to colonize the planets Romulus and Remus, forming what later comes to be known as the Romulan Star Empire. While Surak's philosophy of peace and logic survives for the next 2,000 years only as an underground movement within the emotional, warlike Romulan society (until further shepherded, in the Next Generation episode "Unification", by the elderly Ambassador Spock in the role of a latter-day successor to Surak), it continues to flourish on Vulcan to become its predominant philosophy.

The "Time of Awakening" and its "ironic violence" noted by Surak, which ends in nuclear holocaust but philosophical maturity, was written by Star Trek creators with intentional parallels to modern human society—particularly what they saw as its historical progression toward cultural enlightenment, reason and tolerance interrupted by extreme bouts of cultural regression, irrationalism and fanatical violence.

== Depiction ==
Bruce Gray as Surak observing Vulcan's nuclear holocaust.

The character of Surak in the Star Trek television series backstory, after up-ending the Vulcan people's violent tribalism with a philosophy of communal commitment to reason and logic, dies in the 4th century AD (based upon Earth's calendar, approximately 1,800 years before the events of the Star Trek: Enterprise episode "Awakening"), apparently of radiation poisoning caused by a nuclear attack that devastates Vulcan. It's mentioned that his death was shortly before the final battle between the Vulcans and their enemies. His spirit, or katra, is transferred into a crystalline urn which remains entombed and undisturbed until its rediscovery after two millennia by a Vulcan character, Syrran, in the 22nd century. Syrran places Surak's katra within his own mind, which leads Syrran to create a group called Syrranites dedicated to returning Vulcan civilization to the true teachings of Surak. A decade later, in 2154 prior to the outbreak of impending Vulcan civil war, Syrran is killed while escorting the characters of Captain Jonathan Archer and T'Pol to his group's headquarters in the Vulcan Forge. Before dying of his wounds, Syrran places Surak's katra into Archer's mind.

Experiencing a hallucination (or vision), Archer finds himself conversing with Surak within his own mind. Together, they witness the nuclear explosion that had occurred on Vulcan 1,800 years earlier, causing Surak's apparent death by radiation poisoning. It is implied that those elements responsible for setting off the nuclear attack are a splinter group of Vulcans that reject Surak's philosophy and go on to form the Romulan Empire.

A subsequent attempt to transfer Surak's katra to Syrran's second-in-command, T'Pau, fails when Surak chooses to remain merged with Archer. Once again conversing with Archer inside his mind and appearing radiation burned, Surak instructs him to recover an artifact called the Kir'Shara, which Surak claims will unite the warring factions on latter-day Vulcan. It is unscripted whether Surak himself creates this artifact, or whether it is later created by other Vulcans who carry his katra. The Kir'Shara is a holographic projector of the philosopher's original, long-lost testament—capable of restoring Vulcan society to the "true path" of non-violence and logic. Archer later warns his companions that the Vulcan High Command intends to attack the Andorians, having learned this from Surak who he believes discovered it from some of Syrran's memories that got transferred over as well. Archer and T'Pau succeed in taking the artifact to the corrupt Vulcan High Command in the Star Trek: Enterprise episode "Kir'Shara", resulting in its overthrow. Surak's katra is subsequently transferred into the mind of an elderly Vulcan priest; what becomes of his katra afterwards in the Star Trek backstory is, as yet, unscripted.

Star Trek author Diane Duane explored Surak's backstory from the character's own perspective, in the novel Spock's World – which depicts Surak's initial awakening and dissemination of his philosophy after leaving his job as a computer programmer in response to a nuclear explosion from a war between mining conglomerates that spreads to T'Khut, Vulcan's "moon" (in reality, Vulcan's smaller binary planet). In the character's depicted internal struggle, Surak conquers his own xenophobia, becomes "awake" to the horrors of war, and develops the pluralistic rationalist philosophy of IDIC ("Infinite Diversity in Infinite Combinations") plus logic that ultimately brings peace to Vulcan.

The character names of many latter-day Vulcan males begin with "S" and end in "k", perhaps to honor Surak, though some Vulcan character names do not fit this formula (e.g. Tuvok).

A character representing a physical re-creation of the "historical Surak" in his youthful maturity—fashioned by advanced alien technology from telepathically-recorded recollections and expectations held by Spock, appears in the original Star Trek series episode "The Savage Curtain", and is portrayed by actor Barry Atwater. The vision of a more elderly Surak appearing in the mind of the character of Captain Jonathan Archer is portrayed by actor Bruce Gray.

The only specific mention of the character of Surak in the 24th century period of the Star Trek saga is in the Star Trek: Deep Space Nine episode "In the Cards", where the character of the Ferengi trader, Quark, hawks a bracelet "from the time of Surak" and in the 23rd century Prime Universe story line wherein Surak is mentioned along with predominantly historical figures in Star Trek II: The Wrath of Khan when the son of Adm. James T. Kirk, Dr. David Marcus, tells his mother, Dr. Carol Marcus, that her name will be mentioned along with other famous scientific individuals such as "Cochran, Einstein and Surak" in reference to her designing and building the Genesis Device.

== Cultural impact ==
The fictional Surak's philosophy of rationalism with emotional mastery and its role as a cornerstone of Vulcan and Starfleet mythos has contributed a distinct philosophical component to the broader cultural influence of Star Trek. Similar to the anecdotal testimonies that Star Trek has inspired many of its viewers to become scientists or engineers, other viewers have adopted Starfleet- or Surak-inspired personal philosophies and lifestyles and founded fan-based (such as STARFLEET International) or "IDIC plus logic" philosophy-inspired "pluralistic rationalist" organizations.

== See also ==
- Sirach
- Stoicism
- Plurationalism
