= The Savage Curtain =

- Star Trek: The Original Series episode
- Episode no.: Season 3 Episode 22
- Directed by: Herschel Daugherty
- Story by: Gene Roddenberry
- Teleplay by: Gene Roddenberry; Arthur Heinemann
- Cinematography by: Al Francis
- Production code: 077
- Original air date: March 7, 1969

Guest appearances
- Lee Bergere – President Abraham Lincoln; Barry Atwater – Surak; Phillip Pine – Col. Phillip Green; Arell Blanton – Chief Security Guard; Carol Daniels DeMent – Zora; Bob Herron – Kahless; Nathan Jung – Genghis Khan; Bart LaRue – Voice of Yarnek; Janos Prohaska – Yarnek

Episode chronology
← Previous "The Cloud Minders"	Next → "All Our Yesterdays"
- Star Trek: The Original Series season 3

"The Savage Curtain" is the twenty-second episode of the third season of the American science fiction television series Star Trek. Written by Gene Roddenberry and Arthur Heinemann (based on an original story by Roddenberry) and directed by Herschel Daugherty, it was first broadcast on March 7, 1969.

In the episode, aliens force Captain Kirk and First Officer Spock to join forces with beings who appear to be Abraham Lincoln and Surak to battle villains in a contest between good and evil.

== Plot ==
The Federation starship Enterprise arrives at the volcanic planet of Excalbia to conduct a geological survey. Impossibly, sensors detect carbon-based life on the planet's surface. The image of Abraham Lincoln drifts toward the ship on the viewscreen. Though skeptical that the figure is the real President, Kirk extends full presidential honors as he transports aboard the ship.

Lincoln appears human, has no knowledge of technology past the 19th century, but is somehow familiar with the Vulcan philosophy of "Nome" (meaning "all", and showing respect for the diversity of factors making up existence). Lincoln's mentioning Nome follows his calling Uhura a "negress" and apologizing; Uhura says she is not offended, since in her century, people respect who they are, and are not offended by words.

Lincoln invites Kirk and Spock to accompany him down to the planet where an area has appeared with Earth-like conditions. Despite the possibility that the livable conditions are an illusion, Kirk accepts, reasoning that the Enterprise's mission demands they accept any offer of contact with new life.

Once on the planet, Kirk and Spock discover their tricorder and phasers did not transport with them. They are met by Surak, "the father of Vulcan civilization", who died centuries before.

A rock-like being with clawed hands and multiple glowing eyes atop a bulbous head, named Yarnek, announces that the inhabitants of the planet wish to conduct an experiment to determine which human philosophy is stronger: good or evil. In this experiment, treacherous Earth warlord Colonel Phillip Green, Klingon warlord Kahless, a practitioner of unethical experiments on humanoids named Zora, and Genghis Khan, together representing evil, will be pitted against Kirk, Spock, Lincoln, and Surak (representing good) in a fight to the death.

Colonel Green offers Kirk an alliance against the Excalbians so that they can all safely return to where they came from, but this is only a distraction for a surprise attack. Kirk and his companions fend off their opponents and run for cover. The "good" group remain resolved that the Excalbians are the true enemy; Kirk attacks Yarnek, but the alien's body is too hot to touch. To force them to fight, Yarnek breaks down the shielding between the matter and anti-matter on the Enterprise, ensuring the ship will explode unless Kirk's force emerges victorious in four hours.

Kirk and the others begin to manufacture spears. Surak, whose life experiences have taught him that persistent efforts at peace are the best course, obtains permission to go alone to the enemy camp and negotiate. Green's group kills Surak and lures the others in by mimicking Surak crying for help. Lincoln offers to sneak around and free Surak while Kirk and Spock provide a diversion. When Lincoln arrives, he finds Surak's corpse and the waiting Kahless and Green, who fatally wound him. He staggers towards Kirk and Spock and tells them to beware, then falls dead with a spear in his back.

Though now outnumbered two-to-one, Kirk and Spock confront Green's group in battle. The “evil” force quickly flees after Kirk kills Kahless and Green. Despite the conditions of a fight to the death remaining unfulfilled, Yarnek announces that the experiment is over. He concludes that there is nothing different between good and evil, because the methods used to fight each other are the same. Kirk explains that the similar methods of how the two fight each other does not define them as the same since Yarnek set the conditions. What defines them is the things for which each of them fight — Kirk and Spock were fighting for the survival of the Enterprise, the others fought only for power.

The Excalbians allow Kirk and Spock to return to the Enterprise. Though the mystery of the existence of Lincoln and Surak remains unsolved, Spock offers the conjecture that the Excalbians, using their apparent ability to transform matter, transformed other living beings into the likenesses of Lincoln and Surak, then tapped Kirk and Spock's minds to create the personalities which they imagined those historical figures had. Kirk notes that the Enterprise may be carrying on the work of Lincoln and Surak, before the ship leaves the Excalbia solar system.

== Reception ==
In 2017, Screen Rant ranked this episode the 12th worst episode of the Star Trek franchise and in 2018 ranked it as the 9th worst.

In 2024 Hollywood.com ranked it at number 44 out of the 79 original series episodes.

== Legacy ==
The costume created for Colonel Phillip Green was thought to have been recycled later as Mork's red spacesuit (but with the white triangle) on both Happy Days and Mork & Mindy.

== Releases ==
"All Our Yesterdays" and "The Savage Curtain" were released on LaserDisc in the United States in 1985.

This episode was released in Japan on December 21, 1993 as part of the complete season 3 LaserDisc set, Star Trek: Original Series log.3. A trailer for this and the other episodes was also included, and the episode had English and Japanese audio tracks. The cover script was スター・トレック TVサードシーズン

This episode was included in TOS Season 3 remastered DVD box set, with the remastered version of this episode.
