= List of Star Trek characters (T–Z) =

Index of roles in the science fiction franchise

This article lists characters from Star Trek in their various canonical incarnations. This includes fictional major characters and fictional minor characters created for Star Trek, fictional characters not originally created for Star Trek, and real-life persons appearing in a fictional manner, such as holodeck recreations.

== Characters from all series, listed alphabetically ==
=== Key ===
Abbreviation	Title	Date(s)	Medium
TC	"The Cage" (Star Trek: The Original Series)	1966	TV
TOS	Star Trek: The Original Series	1966–1969	TV
TAS	Star Trek: The Animated Series	1973–1974	TV
TMP	Star Trek: The Motion Picture	1979	film
TWOK	Star Trek II: The Wrath of Khan	1982	film
TSFS	Star Trek III: The Search for Spock	1984	film
TVH	Star Trek IV: The Voyage Home	1986	film
TFF	Star Trek V: The Final Frontier	1989	film
TUC	Star Trek VI: The Undiscovered Country	1991	film
TNG	Star Trek: The Next Generation	1987–1994	TV
DS9	Star Trek: Deep Space Nine	1993–1999	TV
GEN	Star Trek Generations	1994	film
VOY	Star Trek: Voyager	1995–2001	TV
FC	Star Trek: First Contact	1996	film
INS	Star Trek: Insurrection	1998	film
NEM	Star Trek: Nemesis	2002	film
ENT	Star Trek: Enterprise	2001–2005	TV
ST09	Star Trek (2009)	2009	film
STID	Star Trek Into Darkness	2013	film
STB	Star Trek Beyond	2016	film
DSC	Star Trek: Discovery	2017–2024	TV
SHO	Star Trek: Short Treks	2018–2020	TV
PIC	Star Trek: Picard	2020–2023	TV
LOW	Star Trek: Lower Decks	2020–2024	TV
PRO	Star Trek: Prodigy	2021–2024	TV
SNW	Star Trek: Strange New Worlds	2022–present	TV
S31	Star Trek: Section 31	2025	film
SFA	Star Trek: Starfleet Academy	2026–present	TV

Bajoran characters are listed by family name, which is stated first.

Joined Trills are listed by the name of the symbiont, which replaces the family name.

=== T ===
Character	Actor	Appearances	Description
Tactics Officer	Peter Parros	A Matter of Honor (TNG)	Klingon officer serving aboard the IKS Pagh in 2365. He escorted William Riker to see Captain Kargan, but kept looking askance at the commander because he'd never seen a human before. Later, in the mess hall, he also admitted that he never knew humans had a sense of humor. Regarding his family, his mother was still living, but his father was killed in battle at Tranome Sar.
Tahna Los	Jeffrey Nordling	Past Prologue (DS9)	Bajoran terrorist who comes aboard Deep Space Nine asking for asylum only to escape Cardassian pursuit and begin work on his next attack
Taibak	John Fleck	The Mind's Eye (TNG)	Romulan officer and scientist who successfully "conditioned" Geordi La Forge to kill Klingon governor Vagh of Krios, although the assassination failed. Taibak served aboard Commander Sela's Warbird in late 2367, and his "brainwashing" efforts were part of a larger Romulan plot to disrupt the alliance between the Federation and the Klingon Empire.
Enabran Tain	Paul Dooley	The Wire (DS9) recurring thereafter	Former head of the Obsidian Order and the father of Elim Garak
Juliana Tainer	Fionnula Flanagan	Inheritance (TNG)	A Soong-type android created in the image of Noonien Soong's dying wife, Juliana Soong; at Juliana's death, Noonien transferred his wife's consciousness into the android who awoke believing she was Juliana Soong; later left Noonien, married Pran Tainer and took up residence on planet Atrea IV
Tal	Jack Donner	The Enterprise Incident (TOS)	Subcommander of the Romulan fleet that brackets the Enterprise when she "strays" into Romulan space. After Captain Kirk steals the cloaking device and beams back aboard the Enterprise, Tal sets off in pursuit. When his Commander orders him to destroy the Federation starship, he attempts to comply, but fails because Mr. Scott managed to successfully install the cloaking device and render the Enterprise "invisible".
Tal Celes	Zoe McLellan	The Haunting of Deck Twelve (VOY); Good Shepherd (VOY)	Bajoran sensor analyst on Voyager, assigned to Astrometrics. Despite her evident insecurity, she later demonstrated bravery, refusing to abandon Janeway in danger. ("Good Shepherd")
Taleen	Nancy Youngblut	Displaced (VOY)	Nyrian who explained a new customized habitat to the Voyager crew, as part of the Nyrian's forced relocation scam.
Talok	Todd Stashwick	Kir'Shara (ENT)	Romulan agent who posed as a Vulcan major for many years, working with the radical Administrator V'Las of the Vulcan High Command to force reunification between their two peoples. A "very long time" before 2154, Talok served under T'Pol in the Tomed mission. In 2154, V'Las ordered Talok to eradicate the remaining Syrrannites. Talok tracked down Jonathan Archer in Vulcan's Forge and attempted to take the Kir'Shara, but Archer escaped. After V'Las was removed and the Vulcan High Command disbanded, Talok's position was compromised and he was forced to leave Vulcan.
Tarcassian Razor Beast	None (Only discussed, never seen.)	Imaginary Friend, Rascals (TNG)	Imaginary friend from the childhood of the enigmatic female El-Aurian bartender Guinan, who ran Ten Forward, the lounge aboard the USS Enterprise-D. The Tarcassian razor beast was a winged, furry animal noted for its spiny wings, and its loping way of locomotion. When Guinan was troubled, she'd talk to it, and she enjoyed imagining that she was curling up on its warm belly.
Taris	Carolyn Seymour	Contagion (TNG)	Romulan subcommander of the IRW Haakona. She spotted and chased the USS Yamato NCC-71807 throughout the Romulan Neutral Zone before finally witnessing its destruction due to systems failures. When confronted almost immediately by the Enterprise-D, she denies any involvement in the Yamato's destruction and orders Captain Jean-Luc Picard to leave the Neutral Zone. Later, at Iconia, her "excuse" for having followed the Enterprise-D was to claim the planet for the Romulan Star Empire, but when Commander William Riker points out that neither side can claim anything in the Neutral Zone, she again orders the starship to leave, or else she'll destroy it and the Away Team on Iconia. In truth, Taris is deeply frustrated; earlier, the Haakona tapped into the Yamato's log as it was being transmitted to the Enterprise-D, and has now become crippled by Iconian "malware". When Picard steps onto her ship from the Iconian portal, she blames him for sabotage, but seems satisfied that he'll die when her ship autodestructs. Picard, however, is beamed back to the Enterprise-D, and Riker shares the "memory wipe" solution that Geordi La Forge developed with Taris.
Simon Tarses	Spencer Garrett	The Drumhead (TNG)	Part-Romulan medical technician falsely accused of sabotage during an investigation aboard the Enterprise-D.
Taurik	Alexander Enberg	Lower Decks (TNG)	Vulcan ensign and junior engineer aboard the Enterprise-D. His ideas for improving warp drive operation rankle La Forge at first, but La Forge later sees the merit in Taurik's suggestions and invites him to help test them.
Gillian Taylor	Catherine Hicks	TVH	Researcher and tour guide at the Cetacean Institute in Sausalito on Earth during the 1980s who joins a pair of whales bound for the 23rd century
Jane Taylor	Kipleigh Brown	The Forgotten (ENT)	EPS control specialist killed in the Xindi attack on the Enterprise in the Azati Prime system
Tebok	Marc Alaimo	The Neutral Zone (TNG)	Romulan commander who, in 2364, made the first "official" contact with the Federation after more than 53 years of Romulan isolation. He was primarily charged with discovering why several Romulan outposts along the Neutral Zone had disappeared, but the re-emergence was also orchestrated to show off the Romulans' massive new D'Deridex class "warbird" starships. Tebok ominously proclaimed "we are back" to Captain Picard.
Temarek	Elkanah J. Burns	The Vengeance Factor (TNG)	Temarek was an Acamarian Gatherer and a member of Clan Lornak. During treaty negotiations in 2366, he discovered the corpse of Volnoth, who was killed by Sovereign Marouk's servant Yuta because of ancient clan rivalries.
Ten Forward Waiter	Randy James	The Outrageous Okona (TNG) recurring thereafter	Uncredited human male who worked in Ten Forward in 2365. He served a drink to a Vulcan science officer while Thadiun Okona was beamed aboard (The Outrageous Okona), served drinks to several people in Ten Forward when Data had a conversation with Kareen Brianon in the bar (The Schizoid Man), served a variety of Klingon food to Commander Riker, who was assigned to serve as first officer on the Klingon Bird-of-Prey IKS Pagh (A Matter Of Honor) and was also working in Ten Forward when Riker tried to show Wesley Crusher how to flirt by "playing" with Guinan and when Riker had a date with a female crewmember (The Dauphin; Pen Pals).
Clark Terrell	Paul Winfield	WOK	Captain of the starship Reliant. Controlled by Khan Noonien Singh via a Ceti eel, forcing him to nearly kill Admiral Kirk. Rather than murder a fellow Starfleet officer, he committed suicide. Terrell is also featured in the Star Trek Vanguard book series, along with Dr. Carol Marcus. Together they begin work on the foundations of Project Genesis.
Thalen	Josh Drennen; Christopher Goodman	Proving Ground (ENT) recurring thereafter	Xindi Primate, assistant to Degra on the Xindi planet-destroying weapon project
Thei	Anthony James	The Neutral Zone (TNG)	Romulan subcommander and first officer aboard Commander Tebok's Warbird. With Tebok's permission, he agrees that the Romulans and the Federation should share information regarding the mysterious disappearances of outposts on both sides of the Neutral Zone.
Thelev	William O'Connell	Journey to Babel (TOS)	An Orion agent posing as a member of the Andorian delegation to the 2267 "Babel" conference. His mission is to create mutual suspicion among the Federation ambassadors aboard the Enterprise. To that end, he kills Tellarite ambassador Gav and tries to frame Vulcan ambassador Sarek for the crime. Later, he attacks Captain Kirk before being caught and revealed as an Orion. To prevent himself from revealing any further information, he commits suicide by taking poison.
Tieran	Leigh McCloskey	Warlord (VOY)	Ilaran tyrant ("autarch") who cheated death by transferring his consciousness to other bodies
Janel Tigan	Mikael Salazar	Prodigal Daughter (DS9)	Brother of Ezri Dax
Norvo Tigan	Kevin Rahm	Prodigal Daughter (DS9)	Brother of Ezri Dax
Yanas Tigan	Leigh Taylor-Young	Prodigal Daughter (DS9)	Mother of Ezri Dax
Sylvia Tilly	Mary Wiseman	DSC, "Runaway" (ST)	
Timicin	David Ogden Stiers	Half a Life (TNG)	Scientist from the planet Kaelon II. Had a romantic relationship with Lwaxana Troi, but was forced to commit ritual suicide (known as Resolution) at the age 60 to comply with his culture's directives.
T'Kar	Tim Russ	Invasive procedures (DS9)	T'Kar was a male Klingon alive during the mid to late-24th century. In his adult life, he served as a mercenary and, along with Yeto, was one of two Klingons employed by the Trill Verad to steal the Dax symbiont in the 2370s.
T'Klaas	None (Only talked about, never seen.)	Kir'Shara (ENT)	Vulcan student of Surak and one of the first Kolinahr masters. He is entombed beneath the T'Karath Sanctuary.
T'Lar	Judith Anderson	SFS	Vulcan high priestess who performed the fal-tor-pan ceremony in which Spock's body and katra (living spirit) were rejoined following his death.
T'Lyn	Gabrielle Ruiz	wej Duj (LOW)	Independent-minded Vulcan who defies her commander on the Sh'Vhal and is transferred to Starfleet.
T'Mir	Jolene Blalock	Carbon Creek (ENT)	A Vulcan, and T'Pol's second foremother (the Vulcan equivalent of "great-grandmother") who was part of an expedition to Earth in the 1950s, and credited as selling the patent to velcro, 1955, although taking place after the launch of Sputnik, 1957, to further the education of a young boy
Toddman	Leon Russom	The Die Is Cast (DS9)	Starfleet vice admiral at Starfleet Security in 2371. After Enabran Tain launched a joint Obsidian Order/Tal Shiar attack on the Founders' homeworld, Toddman ordered Commander Benjamin Sisko to evacuate Starbase Deep Space Nine of all nonessential personnel and put the USS Defiant NX-74205 on standby alert. He believed that when the Jem'Hadar inevitably counterattacked, they would not be too particular about their targets. Toddman denied Sisko permission to take the Defiant into the Gamma Quadrant and look for Odo; Sisko's top priority was to guard Bajor. Later, after learning that Sisko went anyway, Toddman decided to forgo any courts-martial, but, with tongue in cheek, promised to either prosecute or promote Sisko if he pulled a stunt like that again.
Tog	Frank Corsentino	Ménage à Troi (TNG)	Ferengi Daimon who became infatuated with Lwaxana Troi, kidnapping her as well as Starfleet officers William Riker and Deanna Troi
Tomalak	Andreas Katsulas	The Enemy (TNG) recurring thereafter	Romulan commander, recurring antagonist for Captain Picard and the crew of the Enterprise-D
Toman'torax	Brian Thompson	To the Death (DS9)	Jem'Hadar soldier in service of the Dominion
Tora Ziyal	Cyia Batten; Tracy Middendorf; Melanie Smith	Indiscretion (DS9) recurring thereafter	Half Cardassian/half Bajoran daughter of Gul Dukat and Tora Naprem
Toral	JD Cullum; Rick Pasqualone	Redemption, Parts I and II (TNG), The Sword of Kahless (DS9)	Klingon, illegitimate son of Duras, brother of Lursa and B'Etor. Sought to become Chancellor, leading to the Klingon Civil War.
Toreth	Carolyn Seymour	Face of the Enemy (TNG)	Romulan commander of the IRW Khazara. She received the Sotarek Citation for prevailing in a surprise battle with the Klingons. She had no love for the Tal Shiar, particularly because they dragged her father (possibly Commander Konsab) out of his home in the middle of the night, merely for speaking his mind.
Torg	Stephen Liska	SFS	Klingon officer aboard Commander Kruge's Bird-of-Prey. He and his boarding party are killed when the Enterprise's self-destruct sequence destroys the Federation starship. He may have been Kruge's first officer, as he assumed the command chair when Kruge was on the surface of Genesis.
B'Elanna Torres	Roxann Dawson; Jessica Gaona (as Young B'Elanna in Lineage)	Caretaker (VOY) recurring thereafter	Klingon-Human hybrid and former Maquis member who served as Chief Engineer on the USS Voyager, eventually the wife of Tom Paris.
Carl Torres	Javier Grajeda	Lineage (VOY)	Uncle of B'Elanna Torres, brother of John Torres
Dean Torres	Paul Robert Langdon	Lineage (VOY)	Cousin of B'Elanna Torres, son of Carl Torres
Elizabeth Torres	Nicole Sarah Fellows	Lineage (VOY)	Cousin of B'Elanna Torres, daughter of Carl Torres
John Torres	Juan Garcia	Lineage (VOY), Author, Author (VOY)	Father of B'Elanna Torres and former husband of Miral
Michael Torres	Gilbert R. Leal	Lineage (VOY)	Cousin of B'Elanna Torres, son of Carl Torres
Tosin	James Horan	Fair Trade (VOY)	Kolaati trader who dealt in illegal substances near the Nekrit Expanse
T'Pan	Joan Stuart Morris	Suspicions (TNG)	Vulcan scientist specializing in subspace morphology
T'Pau	Celia Lovsky; Betty Matsushita; Kara Zediker	Amok Time (TOS), Darkling (VOY), The Forge (ENT) recurring thereafter	Vulcan who led the Syrranite rebellion against the Vulcan High Command, later presided over the Koon-ut-kal-if-fee ceremony in which Spock is forced to fight Captain Kirk after Spock was rejected by his bride-to-be, T'Pring. She is also the only person ever to turn down a seat on the Federation Council. The English pop group T'Pau was named after the character, as was a fictional Vulcan vessel.
T'Pol	Jolene Blalock	Broken Bow (ENT)	Commander T'Pol, born 2088. Vulcan female who serves as the science officer aboard the starship Enterprise (NX-01).
T'Pring	Arlene Martel; Mary Rice; Gia Sandhu	Amok Time (TOS), Strange New Worlds (SNW) recurring thereafter	Vulcan female who was bonded to Spock but backed out of her commitments and married Stonn
The Traveler	Eric Menyuk	Where No One Has Gone Before (TNG) recurring thereafter	Humanoid from Tau Alpha C with exceptional mental abilities, including mastery over space and time.
Travers		Arena (TOS)	Starfleet commodore assigned to the Earth Observation Outpost on Cestus III. According to Kirk, he "sets a good table". Travers was killed when the Gorn attacked and destroyed the outpost because it infringed on their territory.
Trelane	William Campbell; Rhys Darby	The Squire of Gothos (TOS), Wedding Bell Blues (SNW), Like Chronitons Through the Hourglass (SNW)	Near-omnipotent being who toyed with the crew of the Enterprise. He proved to be an immature representative of his discorporate species, and very much a "spoiled brat". Bartell LaRue and Barbara Babcock provided the voices of his "parents" in the installment. He is later shown to be part of the Q Continuum, with his father voiced by John de Lancie.
Trelit	Charles Dennis	Desert Crossing (ENT)	Torothan Chancellor and member of the ruling clan
Trevean	Michael Sarrazin	The Quickening (DS9)	Native of the planet Teplan in the Gamma Quadrant who "aided" those on his planet infected with a terminal, painful, and slow-acting disease known as the Teplan Blight by administering them toxic herbs, which killed the patients without pain
Deanna Troi	Marina Sirtis	Encounter at Farpoint (TNG) recurring thereafter, GEN, FCT, INS, Pathfinder (VOY) recurring thereafter, NEM, These Are The Voyages... (ENT), Nepenthe (PIC) recurring thereafter, No Small Parts (LOW)	The ship's Counselor aboard the Enterprise-D and -E; she also served on the USS Titan. Half-Betazoid, half-Human, wife of William Riker, mother of Thaddeus and Kestra Troi.
Ian Andrew Troi	Amick Byram	Dark Page (TNG)	Husband of Lwaxana Troi, father of Deanna and Kestra Troi.
Ian Andrew (Troi II)	R. J. Williams; Zachary Benjamin; Josh Bell	The Child (TNG)	"Son" of Deanna Troi, (named after her father) fathered by an alien light-entity. After a very short gestation period, 'The Child' grew from infant to an eight-year-old within a day. After posing a threat to the Enterprise-D due to emitting Eichner-radiation, the alien had to abort its experiment and the child subsequently died.
Kestra Troi	Andreana Weiner	Dark Page (TNG)	The first daughter of Lwaxana Troi (and therefore older sister of Deanna Troi), who died as a child. Not to be confused with Deanna and William Riker's daughter, who appears in Star Trek: Picard season one.
Kestra Troi-Riker	Lulu Wilson	Nepenthe (PIC)	The daughter and youngest child of William T. Riker and Deanna Troi, sister of Thaddeus Troi-Riker. Not to be confused with her maternal aunt and namesake, Lwaxana Troi's first daughter and Deanna's older sister, who died very young.
Lwaxana Troi	Majel Barrett	Haven (TNG) recurring thereafter, The Forsaken (DS9) recurring thereafter	Daughter of the Fifth House, Holder of the Sacred Chalice of Rixx, Heir to the Five Holy Rings of Betazed; mother of Deanna and Kestra Troi and wife to Ian Andrew Troi. Constantly on manhunt, she became somewhat of an annoying menace to Captain Picard when she was on board the Enterprise-D, as well as later on to Odo on DS9.
Thaddeus Troi-Riker	Unknown	Nepenthe (PIC), Seventeen Seconds (PIC)	The son and eldest child of William T. Riker and Deanna Troi, brother of Kestra Troi-Riker. Thad would become ill with and pass away from mendaxic neurosclerosis, a rare disease caused by a silicon-based virus. A treatment involving a positronic brain matrix would likely have cured the disease, but the family was forbidden from using it due to the Federation's ban on positronic lifeforms at the time. His death would have long-lasting effects on Riker's and Troi's marriage.
T'Rul	Martha Hackett	The Search, Parts I and II (DS9)	Romulan subcommander who was assigned to operate and protect the cloaking device that her government lent to the USS Defiant NX-74205 in 2371.
T'Sai	Edna Glover	TMP	Female Vulcan Master who was to have officiated the ceremony recognizing Spock's attainment of the Kolinahr. However, when he stopped her from giving him a symbolic necklace of his achievement, T'Sai mind-melded with him and discovered that he was preoccupied by a "consciousness" calling to him from deep space. She immediately ended the ceremony and pronounced that Spock had not achieved Kolinahr after all.
T'Shanik	Tasia Valenza	Coming of Age (TNG)	Female Vulcan who took the Starfleet Academy entrance exam on Relva VII in 2364, along with Wesley Crusher and Oliana Mirren. All three of them lost out to Mordock, who subsequently became the first Benzite in Starfleet.
Charles "Trip" Tucker III	Connor Trinneer	Broken Bow (ENT) recurring thereafter	Commander; Chief Engineer and Second Officer, Enterprise NX-01
Tuvix	Tom Wright	Tuvix (VOY)	The hybrid of Tuvok and Neelix, which was the result of a transporter accident.
Tuvok	Tim Russ	Caretaker (VOY) recurring thereafter, Through The Looking Glass (DS9), Grounded (LOW), The Last Generation (PIC)	The Vulcan tactical officer and second officer (and briefly acting captain) aboard USS Voyager. Becomes commander by 2381 and captain by 2401, and is subjected to a Changeling impersonation before he is rescued after the events of Frontier Day. Member of the Terran Resistance in the Mirror Universe in DS9.
Mark Twain	Jerry Hardin	Time's Arrow (TNG)	The 19th century author, first known as Samuel Clemens, accidentally time traveled when crew members of the Enterprise-D traveled back in time.
José Tyler	Peter Duryea	The Cage (TC)	Navigator aboard the Enterprise under Captain Christopher Pike.

=== U ===
Character	Actor	Appearances	Description
Aquiel Uhnari	Renée Jones	Aquiel (TNG)	Haliian Communications technician at Relay Station 47. Accused of murder, but found innocent. Had a brief romantic relationship with Geordi La Forge
Nyota Uhura	Nichelle Nichols; Zoe Saldaña; Celia Rose Gooding	TOS, TAS, TMP, WOK, SFS, TVH, TFF, TUC, ST09, STID, STB, SNW	Chief Communications Officer on board the Enterprise and Enterprise-A. Her given name is revealed in the Star Trek reboot.
Kevin Uxbridge	John Anderson	The Survivors (TNG)	The alias used by a "Douwd", a member of a discorporate race of near-omnipotent "immortal beings of disguises and false surroundings" called the Douwds. Repentant for the genocide he committed against another race, known as the Husnock, through psychic powers in blind revenge for the death of Rishon Uxbridge, his human wife.
Rishon Uxbridge	Anne Haney	The Survivors (TNG)	The human wife of Kevin Uxbridge, whom the Husnock killed; her Douwd husband Kevin Uxbridge avenged her death by destroying the entire Husnock species in blind revenge over his grief.

=== V ===
Character	Actor	Appearances	Description
Vadosia	Jack Shearer	The Forsaken (DS9)	Bolian ambassador sent to Deep Space Nine to investigate the Bajoran wormhole in 2369.
Vagh	Edward Wiley	The Mind's Eye (TNG)	Klingon governor of Krios in late 2367. He accused Starfleet of supplying weapons to Kriosian rebels, who sought to gain their planet's independence from the Klingon Empire. However, Data and Geordi La Forge discovered that the weapons actually had been constructed and distributed by the Romulans. While Vagh was aboard the Enterprise-D to witness the crew's investigation into the matter, he was nearly killed by La Forge, who had been "conditioned" by the Romulans to shoot him.
Valeris	Kim Cattrall	TUC	Starfleet lieutenant (although she wears the rank of lieutenant-commander on her uniform) and Enterprise-A helmsman who was complicit in the assassination of Klingon chancellor Gorkon. Kim Cattrall chose the Eris element of the character's name, for the Greek goddess of strife, which was Vulcanised by the addition of the "Val" at the behest of director Nicholas Meyer.
Valkris	Catherine Shirriff	SFS	An elegant Klingon agent who stole a copy of Admiral Kirk's summary of the Genesis Project. She booked passage on the Merchantman to rendezvous with a Bird-of-Prey commanded by Kruge, to whom she presented the information. When Kruge found out that she had watched the summary herself, he destroyed the Merchantman. Valkris and Kruge may have been lovers, as her final endearment to him was, "Success, my lord, and my love."
Varel	Susanna Thompson	The Next Phase (TNG)	Romulan officer aboard Mirok's ship who conspires with him to destroy the Enterprise-D. They decide to send a muon feedback wave along the Enterprise's power transfer beam. The muon particles would collect inside the starship's Dilithium core and explode when the Enterprise engaged warp speed.
Varria	Jane Daly	The Most Toys (TNG)	Assistant to Kivas Fajo for 14 years. Helping Data escape from Fajo's ship led to her death.
Vash	Jennifer Hetrick	Captain's Holiday (TNG), Qpid (TNG), Q-Less (DS9)	An antiquarian, with a habit of pursuing artifacts with unethical zeal as a profiteer, who falls in love with Picard. She first appeared in the Star Trek: The Next Generation episode "Captain's Holiday", in which Jean-Luc Picard vacationed on Risa. Vash had discovered the Tox Uthat, an artifact thieves were determined to take from her; with Picard's help, the thieves were thwarted. During this adventure, she and Picard fell in love. They met again in the episode "Qpid", in which Vash became annoyed that none of Picard's senior staff had even heard of her, despite his explanation that he is "a very private man". Q abducted her and the Enterprise senior staff, casting them into a Robin Hood scenario, with Picard playing Robin Hood and Vash as Maid Marian. The result was Vash leaving with Q to the Gamma Quadrant, to scour archaeological sites there. Vash reappeared in the Star Trek: Deep Space Nine episode "Q-Less" two years later, in which episode she mistook for an artifact an "egg", which subsequently hatched as a lifeform at the end of the episode. In 2017, CBR ranked Vash the 11th "fiercest" female character of the Star Trek universe.
Tova Veer	Christopher Liam Moore	Distant Origin (VOY)	Assistant to Professor Gegen
Vekma	Laura Drake	A Matter of Honor (TNG)	Klingon officer serving aboard the IKS Pagh in 2365. She said that Commander William Riker was not very attractive, but that she would "have him". She and Zegov were inquisitive and wanted to know how Riker would "endure" them ... sexually. Before leaving the mess hall, she told Riker that she might be back for him.
Velal	Stephen Yoakam	Inter Arma Enim Silent Leges (DS9) recurring thereafter	Romulan subcommander who was to replace Senator Kimara Cretak at a weekly Deep Space Nine meeting while she attended a conference on Romulus in 2375. Shortly afterward, Velal was promoted to general. After all Federation and Romulan ships were rendered powerless by a Breen energy dissipation weapon, Velal was genuinely dismayed to learn that only the Klingons stood between the alliance and total defeat at the hands of the Dominion. Near the end of the war, when the Dominion pulled all its forces back to Cardassian space, Velal's instinct was to merely "contain them within their perimeter" instead of attacking. He changed his mind when Vice Admiral William Ross, Captain Benjamin Sisko and General Martok decide on the latter.
Verad	John Glover	Invasive procedures (DS9)	Verad was an unjoined Trill and failed host candidate who briefly stole the Dax symbiont from Jadzia Dax in 2370.
V'Ger	None	TMP	A sentient being that evolved from Voyager 6, a fictitious space probe (inspired by the real life Voyager program) from the 20th century that vanished into a black hole and was given life by a race of living machines. The story of V'Ger and its return to Earth to seek "the creator" forms the plot for the first feature film in the Star Trek series, Star Trek: The Motion Picture. V'Ger's story is also expanded upon in the novelization, and various novels, most notably William Shatner's The Return. Some novels, comics, and videogames have strongly implied that V'Ger was the progenitor of the Borg, or was encountered by the Borg culture's direct ancestors. The Gene Roddenberry-authored novelization of the movie consistently named "V'Ger" with the spelling "Vejur" throughout the novelization's text, to preserve the surprise ending.
Jason Vigo	Ken Olandt	Bloodlines (TNG)	Bok, a Ferengi, altered Vigo's DNA to make him appear to be the son of Enterprise Captain Jean-Luc Picard. Bok used Vigo as bait as part of a plan to avenge his son's death at the hand of Picard.
Miranda Vigo	None (Only discussed, never seen.)	Bloodlines (TNG)	Mother of Jason Vigo, one-time love interest of Jean-Luc Picard.
Vina	Susan Oliver; Melissa George	The Cage (TC), The Menagerie (TOS); If Memory Serves (DSC)	Sole survivor of Earth science expedition that crashed on planet Talos IV, "repaired" by Talosians and prepared to be "Eve" when a suitable "Adam" could be found.
Vixis	Spice Williams	TFF	Klingon first officer aboard Captain Klaa's Bird-of-Prey. She's extremely muscular with severely short hair and a no-nonsense attitude. She speaks English, as she demonstrates when responding to the Enterprise-A's hail and pretending to be Starfleet Command.
V'Lar	Fionnula Flanagan	Fallen Hero (ENT)	Vulcan ambassador who negotiated the first territorial accords between Vulcan and Andoria in 2097. She also met a young T'Pol at the Ka'Tann conference. In 2152, she infiltrated the government of Mazar to expose corrupt officials and had to be extracted by Enterprise NX-01.
V'Las	Robert Foxworth	The Forge (ENT) recurring thereafter	Vulcan administrator of the Vulcan High Command. Addressed as "excellency". Until he was removed as leader in 2154, he pursued a radical agenda that was contrary to the true teachings of Surak. He militarized the Vulcan fleet and suppressed the practice of mind melds. He was secretly working with a Romulan agent, Talok, to force the reunification of their peoples. When V'Las tried to start a war with the Andorian Imperial Guard, one of his ministers, Kuvak, shot (stunned) him, thus stopping the conflict and disbanding the Vulcan High Command.
Volnoth	Marc Lawrence	The Vengeance Factor (TNG)	Volnoth was an Acamarian Gatherer and a member of Clan Lornak. During negotiations with the Gatherer's leader Chorgan in 2366, he was killed by Sovereign Marouk's servant Yuta because of ancient clan rivalries.
Vorik	Alexander Enberg	Fair Trade (VOY) recurring thereafter	Starfleet ensign and Vulcan engineer aboard the Starship Voyager. He bears a striking resemblance to Ensign Taurik, another Vulcan engineer who served on the Enterprise-D.
Vosk	Jack Gwaltney	Storm Front (ENT)	Alien enemy in Agent Daniels' Temporal Cold War who joins with the Nazis during World War II, enabling them to defeat the Allies.
Vreenak	Stephen McHattie	In the Pale Moonlight (DS9)	A key member of the Romulan Senate from 2360 to 2374, Vice-Chairman of the Tal Shiar, secretary of the War Plans Council, and one of Proconsul Neral's most trusted advisors. Ardently pro-Dominion, Vreenak was key in negotiating the non-aggression pact between the Romulan Star Empire and the Dominion in late 2373. However, his death caused the Romulans to join the Dominion War on the side of the Federation-Klingon alliance.

=== W ===
Character	Actor	Appearances	Description
Barry Waddle	Charlie Brill	Trials and Tribble-ations (DS9)	Alias used by disgraced Klingon spy Arne Darvin to gain passage aboard the USS Defiant
Wadi		Move Along Home(DS9)	Aliens from the Gamma Quadrant who force the cheating Quark to play an 'Honest Game" with four of DS9 Staff as game tokens!
Darien Wallace	Guy Vardaman	Too Short a Season (TNG) recurring thereafter, GEN	Lieutenant Darien Wallace was born on Altair IV on stardate 22991.6 as the son of Dennis and Laurel Wallace. He was a Starfleet crew member who served aboard the USS Enterprise-D from 2364 to 2371. Wallace's personal information was displayed on a viewscreen to Counselor Deanna Troi in a psychic phenomenon in Eye of the Beholder. The character appeared in 66 episodes and Star Trek Generations, but was never credited.
Tim Watters	Paul Popowich	Valiant (DS9)	Red Squad cadet who commanded the USS Valiant after the death of Captain Ramirez.
Robert Wesley	Barry Russo; James Doohan (voice)	The Ultimate Computer (TOS), One of Our Planets Is Missing (TAS)	Starfleet commodore commanding both the USS Lexington and a battlegroup of starships, later retired from the service to become governor of the planet Mantilles.
West	René Auberjonois	TUC	Starfleet colonel who proposes "Operation Retrieve" to rescue Kirk and McCoy from Qo'noS. Later, during the Khitomer Conference, West disguises himself as a Klingon and attempts to assassinate Chancellor Azetbur and/or the Federation President. Scotty, however, spots "Klingon West" in his sniper's nest and shoots him down. Klingon colonel Worf notices from the would-be assassin's shattered skull that the blood is not Klingon, whereupon West's mask is removed and his true identity revealed.
Westervliet	Byron Morrow	For the World Is Hollow and I Have Touched the Sky (TOS)	Starfleet admiral who relieves the Enterprise of any further responsibility regarding the asteroid ship Yonada. He says that Starfleet Command will take care of the problem, while the Enterprise must continue on her mission.
Weyoun	Jeffrey Combs	To the Death (DS9) recurring thereafter	Vorta male; cloned at least eight times. Confidant of the Founders, he's eventually the leading Vorta of all Dominion operations in the Alpha Quadrant.
Naomi Wildman	Scarlett Pomers (preadolescent, recurring); Emily Leibovitch (baby, uncredited); Brooke Stephens (child); Vanessa Branch (adult)	Deadlock (VOY) recurring thereafter	Half-Ktarian, half-Human female; daughter of Greskrendtregk and Samantha Wildman; born aboard Voyager shortly before the entire ship and crew are duplicated. Dies on one ship, survives on the other. The surviving Naomi, carried by her version of Ensign Kim, crosses to the Naomi-less/Kim-less ship just before “their” version of Voyager is destroyed. She later almost dies while still a relative newborn due to complications of coping with the planet's environment that she and the Voyager crew were stranded on at the time but was saved by the leader of a native tribe using herbs and roots; grew up fast due to her father's genes. In "Shattered", per the title, an adult Naomi from 23 years in the future interacts with crew members from various other time frames.
Samantha Wildman	Nancy Hower	Elogium (VOY) recurring thereafter	Ensign, joined Voyager as xenobiologist, not knowing she was pregnant by her Ktarian husband Greskrendtregk; gave birth to Naomi in 2372.
Vedek, later Kai Winn Adami	Louise Fletcher	In the Hands of the Prophets (DS9) recurring thereafter	Bajoran female, engineer of a failed plot to assassinate rival Vedek Bareil, later elected "Kai" (spiritual leader of the planet Bajor)
Wixiban	James Nardini	Fair Trade (VOY)	Talaxian male; encountered Neelix at the Nekrit Supply Depot.
Worf	Michael Dorn	Encounter at Farpoint (TNG) recurring thereafter, The Way of the Warrior (DS9) recurring thereafter, GEN, FCT, INS, NEM, Disengage (PIC) recurring thereafter	The elder of two sons of Mogh; an officer aboard the Enterprise-D before joining space station Deep Space Nine and the starship Defiant; afterward, an aide to Klingon Chancellor Martok and an adopted member of his House. Federation Ambassador to the Klingon homeworld Qo'noS in the late 2370s; later Captain of the Enterprise-E, then subcontractor agent for Starfleet Intelligence by 2401 and meditation teacher by 2402. Husband of K'Ehleyr (mother of his only child Alexander) and later of Jadzia Dax for a year.
Colonel Worf	Michael Dorn	TUC	Klingon colonel who, in 2293, acts as defense counsel for Kirk and McCoy during their trial for "assassinating" Chancellor Gorkon. Later, during the Khitomer Conference, after Scotty kills a Klingon sniper, Worf notes that the color of the victim's blood is not Klingon at all. The would-be assassin is revealed to be Starfleet colonel West.
Wrightwell	None (Only discussed, never seen.)	Journey's End (TNG)	Starfleet commander and aide to Admiral Alynna Nechayev.
Dr. Wykoff	Casey Biggs	Shadows and Symbols (DS9)	A physician at a psychiatric hospital in a false vision given Benjamin Sisko by the Pah-wraiths

=== Y ===
Character	Actor	Appearances	Description
Yanar	Rosalind Allen, credited as Rosalind Ingledew (her maiden name)	The Outrageous Okona (TNG)	Only daughter of Chief Representative Debin of the Atlec legation, who was believed to be impregnated by The Outrageous Okona in 2365, whereas the real father was Yanar's love interest Benzan, the son of the ruler of Straleb.
Ishara Yar	Beth Toussaint	Legacy (TNG)	Sister of Tasha Yar.
Tasha Yar	Denise Crosby	Encounter at Farpoint (TNG) recurring thereafter	Security Chief of the Enterprise-D in 2364 under Captain Jean Luc Picard. In late 2364 she was killed by an alien entity known as Armus on the planet Vagra II while attempting to rescue the crew of a crashed shuttle. In an alternate timeline created with the USS Enterprise-C traveled forward in time, Tasha lived and continued to serve as Picard's security officer on the battleship Enterprise during the Klingon-Federation war. Learning of her fate in the original timeline from Guinan, Tasha opted to travel back in time with the Enterprise-C crew, believing that her death in battle with the Romulans would count for something. However, Tasha survived the attack and was captured by the Romulans and became the concubine to a Romulan officer and later gave birth to a daughter, Sela. Tasha was killed whilst attempting to escape Romulus with her daughter.
Kasidy Danielle Yates	Penny Johnson Jerald	Family Business (DS9) recurring thereafter	Captain of the freighter Xhosa who was sent to prison for a year for smuggling for the Maquis. Also the love interest (and eventually wife) of Captain Sisko, she becomes pregnant with his child before the end of the series.
Yelgrun	Iggy Pop	The Magnificent Ferengi (DS9)	A Vorta holding Ishka hostage for a prisoner exchange aboard the abandoned Cardassian space station Empok Nor.
Yeto	Steve Rankin	Invasive procedures (DS9)	In 2370, the two Klingons Yeto and T'Kar were hired by the Trill Verad, to steal the Dax symbiont from Jadzia Dax. They traveled to Deep Space 9 aboard the Ekina.
Youngblood	James G. Becker	Encounter at Farpoint (TNG) recurring thereafter	Ensign Youngblood was a Starfleet officer who served aboard the USS Enterprise-D from 2364 to 2366. He was just a background character, appearing in a total of 40 episodes, but the actor was credited just once (as "Ten Forward Crew" in "The Offsping").
Yuta	Lisa Wilcox	The Vengeance Factor (TNG)	Yuta was a member of the clan Tralesta; she was the last surviving member of that clan, and was one of five Tralestas to survive the clan's decimation by the Lornak clan nearly 100 years prior. In 2366, when Yuta was a servant to Sovereign Marouk, leader of the Acamarians, who was petitioned by Captain Picard for aid in dealing with "the Gatherers", Yuta accompanied Marouk, and tried to murder Chorgan, leader of the Gatherers and the last surviving member of the Lornaks.
Yutan	Gary Pillar	A Private Little War (TOS)	One of the Hill People on the planet Neural. Kirk shows him how to fire a flintlock after first teaching Tyree. Later, Tyree orders Yutan to track down two of the Villagers who murdered his wife, Nona.

=== Z ===
Character	Actor	Appearances	Description
Zahir	David Lee Smith	Darkling (VOY)	Mikhal Traveller who fell in love with Kes
Zaldans	Daniel Riordan	Coming of Age (TNG)	Humanoid species characterized by webbed hands. Information about them was included in the Federation database as early as the mid-23rd century. As a culture, Zaldans were easily infuriated by courtesy, as they viewed it as a form of phony social behavior designed to cover true feelings.
Zarabeth	Mariette Hartley	All Our Yesterdays (TOS)	Inhabitant of one of Sarpidion's ice ages who briefly became romantically entangled with Spock
Zegov	P. Flannery	A Matter of Honor (TNG)	Klingon officer serving aboard the IKS Pagh in 2365. She and Vekma were inquisitive and wanted to know how Commander William Riker would "endure" them ... sexually. Zegov, however, never spoke. She merely eyed Riker from across the crowded mess hall.
Grand Nagus Zek	Wallace Shawn	The Nagus (DS9) recurring thereafter	Grand Nagus of the Ferengi Alliance
Lewis Zimmerman	Robert Picardo	Projections (VOY) recurring thereafter, Doctor Bashir, I Presume? (DS9)	Developer of the Emergency Medical Hologram. Began to create an LMH (Long-term Medical Hologram) based on Julian Bashir and unwittingly discovered Bashir's genetically altered nature.
Groppler Zorn	Michael Bell	Encounter at Farpoint (TNG)	Leader of the Bandi people
Cortin Zweller	Ned Vaughn	Tapestry (TNG)	Jean-Luc Picard's Academy classmate
Zobral	Clancy Brown	Desert Crossing (ENT)	Charismatic Torothan leader of the rebellion against the ruling clan on Toroth. Having exhausted all peaceful avenues trying to reform the government, he had turned to terrorism. In 2152, he contacted Enterprise NX-01 in hopes that Captain Jonathan Archer would be willing to help in his cause. After Archer was trapped on Toroth, Zobral risked his life to rescue him, even though Archer refused to help in his revolt.

== See also ==
- List of Star Trek characters A–F • G–M • N–S
- List of recurring Star Trek: Deep Space Nine characters • Enterprise • The Next Generation • The Original Series • Voyager
- List of Star Trek episodes
