= Dinosaur man =

Dinosaur man may refer to either:

- A hypothetical sapient dinosaur such as the dinosauroid, conjectured by Dale Russell in 1982
- Stegron the Dinosaur Man in the Marvel Comics universe

Other humanoid dinosaurs in fiction include:

- Two species in the Doctor Who universe
  - Silurians
  - Sea Devil (Doctor Who)
- The Sleestak in Land of the Lost
- The Voth in the Star Trek universe in the episode "Distant Origin"

== See also ==
- Reptilian humanoid
