= And Then There Was One (1994 film) =

1994 television film directed by David Jones

- DVD cover
- Genre: Drama
- Written by: Rama Laurie Stagner
- Directed by: David Jones
- Starring: Amy Madigan; Dennis Boutsikaris
- Theme music composer: J.A.C. Redford
- Country of origin: United States
- Original language: English

Production
- Executive producer: Freyda Rothstein
- Producers: Angela Bromstad; Rama Laurie Stagner; Roxy Ventola
- Cinematography: Andrew Dunn
- Editor: Pamela Malouf
- Running time: 87 minutes
- Production companies: Freyda Rothstein Productions; Hearst Entertainment Productions

Original release
- Network: Lifetime Television
- Release: March 9, 1994

And Then There Was One is a 1994 television film directed by David Jones and starring Amy Madigan and Dennis Boutsikaris. The film first aired on the Lifetime Television network on March 9, 1994.

== Plot ==
Roxy and Vinnie Ventola are a successful television screenwriting couple, who are struggling to conceive a child. Aside from that the couple have the perfect, happy marriage. After years of fertility treatments, the couple manage to conceive a daughter, Miranda, who falls ill with what is at first believed to be the flu, and then pneumonia. However, the underlying cause is soon revealed when the couple learn that their newborn has AIDS. Soon afterward, the two parents are also diagnosed with the virus. The film follows the family as they struggle to deal with the social, spiritual and physical tolls that the disease exacts on its sufferers.

== Cast ==
- Amy Madigan as Roxy Ventola
- Dennis Boutsikaris as Vinnie Ventola
- Jane Daly as Lorrie
- Jennifer Hetrick as Janet
- Martha Henry as Dr. Moore
- Kenneth Welsh as David Burns
- Richard Monette as Dr. Lloyd
- Dawn Greenhalgh as Julia Sands
- Henry Ramer as Roxy's dad
- Pam Hyatt as Roxy's mom
- Tabitha St. Germain as ICU nurse
- Naz Edwards as Maternity nurse
- Nancy Anne Sakovich as Lena Burns
- Corey Sevier as Grim Reaper

== Background ==
The film stars Amy Madigan as Roxy Ventola, Dennis Boutsikaris as Vinnie Ventola, and Jane Daly as Lorrie. Other cast members in the film include Jennifer Hetrick as Janet, Martha Henry as Dr. Moore, and Kenneth Welsh as David Burns. The film's production companies were Freyda Rothstein Productions and Hearst Entertainment Productions.

Based on real events, the film follows the story of two Los Angeles-based screenwriters who had attended a fertility clinic in order to conceive a child, before HIV testing became routine. The couple's implant was successful, but the family discovered they had the AIDS virus. Vinnie Ventola died in 1991, and the baby Miranda died of the disease only a day later. Roxy Ventola was a co-producer of And Then There was One and she remarried in 1993, to AIDS activist Matthew McGrath, before dying from AIDS on November 14, 1994.

She had become an activist herself and a successful advocate for peer counseling and peer support programs. She was president of the Board of Women at Risk, a support service for women with HIV/AIDS; a co-founding member of Women Alive, a peer group run by and for women volunteers with HIV/AIDS; a founding member of Friends for Life, a support service for heterosexuals with HIV/AIDS; and an active member of ACT UP/LA. Her play, After the Bomb, which was about a post-AIDS world, was produced in the spring of 1994, at Open Fist Theater in Los Angeles. She performed in the Michael Kerns play, "AIDS, US Women: Silent NO More."

Madigan was the winner of the CableACE award for "Actress in a Movie or Miniseries" for her performance in And Then There was One. In her acceptance speech she gave tribute to the Ventola family and mentioned that Roxy had since died.

== Release ==
In the US, the film was issued on DVD via Lifetime Television as part of "The True Stories Collection" series. In recent years, Fisher Klingenstein Films issued the film on Amazon Video. In the UK, the film was released on VHS and DVD. It was issued in 1997 on VHS via Odyssey as part of "The Weepie Collection" series, whilst another Odyseey VHS edition was also issued in 2001. It was released onto DVD in July 2008 by Infinity Media. It was issued as a true story double film set alongside the 2002 film Crossing the Line, starring Terry Farrell.

== Reception ==
Bernadette McCallion of AllMovie gave the film two and a half stars out of five and called the film a "heart-wrenching made-for-cable drama". Diane Wild of DVD Verdict reviewed the film in 2005. She felt the film lost its "emotional effect because we don't get to know these characters as real people". She added: "The filmmakers may have thought the story was compelling enough on its own, but without the help of well-developed characters, it feels oddly jarring. Criticizing this well-meaning film feels like kicking a puppy - a sick puppy - but it's not a particularly entertaining hour and a half, when what should be a heart wrenching story is undermined by a script that treats its protagonists as saints instead of people. Unfortunately And Then There was One is too dated and simplistic to bring anything meaningful to the AIDS on film canon, and it doesn't manage to be a compelling drama outside of the real-life tragedy of the disease itself."

Drew Voros of Variety wrote: "Lifetime has given the viewing public a compelling tragedy in which the disease is a bit player and the human subjects take centerstage."
