= Worst Case Scenario (Star Trek: Voyager) =

- Star Trek: Voyager episode
- Episode no.: Season 3 Episode 25
- Directed by: Alexander Singer
- Written by: Kenneth Biller
- Production code: 167
- Original air date: May 14, 1997

Guest appearances
- Martha Hackett - Seska; Zach LeBeau - Ens. Larsen

Episode chronology
← Previous "Displaced"	Next → "Scorpion, Part I"
- Star Trek: Voyager season 3

"Worst Case Scenario" is the 67th episode and the 25th and penultimate episode of the third season of Star Trek: Voyager. The episode aired on UPN on May 14, 1997. This episode focuses on events that take place on a spacecraft virtual reality system (a Star Trek holodeck on board the USS Voyager), involving a plot based on factions established earlier in the series, the Maquis and Starfleet.

== Plot ==
Various members of Voyager's crew discover a holodeck simulation called "Insurrection Alpha", in which the Maquis members of the ship's crew mutiny against the Starfleet officers. The program appears unfinished, and its author is unknown. As the program becomes popular, Tuvok admits he wrote the program himself, to train his security officers in the event of a possible Maquis rebellion; however, as the Maquis proved to integrate well with their crewmates, Tuvok abandoned the program, believing that it would only exacerbate tensions on board the ship. However, given how popular that Insurrection Alpha has already become amongst the crew, Tom Paris offers to help complete the remainder of the program with Tuvok's help, turning the program into a full-fledged holonovel.

When Paris and Tuvok start to work on the program in the holodeck, they suddenly find themselves trapped in the virtual brig. They are addressed by the simulation's version of the former crew member Seska, who admits that before she had escaped the ship, she had discovered Tuvok's program, and created this trap should he attempt to alter it. Seska's alterations not only affect the holodeck but other parts of Voyager, threatening the well-being of the whole crew. While Tuvok and Paris attempt to survive the simulation, Captain Janeway and B'Elanna Torres attempt to effect changes in the simulation to help them. Ultimately, finding themselves cornered by the virtual Seska and her Maquis crew, Tuvok causes one of the simulation's phaser rifles to overload; the impact ends the simulation, and allows Tuvok and Paris to safely exit the holodeck.

== Reception ==
When the episode first aired in 1997, Cinefantastique rated it 3 and a half out of 4 stars, Star Trek Magazine rated it 3 out of 5 stars.

In 2015, SyFy ranked "Worst Case Scenario" among the top 10 ten episodes of the series, calling it one of the classic Star Trek holodeck stories. A year later, they ranked it the 5th best holodeck episode of the entire Star Trek franchise.

In 2016, The Hollywood Reporter ranked "Worst Case Scenario" as the 11th best Star Trek: Voyager episode, and as the 64th best episode of all Star Trek television series up to that point.

In 2019, CBR rated "Worst Case Scenario" the 9th best 'holodeck' episode of the entire Star Trek franchise.

== Home media ==
"Worst Case Scenario" was released on DVD on July 6, 2004, as part of Star Trek Voyager: Complete Third Season, with Dolby 5.1 surround audio.

In 2017, the complete Star Trek: Voyager television series was released in a DVD box set, which included "Worst Case Scenario" as part of the season 3 discs.
