= In Search of Gregory =

1969 film by Peter Wood

- Film poster
- Directed by: Peter Wood
- Written by: Tonino Guerra; Lucile Laks
- Produced by: Joseph Janni; Edward Joseph; Daniele Senatore
- Starring: Julie Christie
- Cinematography: Otto Heller; Giorgio Tonti
- Edited by: John Bloom
- Music by: Ron Grainer
- Production companies: Universal Pictures; Vera Films; Vic Films Productions
- Distributed by: Rank Film Distributors (UK); Universal Pictures (US)
- Release date: 13 February 1969
- Running time: 90 minutes
- Countries: Italy; United Kingdom
- Language: English

In Search of Gregory is a 1969 British-Italian drama film directed by Peter Wood and starring Julie Christie.

== Plot ==
Catherine Morelli goes to the latest wedding of her father, Max, who in turn wants to introduce her there to a potential suitor, Gregory Mulvey, an American friend of both himself and her brother. Gregory is not to be found, so Catherine starts fantasizing about the missing American based on the face of a man she saw on a billboard.

== Cast ==
- Julie Christie as Catherine Morelli
- Michael Sarrazin as Gregory Mulvey
- John Hurt as Daniel
- Adolfo Celi as Max
- Paola Pitagora as Nicole
- Roland Culver as Wardle
- Tony Selby as Taxi Driver
- Ernesto Pagano as Priest
- Violetta Chiarini as Paquita
- Luisa De Santis as Giselle
- Gabriella Giorgelli as Encarna
- Gordon Gostelow as Old Man
- Tony Selby as Taxi Driver

== Production ==
In Search of Gregory was the last of the four movies Christie made while under contract to Joseph Janni, who produced Billy Liar (1963), which provided her breakout role as Liz, and Darling (1965), the movie which made her a star and brought her a Best Actress Oscar in 1966. Those two films, as was the Janni-produced Far From the Madding Crowd, were directed by John Schlesinger, whereas Peter Wood helmed this picture.

Michael Sarrazin, who was under contract to Universal, had to drop out of the role of Joe Buck in Midnight Cowboy (1969) that brought Jon Voight an Best Actor Oscar nomination due to a commitment to appear in this production. (Ironically, Midnight Cowboy was directed by Schlesinger, the filmmaker who discovered Christie and steered her towards stardom, who wound up winning the Academy Award for Best Director.)

Despite In Search of Gregory being a box office flop and forgotten while Midnight Cowboy went on to become a smash hit and a classic, Sarrazin expressed no regrets for the turn his career took.

It was the last picture produced by Universal's European production company, and was shot in the summer of 1968. The movie wasn't released for more than a year after the production was completed, having its New York premiere in May 1970.

== Reception ==
Roger Greenspun in The New York Times panned the picture, though he did praise John Hurt for being a talented actor. "In Search of Gregory fails not so much from the stupidity of its plot as from the dim timidity of its inventions.... [E]very crucial incident dulls and strains, and does not excite, the imagination."

The TV Guide review is negative. "The film tries to be a Pinter-style psycho-drama but doesn't make it."
