= Absolute Strangers =

1991 TV film by Gilbert Cates

- Genre: Drama
- Written by: Robert Anderson
- Directed by: Gilbert Cates
- Starring: Henry Winkler
- Music by: Charles Fox
- Country of origin: United States
- Original language: English

Production
- Executive producer: Gilbert Cates
- Producer: Dennis E. Doty
- Cinematography: Mark Irwin
- Editor: Millie Moore
- Running time: 96 minutes
- Production companies: Absolute Strangers Company; Gilbert Cates Productions

Original release
- Network: CBS
- Release: April 14, 1991

Absolute Strangers is a 1991 made-for-television CBS docudrama featuring Happy Days star Henry Winkler returning to his first major TV role in eight years. The screenplay, written by Robert Woodruff Anderson, was based on the true story of Marty Klein's controversial decision to have his wife Nancy undergo an abortion to aid her recovery after a head-trauma accident had left her comatose. The title is taken from the real-life court decision that used the phrase "absolute strangers", itself apparently derived from a courtroom outburst by Klein—to describe two anti-abortion activists, one of whom sued Klein to get custody of the fetus, the other to be appointed guardian of Nancy.

The impending broadcast of the film spurred anti-abortion activists, including the American Family Association, to try to discourage advertisers from buying time during the show. These efforts provoked counter-demonstrations, and campaigns of letter-writing in support of the broadcast from Planned Parenthood, the National Council of Jewish Women, and other groups.

The real-life Klein appeared in a cameo. Henry Winkler played Martin Klein, with his wife Nancy played by Jennifer Hetrick. Others in the cast included Karl Malden as Nancy Klein's father, Patty Duke as the appeals court judge (personally opposed to abortion) in the pivotal court case, and Richard Kiley as a doctor who favors abortion in such cases.

The film's director, Gilbert Cates, was nominated for a Primetime Emmy.

== Plot ==
Following a car accident, Marty Klein is advised that only an abortion can save the life of his comatose and pregnant wife, Nancy. Other doctors note that the wife is in no immediate danger, but Marty realizes those doctors are acting on anti-abortion views and want to reach the limit of the second trimester when abortion is disallowed. The husband reluctantly agrees to an abortion because his wife will be at high risk of death if she delivers a baby while comatose.

However, the procedure is blocked by activists opposed to abortion. Marty faces the hospital's ethics board to find a doctor willing to perform the procedure. He must then undergo the legal process to declare his wife incompetent to make her own decisions and to appoint himself as her guardian. Anti-abortion activists challenge him each step of the way.

Eventually a court case allows the abortion to proceed. Anti-abortion activists appeal the case to higher courts and eventually to Supreme Court Justice Antonin Scalia. Along the way, the news media get involved, and the story gains national prominence. The anti-abortion activists seek guardianship of the fetus; Marty denounces them in court as "absolute strangers" trying to take control of his life and his wife's life.

With all appeals exhausted, the abortion procedure is begun. Nancy later emerges from the coma and recuperates to a normal life.

== Cast ==
- Henry Winkler as Marty Klein
- Patty Duke as Judge Ray
- Richard Kiley as Dr. R.J. Cannon
- Audra Lindley as Anne Zusselman
- Karl Malden as Fred Zusselman
- Jennifer Hetrick as Nancy Klein
- Jayne Atkinson as Eleanor Barcroft
- Doris Belack as Fran
- Vasili Bogazianos as Dr. Sears
- Ron Frazier as Davis
- Steven Gilborn as Dr. Dalton
- Tony Jay as Weisfeld
- James Karen as Dr. X
- Alan Oppenheimer as Stevenson
- René Auberjonois as Quinn
- Mitchell Laurance as Stan

== Critical reception ==
In The Baltimore Sun, Michael Hill said the film handled the controversial topic of abortion with "involving style and grace". In The Buffalo News, Alan Pergament wrote, "In his first acting role in years, Winkler gives a very understated performance. He does a good job in the few scenes that detail Marty's outrage against the strangers. The subject matter is the star of the film, not the performances...Tastefully filmed, thought-provoking, emotionally involving and willing to take a stand, 'Absolute Strangers' is a rarity in network television". Others were more critical, with Ray Loynd of the Los Angeles Times calling it a "predictable advocacy drama" with a "lack of strong characterization". In Entertainment Weekly, Ken Tucker criticized the script's writing of Marty's character as too much of a blank slate, saying "To have an interesting movie, Cates needed a protagonist who was willing to commit himself to his beliefs. Instead, he ended up with a movie in which everyone is either a victim or a villain."
