= Jennifer Hetrick =

American actress (born 1958)

- Born: May 12, 1958 (age 68); Westerville, Ohio, U.S.
- Occupation: Actress
- Years active: 1979–2018
- Known for: Vash in Star Trek: The Next Generation

Jennifer Hetrick (born May 12, 1958) is an American actress. She is known for playing Vash in Star Trek: The Next Generation and Star Trek: Deep Space Nine, and Corrinne Becker (the ex-wife of Arnie Becker) on L.A. Law.

== Career ==
In 1979, Hetrick portrayed Samantha in Squeeze Play! (1979) directed by Lloyd Kaufman. She appeared in a series of Oil of Olay commercials. From 1989 to 1991, Hetrick had a recurring role as Corrinne Hammond on L.A. Law. In 1989, she starred in the short-lived television series Unsub as Ann Madison. In 1990, Hetrick guest starred on Star Trek: The Next Generation in the episode "Captain's Holiday"as Vash. In 1991, she starred in the made-for-TV movie Absolute Strangers with Henry Winkler and Patty Duke and returned to guest star on Star Trek: The Next Generation as Vash in the episode titled "Qpid". In 1992, she was in an episode of The Young Riders as Charlotte Rowen.

From 1992 to 1993, Hetrick guest starred in Bodies of Evidence as Bonnie Carroll. In 1993, she guest starred as Vash on Star Trek: Deep Space Nine in the episode titled "Q-Less". In 1994, Hetrick was in the made-for-TV movie And Then There Was One as Janet. In 1995, she guest starred in an episode of Sliders titled "Last Days" as Caroline Fontaine. In 1996, Hetrick guest starred in the third season of The X-Files as Sharon Skinner in the episode titled "Avatar". In 1998, she had a guest role on General Hospital as Veronica Wilding Barrett (Brenda Barrett's mother) to facilitate Vanessa Marcil's exit. In 2000, Hetrick guest starred on an episode of Profiler. In 2009, she had an uncredited role as Sarah in 500 Days of Summer.

== Personal life ==
In his autobiography, Patrick Stewart said that he and Hetrick had an affair, which caused the breakdown in Stewart's first marriage. He said that they dated during parts of the run of Star Trek: The Next Generation and were engaged during the filming of "Qpid".

== Filmography ==
=== Film ===
Year	Title	Role	Director(s)	Notes
1979	Squeeze Play!	Samantha	Lloyd Kaufman	Comedy film
1990	Conquering Space	Janet's Narration	Mark Stratton	Short film
2004	No Regrets	Cheryl Wheeler	Curt Hahn	Drama film
2007	The Poor Kid's Guide to Success	Elizabeth Maerd	Thomas Dagnino	Comedy film
2009	500 Days of Summer	Sarah (Note: Uncredited)	Marc Webb	Romantic comedy film
2009	He's Such a Girl	Whitney's Mom	Sean Carr	Drama film

=== Television ===
Year	Title	Role	Notes
1987	Another World	Melanie	Episode: "1.5762"
1987	CBS Summer Playhouse	Dr. Melanie Wilde	Episode: "Doctors Wilde"
1989	Murphy's Law	Lauren Dupree	Episode: "Never Try to Teach a Pig to Sing"
1989	Unsub	Ann Madison	Main role
1989–91	L.A. Law	Corrinne Hammond	Recurring role
1990–91	Star Trek: The Next Generation	Vash	Episodes: "Captain's Holiday"; "Qpid"
1991	Absolute Strangers	Nancy Klein	Made-for-TV movie directed by Gilbert Cates
1992	The Young Riders	Charlotte Rowen	Episode: "Good Night Sweet Charlotte"
1992	Jake and the Fatman	Mrs. Scanton	Episode: "Pennies from Heaven"
1992	Civil Wars	Holly Reigeluth	Recurring
1992–93	Bodies of Evidence	Bonnie Carroll	Recurring
1993	Star Trek: Deep Space Nine	Vash	Episode: "Q-Less"
1994	And Then There Was One	Janet	Made-for-TV movie directed by David Jones
1994	Diagnosis: Murder	Gayle Wheeler	Episode: "You Can Call Me Johnson"
1995–2000	Sliders	Caroline Fontaine; Claire LeBeau	Episodes: "Last Days"; "The Seer"
1996	CBS Schoolbreak Special	Liz Morgan	"Crosstown"
1996	Profit	Elizabeth Gracen Walters	Episodes: "Pilot"; "Hero"
1996	The X-Files	Sharon Skinner	Episode: "Avatar"
1996	Silk Stalkings	Dinah Wharton; Laura MacElroy	Episodes: "Private Dancer"; "Services Rendered"
1997	Dark Skies	Mrs. Bach	Episode: "White Rabbit"
1997	Perversions of Science	The Captain	Episode: "Snap Ending"
1998	Brooklyn South	Miss Wilcox	Episode: "Gay Avec"
1998	Beverly Hills, 90210	Kim	Episode: "Rebound"
1998	Buffy the Vampire Slayer	Ms. Moran	Episode: "Homecoming"
1998	General Hospital	Veronica Wilding Barrett	Role held from August 10 to September 11, 1998
1999	Party of Five	Miss Dale	Episode: "Fillmore Street"
1999	Vengeance Unlimited	Judge Ackerman	Episode: "Legalese"
2000	Profiler	Ann Wade	Episode: "Pianissimo"
2001	An American Town	Caroline	Made-for-TV movie directed by Rob Schmidt
2005	Eyes	Cynthia Massey	Episode: "Trial"
2005	Alias	Senator Diane Lewis	Episode: "Out of the Box"
2006	Close to Home	Helen Brooks	Episode: "Reasonable Doubts"
2007	Criminal Minds	Mary Wilkinson	Episode: "Birthright"
2008	NCIS	Dr. Donna Dunlap	Episode: "Tribes"
2008	Cold Case	Lana Wilkes	Episode: "Wednesday's Women"
2008	Prison Break	Elaine Baker	Episode: "The Legend"
2009	24	Prion Variant #5	Episode: "Day 7: 3:00 a.m.-4:00 a.m."
2009	Raising the Bar	Susanne Dupois	Episode: "Fine and Dandy"
2010	Elf Sparkle and the Special Red Dress	Elf Holly (voice)	Made-for-TV movie directed by Edward Faulkner & Dave Moody
2018	Code Black	Mrs. Berlinger	Episode: "As Night Comes and I'm Breathing"
