= Fallen Hero =

- Star Trek: Enterprise episode
- Episode no.: Season 1 Episode 23
- Directed by: Patrick Norris
- Story by: Rick Berman; Brannon Braga; Chris Black
- Teleplay by: Alan Cross
- Production code: 123
- Original air date: May 8, 2002

Guest appearances
- John Rubinstein - Mazarite Captain; Vaughn Armstrong - Admiral Forrest; Fionnula Flanagan - Ambassador V'Lar; J. Michael Flynn - Mazarite Official; Dennis Howard - Vulcan Captain

Episode chronology
← Previous "Vox Sola"	Next → "Desert Crossing"
- Star Trek: Enterprise season 1

"Fallen Hero" is the twenty-third aired episode (production #123) of the television series Star Trek: Enterprise. The episode first aired May 8, 2002, on UPN as a double-bill followed by "Desert Crossing".

Captain Archer is ordered to transport Vulcan Ambassador V'Lar from a planet where her integrity has been called into question.

== Plot ==
After ten months without a break, Sub-Commander T'Pol notes efficiency on board Enterprise is down, and suggests shore leave on Risa. Captain Archer agrees. En route, Archer receives a transmission from Admiral Forrest, informing him of a Vulcan Ambassador in need of extradition. With the closest Vulcan starship over a week away Enterprise is ordered to retrieve and deliver her to the Vulcan cruiser Sh'Raan.

Arriving at Mazar, Archer and T'Pol are surprised to hear the Ambassador has been expelled for abuse of her position. Archer is called to the bridge and speaks to a Mazarite captain who requests that V'Lar be returned for further questioning. Archer stalls for time to contact Starfleet, but the Mazarite ship opens fire. The Enterprise's phase cannons disable the enemy ship's engines, allowing Enterprise to escape. Confronting V'Lar, Archer finds her unwilling to reveal more, stating that it is a matter for Vulcan High Command only. Petulant about the history of Vulcans withholding information, Archer orders Ensign Mayweather to set a course to return V'Lar to the terrorists on Mazar.

Later, after speaking with V'Lar in private, T'Pol persuades Archer to turn around – again – to rendezvous with the Sh'Raan. However, having backtracked towards Mazar, Archer has placed Enterprise close enough for the Mazarites to attack with three ships. Archer opts to flee, but even at Warp 5, the Mazarite ships still gain steadily. V'Lar suddenly confesses that her reputation was intentionally sullied to make the Mazarites believe she would no longer be a credible witness against corrupt officials. V'Lar offers to surrender herself for the safety of the crew, but Archer refuses. Again stalling for time, Archer informs the Mazarites that V'Lar suffered injuries and is in critical condition, allowing them to board Enterprise. The Sh'Raan arrives and threatens to destroy the Mazarite ships unless they surrender immediately. At this point, Archer's ruse is revealed, and V'Lar appears unharmed. A grateful V'Lar tells Archer and T'Pol that their bond of trust and friendship bodes well for future human-Vulcan relations.

== Production ==
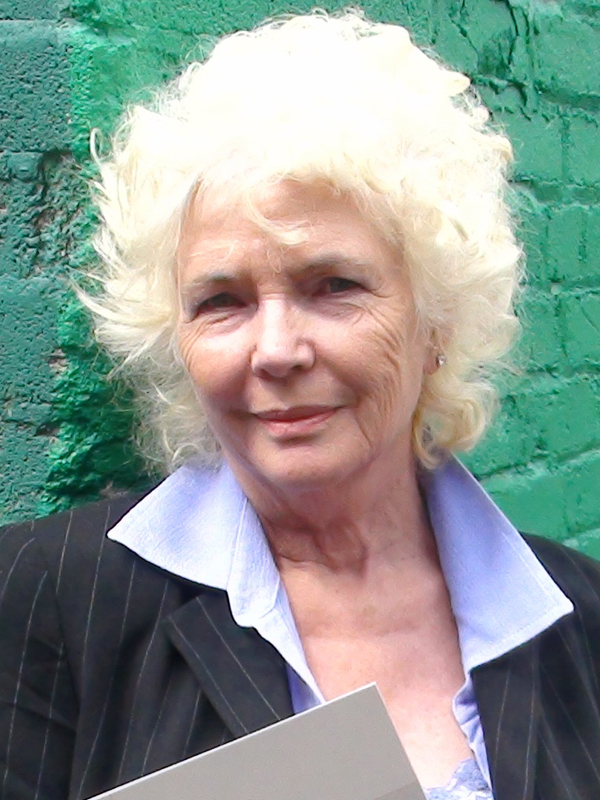
Guest star Fionnula Flanagan

The story began with the idea of a disgraced Vulcan ambassador to be ferried home. Writer Chris Black suggested "what if we make it a woman and someone who had been an idol of T'Pol's?'" The show had been criticized for the inconsistent characterization of the Vulcans, the lies and deception in '"The Andorian Incident" seemed out of line with what was previously known about the Vulcans, but Black felt there was a logic to their acting in their own self interest when they needed to. Black felt that "Fallen Hero" provides balance by showing a Vulcan "who's noble, who is self-sacrificing, who—when confronted by Archer—tells him the truth because he deserves to know". Black said the episode was one of his favorites; he particularly liked the detail that the ship was pushed to Warp 5 for the first time and that Trip was stressed about the engine ("I don't know how much more I can give you") as fun homage to Scotty in the original series. He also said that V'Lar's comments about there being "a great bond" between Archer and T'Pol was a nod to the relationship between Kirk and Spock in the original series.

Guest star Fionnula Flanagan played Ambassador V'Lar. Flanagan was offered the part without having to audition. She previously made guest appearances on Star Trek: The Next Generation in the episode "Inheritance" (as Juliana Soong, Data's "mother"), and on Star Trek: Deep Space Nine in the episode "Dax". Bakula compared her character Ambassador V'Lar to Indira Gandhi and praised her performance: "She is incredible. She has this whole thing with T'Pol and me. It's a really good episode." She found it challenging to play such an emotionally reserved character, a change from the roles she usually plays that have a lot of emotion attached to them. She found the role interesting as the character was both tough and also affectionate. John Rubinstein, who plays the Mazarite Captain previously appeared in the Voyager episode "The 37's" as John Evansville. J. Michael Flynn previously appeared in Star Trek:The Next Generation "The Hunted" and would return in a recurring role in season 4 as the Romulan scientist Nijil.

The episode featured a Vulcan spaceship, a Suurok-class combat cruiser called the Sh'Raan. The ship was based on a design by Doug Drexler, revised and updated by Pierre Drolet. It was ranked as the 22nd most powerful spacecraft of the Star Trek franchise by CNET in 2016, and the 14th best spacecraft of Star Trek by Space.com in 2017. The Sh'Raan class starship made an appearance in the Star Trek book The Romulan War: Beneath the Raptor's Wing by Michael A. Martin.

== Reception ==
"Fallen Hero" first aired May 8, 2002, on UPN as a double-bill followed by "Desert Crossing". According to Nielsen Media Research, it received a 3.2/5 rating share among adults. It had an average of 5.34 million viewers.

Michelle Erica Green of TrekNation wrote: "despite lots of space battles and some verbal fireworks, it plods." Green praised guest star Fionnula Flanagan for her memorable performance as V'Lar, and said John Rubinstein was delightfully menacing as the Mazarite captain, and that they gave the episode some entertaining moments, but was critical of how the regular cast were used. Keith DeCandido of Tor.com gave it 7 out of 10, in his 2022 rewatch.

In 2021, The Digital Fix said this was a "strong episode" that explores the Vulcans interactions with humans, centering on a Vulcan Ambassador played by guest actress Fionnula Flanagan.

== Home media ==
This episode was released as part of Enterprise season one, which was released in high definition on Blu-ray disc on March 26, 2013; the set has 1080p video and a DTS-HD Master Audio sound track.
