= Harry in Your Pocket =

1973 film by Bruce Geller

- original film poster
- Directed by: Bruce Geller
- Written by: James Buchanan; Ronald Austin
- Produced by: Bruce Geller; Alan Godfrey
- Starring: James Coburn; Michael Sarrazin; Trish Van Devere; Walter Pidgeon
- Cinematography: Fred J. Koenekamp
- Music by: Lalo Schifrin
- Distributed by: United Artists
- Release date: 1973
- Running time: 103 minutes
- Country: United States
- Language: English
- Box office: $1,500,000 (US/ Canada rentals)

Harry in Your Pocket is a 1973 American comedy-drama film, about a team of professional pickpockets written by James Buchanan and Ronald Austin and directed by Bruce Geller, starring James Coburn, Michael Sarrazin, Trish Van Devere and Walter Pidgeon. Prior to release, the film was titled Harry Never Holds.

The movie was filmed in Victoria, British Columbia, Salt Lake City, Utah and Seattle, Washington with the then-mayor of Seattle, Wes Uhlman, contributing a cameo appearance.

== Plot ==
At an airport, a dapper man, Casey (Walter Pidgeon), picks the pocket of a deaf man, relieving him of his wallet. Casey then meets his old friend Harry (James Coburn) at his arrival gate.

Ray Houlihan (Michael Sarrazin) is an amateur pickpocket making various, obviously inept attempts to steal watches and wallets in Seattle's Union Station. Sandy Coletto (Trish Van Devere), waiting for a train to Chicago, watches him with amusement, securing her own possessions when Ray sits close by. He does, however, manage to get away with her wristwatch, though she chases him down to get him to confess. While talking with Ray, however, her purse and suitcase, both unwatched, are spirited away by an unseen thief.

Bereft of all her possessions and money, she's stranded in Seattle. Ray promises to help her get back on her way, but his means of raising funds is to sell his inventory of stolen watches– watches so poor that the fence is willing to pay only a fraction of the money Ray promised Sandy. In the meantime, the two have gotten interested in each other and become boyfriend and girlfriend.

As a favor, the fence tips Ray off to the presence of a recruiter for a "wire mob"–a traveling professional pick-pocketing band–in town, who will be hanging out at a restaurant in the Pioneer Square district. Ray decides to try it out; Sandy, who's formed an emotional bond with Ray, decides to tag along. At the restaurant they meet Casey, who introduces them to Harry, Casey's protégé and "cannon"–the term for a known and skilled professional pickpocket.

After discussion and doubts on Harry's part (Sandy proves something of a natural as she was able to lift Casey's cigarette case undetected), Sandy and Ray are given money to buy better clothes and Harry and Casey begin to train them in the parts they're to play – principally that of the "stall," or the members of the team who will provide distraction in order for Harry to get into the mark and make the "dip".

Harry also inculcates them into the group's modus operandi and operations. The team travels "first-class – everything the best … the best food, the best clothes, the best hotels". In this way they are able to blend into and appear as the classes they are trying to pickpocket. Sandy, being physically attractive, gives the team added advantages in that male marks can presumably mostly have their attention diverted by an attractive young lady in revealing fashions.

The mob travels from Seattle to Victoria BC to Salt Lake City, Sandy and Ray becoming progressively more adept in their roles. Along the way, Ray's ambition to become more than a mere "stall" and the tension between Ray and Harry brought on by the presence of Sandy produce stresses on the group but, by the time the team arrives in Salt Lake City the wire mob have merged into a more-or-less cohesive and successful unit. In the meantime, though, Ray's ambition has gotten him, through ingratiation, to convince Casey to take him on as a student. Casey's training turns Ray into a much more accomplished pickpocket and, when in Salt Lake City, Ray and Sandy begin working on their own time and keeping the take. Moreover, Ray keeps the ID and effects of the people he lifts from, wanting to study them, two things that threaten the survival of the group and makes Harry furious with Ray.

Events come to a head in Salt Lake City when Casey is arrested when a botched handoff from Ray allows the victim to see his wallet in plain sight protruding from Casey's jacket pocket. Casey's case turns complicated when cocaine is found on him and becomes more than just a case of springing him from jail on a pickpocketing charge. Harry decides to raise extra funds quickly by hitting a regional horse show at the Salt Palace arena (admitting that the take could be high – but also the risk), and Ray, who had decided to split from the group, agrees to go in for Casey's sake. Working over the Salt Palace crowd goes rather smoothly, but building security have been alerted that Harry is in town and it's only a matter of time before they catch him – deliberately taking the fall by attempting to drop the wallet in a wastebasket rather than handing off to Ray, but is arrested before he can dispose of the evidence.

Sandy and Ray, above suspicion, watch as Harry is led away by SLC police and building security to an uncertain future.

== Cast ==
- James Coburn as Harry
- Michael Sarrazin as Ray Haulihan
- Trish Van Devere as Sandy Coletto
- Walter Pidgeon as Casey
- Michael C. Gwynne as Fence
- Tony Giorgio as 1st Detective
- Michael Stearns as 2nd Detective
- Susan Mullen as Francine (as Sue Mullen)
- Duane Bennett as Salesman
- Stanley Bolt as Mr. Bates
- Barry Grimshaw as Bellboy

== Production ==
It was the first film from Cinema Video Communications, a company set up by Bruce Geller, Harold Robbins and Alden Schwimmer. It was the feature debut of director Geller, best known for Mission Impossible and Mannix. Tony Giorgio, who appears in the film was also a magician and pickpocket: he taught the trade to the lead actors.

The film was originally shot under the title Harry Never Holds. It was shot in late 1972 in Vancouver, Seattle and Salt Lake City.

== The ways of the "wire mob" ==
The movie is notable for giving a presumably-fictionalized but matter-of-fact way of how a wire mob operates and its jargon. In fact, it's said that the actors portraying the "cannon squad" (police anti-pickpocketing squad) in Seattle that tell Harry it's time to leave town, were former pickpockets themselves and served as technical advisors to the movie.

Early on in the movie, when being introduced, Harry bluntly and directly describes the lifestyle and image they want to project. "Everything, the best – the best food, the best clothes, the best hotels." By adopting an air of sophistication and style, the team appears a member of the class they're trying to victimize – thus avoiding suspicion. They also never take wallets at the hotels where they stay, even though that'd probably be lucrative, in order not to bring attention to themselves. Additionally, Sandy's natural attractiveness, accented by fashions designed to highlight sex-appeal, make her a highly attractive distraction.

The movie makes extensive reference to a system of cant – pickpockets' jargon. Some examples:

- Cannon - The pickpocket, the leader of the group in this case. Also, apparently, the police slang term for same.
- Poke - The wallet, the object of the theft.
- Dip - The act of taking the poke.
- Stall - Members of the team, working under the cannon who distract or "artfully stumble" into people giving the chance for the dip to occur.
- Kick - any area on a person where a poke commonly resides. For instance, a prat kick is the mark's back pocket; the patch kick is the outside pocket in a suit jacket.
- Mark - The intended victim.
- Steer - The member of the team who selects marks and telegraphs to the stalls and cannon where the poke will be found.

In the case of Harry's wire mob, Casey spots the mark and communicates to Harry where he'll find the poke via gestures; e.g. if the poke is in the mark's back pocket he'll wipe his brow with a handkerchief and put the handkerchief in that pocket. Sandy and Ray then set up an appropriate stall situation, opening the way for Harry, who dips the poke and secrets it in a folded magazine or newspaper. Harry, as immediately as possible, hands the prize off to Ray, who carries it in a similar way, and Ray relays it to Casey, who retrieves money and valuables and disposes of the rest.

In return for working as stalls, Ray and Sandy get 20% of the group's take. Harry also supervises all transportation arrangements, hotel reservations, and provides "fall money" (bail money to get out of jail on pickpocketing charges and lawyers fees as needed).

=== Harry's Law ===
Amongst the blunter points Harry makes is what is seen as the most important rule, Harry's Law:

Harry never holds. Not for a minute, not for thirty seconds.

This means that as soon as Harry has hit the mark, someone must be on hand to take the poke off his hands, providing cover for Harry and allowing him to go on and hit more marks.

== Reception ==
Sight and Sound called it a "not uninteresting account of the gambits employed by a gang of pickpockets, though much too concerned with the amorous complications caused by a female of the species (Trish Van Devere). In technical matters, the film comes a poor second to Bresson’s Pickpocket."

Filmink argued the film "is worth seeing to watch Walter Pigeon snort cocaine – but, pickpockets aren’t that interesting on screen unless they also sing and dance."

== Home media ==
Harry In Your Pocket was brought to DVD (or any other home video format), for the first time, on May 3, 2011, as part of the MGM Limited Edition Collection series.

The film was also released on Blu-ray on June 23, 2015 from Kino Lorber.

Cinema Retro said "It may seem that a film about pick-pocketing might be a complete yawn. Indeed, there isn't much that happens in terms of plot and the movie relies almost entirely on the chemistry between cast members. Fortunately, everyone is at the top of their game."
