= Q-Less =

- Star Trek: Deep Space Nine episode
- Episode no.: Season 1 Episode 7
- Directed by: Paul Lynch
- Story by: Hannah Louise Shearer
- Teleplay by: Robert Hewitt Wolfe
- Production code: 407
- Original air date: February 8, 1993

Guest appearances
- John de Lancie - Q; Jennifer Hetrick - Vash; Laura Cameron - Bajoran woman; Tom McCleister - Kolos; Van Epperson - Bajoran Clerk

Episode chronology
← Previous "Captive Pursuit"	Next → "Dax"
- Star Trek: Deep Space Nine season 1

"Q-Less" is the seventh episode of the first season of the American science fiction television series Star Trek: Deep Space Nine (DS9), and aired February 8, 1993.

Set in the 24th century, the series follows the adventures on Deep Space Nine, a space station located near a stable wormhole between the Alpha and Gamma quadrants of the Milky Way Galaxy, near the planet Bajor, as the Bajorans recover from a brutal decades-long occupation by the imperialistic Cardassians. This episode features guest appearances from two recurring characters from Star Trek: The Next Generation: Vash (Jennifer Hetrick), a former love interest of Captain Jean-Luc Picard, and the powerful trickster Q (John de Lancie). In the episode, Vash arrives at Deep Space Nine after traveling with Q in the Gamma Quadrant for some time, trying to avoid Q and sell artifacts including a mysterious alien crystal. The episode was Hetrick's final performance as Vash, and de Lancie's only appearance as Q on Deep Space Nine.

Two former writers from TNG, Hannah Louise Shearer and Robert Hewitt Wolfe, wrote the episode. While it would be Shearer's last Star Trek credit, Wolfe's work on the script led to him joining the writing team on DS9. The producers wanted to introduce Q to the show in a seamless manner; when Shearer proposed a Vash-centric story, Q was added to the script. "Q-Less" highlights the differences between DS9 and TNG by comparing the reactions of Commander Benjamin Sisko (Avery Brooks) and Captain Picard to Q. On its first broadcast, "Q-Less" received Nielsen ratings of 12.8 percent, placing it as the fifth most watched episode of the season. Reception was mixed, with reviewers criticizing the imbalance of time spent with Vash and Q in contrast to the rest of the cast, as well as the unnecessary technobabble in the story and the MacGuffin-like plot device represented by the crystal.

== Plot ==
Lt. Jadzia Dax (Terry Farrell) returns from the Gamma Quadrant in her runabout with a woman that Chief Miles O'Brien (Colm Meaney) recognizes as Vash from his time on board the Enterprise. Although the crew is unaware of his presence, Q — a nearly omnipotent prankster — has also stowed away on the runabout. During their trip back to Deep Space Nine, the vessel undergoes a series of unusual power drains.

Soon after Vash's arrival, the station begins to experience similar power failures. In the meantime, Q appears to Vash, apparently infatuated with her. Although Q transported Vash to the Gamma Quadrant two years earlier, now she wants nothing to do with him, much to Q's annoyance. When Dr. Julian Bashir (Alexander Siddig) asks Vash out for dinner, a jealous Q uses his powers to make Bashir fall asleep. Meanwhile, the bartender Quark (Armin Shimerman) arranges to auction off items Vash found in the Gamma Quadrant, including an unusual crystal that might fetch a high price.

O'Brien spots Q on the station, recognizes him from the Enterprise, and warns Commander Sisko, speculating that Q may be responsible for the power drains. When confronted, Q denies any wrongdoing, although he offers no alternative explanation. As the power drains become more severe, the station begins to be pulled toward the nearby wormhole. After a little needling, Q challenges Sisko to a boxing match, and suddenly they are both wearing antique-style boxing costumes. A few punches are thrown by Q but Sisko is able to block the last punch and knock Q down with a one two punch, shocking Q.

At the auction, Vash's crystal receives bids in excess of one thousand bars of gold-pressed latinum. Casually joining the bid process, Q ups the bidding to 2501 bars before bidding one million. Soon after, however, the source of the power losses is traced to the crystal itself. The crystal is quickly beamed into space before it can destroy the station. Once outside, it transforms into an alien life form and travels into the wormhole. After the incident, Bashir finally awakens from his slumber.

== Production ==
=== Development ===
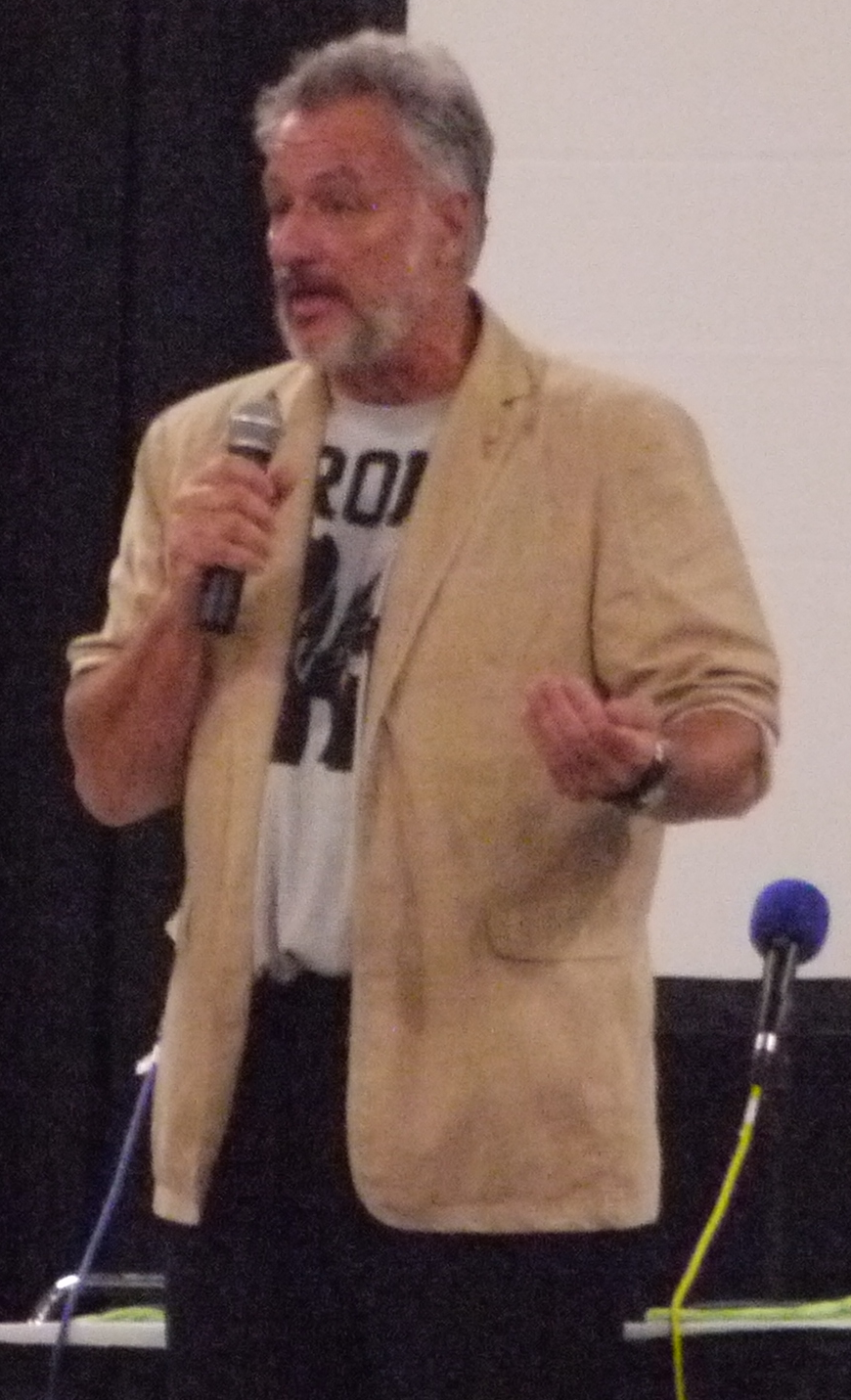
"Q-Less" was the only Deep Space Nine episode to feature John de Lancie (pictured) as Q

The writers and producers of "Q-Less" developed the episode to show that DS9 was still connected to the Star Trek universe. To facilitate this idea, two TNG characters, Vash, played by Jennifer Hetrick, and Q, played by John de Lancie, returned to DS9. Vash made her first appearance on TNG in the episode "Captain's Holiday", and then returned in "Qpid"; Q had appeared in most seasons of TNG since the first season. TNG writer Hannah Louise Shearer, known for writing episodes such as "The Price" and "We'll Always Have Paris", also crossed over to DS9. "Q-Less" was the last Star Trek writing credit for Shearer.

Shearer's pitch featured Vash, who had last been seen at the end of "Qpid" leaving with Q, but the pitch did not include Q himself. Executive producer Michael Piller explained that they had already been looking for a way to introduce Q into DS9, and felt that bringing Vash onto the show would be a good way to seamlessly introduce Q. There were concerns about shoving Q into an episode but the idea of "Q-Less" alleviated them. "If you just have him come on and say 'Look, is this the new show?' it's silly, but this seemed to be a justifiable way", Piller recalled.

TNG writer Robert Hewitt Wolfe, who had writing credits on a number of episodes, including both the previous Vash stories, converted Shearer's story into a script. His work on the first draft led to a full-time position on the writing staff for DS9; Q was added to the story at this stage. Q's motivations were drawn from his previous appearances on TNG, but Wolfe found it difficult to create the interactions between Q and the other characters on DS9. At the time the script was under development, there was little footage of DS9 available. Wolfe could only characterize the motivations towards Q as annoyance rather than any real emotional engagement. However, he came upon the idea that he could demonstrate the difference between DS9 and TNG by showing the reactions of the characters to Q instead.

=== Characters ===
Wolfe believed that if he had written the episode later in the series he would have concentrated more on the established characters and less on Q and Vash. De Lancie felt that the episode never explained Q's motivation for wanting to stay with Vash. "I think Q is best used when he deals with large philosophical issues, and skirt chasing just isn't one of them", he said. Because certain aspects of Q's character are left unexplored, de Lancie found that "the style, the quips and the panache in which things are done become very important".

The boxing scene was intended to differentiate the relationship between Q and Sisko from that of Q and Picard. "Picard is an explorer, and in some ways, very much an intellectual. Sisko is a builder, a different kind of guy. He wears his heart a little more on his sleeve, and he acts on emotion, on instinct, more than Picard", Wolfe explained. John de Lancie offered a similar opinion: "Q's relationship with Picard has always been a battle of wits, but I come into Deep Space Nine, and Sisko just bopped me on the nose! From a character point of view, that's a very big difference."

Hetrick felt that the move away from TNG gave Vash more independence, and she enjoyed the new relationship between Vash and Quark, calling them "kindred spirits". She was also pleased to be working with de Lancie again. "I love the way they write for John, and I loved the stuff we got to do together in 'Q-Less'", she said. Hetrick underwent ten hours of make-up for the sequence where Q shows Vash what could have happened if he did not save her life following an insect bite in the Gamma Quadrant. The experience left her with a newfound appreciation for not having to wear prosthetics like other members of the cast.

Hetrick thought that if she returned to DS9 as Vash, then something could be built around the Vash-Quark relationship: "That would be a really nice pairing, because you have these two different backgrounds but they're both after the same thing." Towards the end of the second season, the producers inquired about Hetrick's availability. The actress was ready to appear on another DS9 episode, but the writers changed direction and there were no further plans for the Vash character. "Q-Less" was the final Star Trek appearance for Hetrick, and the only appearance in DS9 for John de Lancie.

=== Filming ===
Director Paul Lynch compared the production on "Q-Less" to a typical TNG episode. On DS9, the shots were more complex and generally featured more special effects. Lynch said that the scene which showed Q seamlessly teleporting himself from one chair to another, changing his costume as he went, was particularly difficult. The producers, particularly Rick Berman, were determined for DS9 to be the best that it could be, notes Lynch. The comedic elements of the episode required precise timing, with Lynch comparing it to the television series Moonlighting.

== Reception ==
"Q-Less" was first shown on February 8, 1993, in broadcast syndication. It received a Nielsen rating of 12.8 percent, placing fifth in its time slot. "Q-Less" was the fifth highest rated episode of the season, behind "Emissary", "Past Prologue", "A Man Alone" and "Captive Pursuit".

Zack Handlen reviewed the episode for The A.V. Club in 2012, calling Q an "iconic figure". Handlen said Q allowed the writers to compare the different reaction of the characters to his presence in DS9 and TNG. However, Handlen felt that Q was not a good fit for DS9, as the character seemed like an afterthought. Also, the pairing of Vash and Q took up too much screen time compared to the main cast, Handlen noted, while the overall plot involving the "stealth alien" embryo "plays like an abandoned script from early in TNG's run, and an example of a fascinating concept reduced to a perfunctory MacGuffin," Handlen wrote.

Keith DeCandido, in a review of "Q-Less" for Tor.com, praised the relationship between Vash and Quark and thought that it should have been explored further. Like Handlen, DeCandido also felt that Q did not quite fit in DS9, but acknowledged that his performance in this episode was an improvement over his later appearances in Star Trek: Voyager. DeCandido described the boxing scene where Sisko punches Q as "wonderful" and "spectacular". However, he thought that aspects of the plot had too much technobabble; for example, the embryo plotline could have been resolved by a form of Customs procedure. "Ultimately", DeCandido concludes, "none of this matters, because it comes down to one great moment of Sisko decking Q. Bliss."

In Atara Stein's The Byronic Hero in Film, Fiction, and Television (2009), she compared the role of Q in both "Q-Less" and "True Q" as one where he reprises his "satanic role" and "in each case [tries] to lure a woman to join him". Stein also states of the Q/Vash relationship that "Q's demeanor toward Vash is clearly coded as that of a potential rapist. He pushes her onto a bed and shows no compunction about threatening and brutalizing her." In Stein's view, despite this treatment and the feminist stance taken by Vash, Q is treated sympathetically by the writers of the episode. It is made clear that Q could have won Vash around if he chose to, and so the character seemed "sensitive and vulnerable, and Vash seems cold-hearted by comparison."

== Home video ==
"Q-Less" was first released for home media in the United States on VHS on November 19, 1996. It was released in the United Kingdom on DVD as part of the season one box set on March 24, 2003, and in the United States on June 3. The episode is also included in the Star Trek: Q Fan Collective compilation DVD set, which was released in the United States on June 6, 2006, and later that year in the UK on September 4.

On February 8, 1997 this episode was released on LaserDisc in Japan as part of the half-season box set 1st Season Vol. 1. This included episodes from "Emissary" to "Move Along Home" with both English and Japanese audio tracks.

== See also ==
- "Captain's Holiday" & "Qpid": episodes of Star Trek: The Next Generation which started the Vash storyline.
