= Qpid =

- Star Trek: The Next Generation episode
- Episode no.: Season 4 Episode 20
- Directed by: Cliff Bole
- Story by: Randee Russell; Ira Steven Behr
- Teleplay by: Ira Steven Behr
- Cinematography by: Marvin Rush
- Production code: 194
- Original air date: April 22, 1991
- Running time: 45 minutes

Guest appearances
- Jennifer Hetrick - Vash; Clive Revill - Sir Guy of Gisbourne; John de Lancie - Q; Joi Staton - Servant

Episode chronology
← Previous "The Nth Degree"	Next → "The Drumhead"
- Star Trek: The Next Generation season 4

"Qpid" is the 94th episode of the syndicated American science fiction television series Star Trek: The Next Generation, the 20th episode of the fourth season.

Set in the 24th century, the series follows the adventures of the Starfleet crew of the Federation starship Enterprise-D. In this episode, Captain Picard is reunited with Vash, an archaeologist with whom he once had a vacation romance, but their disparate personalities soon have them sparring. The powerful alien Q arrives and offers to do Picard a favor by getting him and Vash back together again. When Picard rejects the notion, Q transforms the captain into Robin Hood and sends him, Vash, and several members of Picard's senior staff to Sherwood Forest.

== Plot ==
Captain Picard is writing a speech that he plans to present to archaeologists visiting the USS Enterprise. Counselor Troi tells him that the council members have arrived and been assigned quarters. Picard returns to his quarters and finds Vash waiting for him, and they kiss. The next morning, Picard and Vash are sharing breakfast when Doctor Crusher arrives and offers to give Vash a tour of the starship. Vash expresses surprise and offense that the Captain has not mentioned his encounter with her to his friends, and confronts him at a reception for the delegates. Picard maintains that his professional responsibilities restrict him from discussing his personal life with the crew; Vash remains offended. After the reception, Q returns to repay Captain Picard for saving him in "Deja Q" but Picard rejects his offers. On observing Picard's strained relationship with Vash, Q decides to assist him by helping Picard prove his love for her.

While Picard is addressing the delegates, Q transports the bridge crew to medieval England. Picard is transformed into Robin Hood and the bridge crew are transformed into the Merry Men. Soldiers attack the group, and the group retreats into Sherwood Forest. Q assumes the role of the Sheriff of Nottingham and reveals to Picard that he has transformed Vash into Maid Marian and imprisoned her in Nottingham Castle. (Note: The exterior shown is actually that of Alnwick Castle in Northumberland.) Picard must rescue Vash as she is sentenced to die for treason, though Vash manipulates Sir Guy of Gisbourne into sparing her life by professing love and promising marriage. Picard orders his officers to remain in the woods, then disguises himself as a peasant worker and infiltrates the castle.

Picard re-unites with Vash by climbing through a window, and the two bicker over the merits of Picard's rescue plan. With Vash refusing to leave, Picard tries to carry her away. A group of guards enter and seize Picard. Vash tries to send a hand-written message to Commander Riker, but it is intercepted by Q, who reveals his true nature to Vash and has her taken away to be executed. As Picard and Vash approach the executioner's block, Picard's officers reveal themselves disguised as monks and create a diversion. Picard and his staff prove themselves formidable fighters and win, and Picard kills Gisbourne in a sword fight. Q returns the crew and Vash to the Enterprise, where Vash reveals that she is leaving with Q to explore the galaxy. Q guarantees Vash will be safe with him; Picard considers Q's debt paid in full. Picard and Vash share a final kiss before she departs with Q.

== Reception ==
In its Star Trek Entertainment Weekly Collectors Edition Fall 1994, celebrating the entire Star Trek franchise shortly after the Next Generation finale aired, Entertainment Weekly ranked the episode as the eighth worst of the series.

Zack Handlen of The A.V. Club gave the episode a grade B−. Keith DeCandido of Tor.com rated it 5 out of 10.

In 2016, Empire ranked this the 50th best out of the top 50 episodes of all the 700-plus Star Trek television episodes.

"Qpid" was noted as the fifth funniest episode of the Star Trek franchise, as ranked by CBR in 2019. They note a multitude of funny moments, calling it a "delightful romp" and praising Patrick Stewart's performance as a Federation Captain turned Robin Hood, as well as the various guest characters such as Vash. Some of the scenes singled out are Worf's protest that he is "not a Merry Man" and Troi's archery skills. CBR rated the relationship between Picard and Vash as the 12th best romance of Star Trek. In 2018, Tom's Guide rated "Qpid" one of the 15 best episodes featuring Picard.

In 2018, Entertainment Weekly, ranked "Qpid" as one of the top ten moments of Jean-Luc Picard. Den of Geek noted this episode for featuring romantic elements, in 2019.

In 2019, Screen Rant ranked "Qpid" the 8th funniest episode of Star Trek: The Next Generation.

== Home video ==
This episode was released in the United States on September 3, 2002, as part of the Star Trek: The Next Generation season four DVD box set.

CBS announced on September 28, 2011, in celebration of the series' twenty-fifth anniversary, that Star Trek: The Next Generation would be completely re-mastered in 1080p high definition from the original 35mm film negatives. For the remaster almost 25,000 reels of original film stock were rescanned and reedited, and all visual effects were digitally recomposed from original large-format negatives and newly created CGI shots. The release was accompanied by 7.1 DTS Master Audio. On July 30, 2013 "Qpid" was released on 1080p high definition as part of the Season 4 Blu-ray box set in the United States. The set was released on July 29, 2013, in the United Kingdom.

== See also ==
- "Captain's Holiday" episode in Star Trek: The Next Generation that began the Vash storyline.
- "Q-Less" episode in Star Trek: Deep Space Nine that ended the Vash storyline.
