= Captain's Holiday =

- Star Trek: The Next Generation episode
- Episode no.: Season 3 Episode 19
- Directed by: Chip Chalmers
- Written by: Ira Steven Behr
- Cinematography by: Marvin Rush
- Production code: 167
- Original air date: April 2, 1990

Guest appearances
- Jennifer Hetrick as Vash; Karen Landry as Ajur; Michael Champion as Boratus; Max Grodénchik as Sovak; Deidre Imershein as Joval

Episode chronology
← Previous "Allegiance"	Next → "Tin Man"
- Star Trek: The Next Generation season 3

"Captain's Holiday" is the 19th episode of the third season of the syndicated American science fiction television series Star Trek: The Next Generation, and the 67th episode of the series overall.

Set in the 24th century, the series follows the adventures of the Starfleet crew of the Federation starship Enterprise-D. In this episode, Captain Jean-Luc Picard (Patrick Stewart) is talked into taking shore leave on the resort planet of Risa, where he finds himself drawn into an archeological adventure with a woman of questionable ethics (Vash, portrayed by Jennifer Hetrick) and pursued by a nefarious Ferengi (Max Grodénchik).

== Plot ==
Strongly pressured by the crew of the Enterprise, Captain Picard reluctantly agrees to take a vacation on Risa, a pleasure planet. Shortly after he arrives, he is kissed by a woman he has never met, in her attempt to fend off a Ferengi named Sovak. Sovak accuses Picard of conspiring with the woman, Vash, who has in her possession a data disc that he wants. Picard has no interest in the quarrel and returns to his room to discover two "Vorgons" who identify themselves as time-traveling police agents from the 27th century, searching for a powerful weapon called the Tox Uthat capable of stopping the fusion reactions of a star. The 27th-century scientist who invented it traveled back in time to hide it. According to their historical records, Picard will locate this object on Risa.

Picard confronts Vash about the Tox Uthat. She claims to be the former assistant of an archaeologist who discovered the location of the Uthat, gave her the disc for safekeeping, and died. Picard and Vash use the information on the disc to determine the Uthat's hiding place. When they arrive at the location where the Uthat is buried, the Vorgons appear so they can witness the discovery of the Uthat. Sovak then arrives with a phaser rifle and has Picard and Vash excavate the site at gunpoint for hours. However, the Uthat is not there. The Vorgons leave, confused because this doesn't line up with their historical record. Sovak, in his obsession, refuses to believe that the Uthat isn't there, throws away the rifle, and starts digging while Vash and Picard return to the resort.

After their arrival, the Enterprise returns to pick up Picard. He catches Vash attempting to sneak away from the resort and surmises that she arrived days earlier, located the Uthat, and devised a ruse to fool Sovak into thinking the Uthat was lost. She reveals the hidden Uthat and the Vorgons reappear, demanding it. When Vash suggests that the Vorgons may have ulterior motives, Picard has the Enterprise use the transporter to destroy it. The disappointed Vorgons reveal that Picard has acted just as their records said by destroying the Uthat, admit defeat, and leave. Vash and Picard have a final intimate exchange before they say goodbye to each other.

== Releases ==
The episode was released with Star Trek: The Next Generation season three DVD box set, released in the United States on July 2, 2002. This had 26 episodes of Season 3 on seven discs, with a Dolby Digital 5.1 audio track. It was released in high-definition Blu-ray in the United States on April 30, 2013.

== Reception ==
In 2010, Zack Handlen of The A.V. Club reviewed the episode and gave it a grade of B.

In 2012, Keith R.A. DeCandido of Tor.com gave the episode three out of ten.

In 2018, Tom's Guide rated "Captain's Holiday" one of the 15 best episodes featuring Picard.

CBR rated the relationship between Picard and Vash as the 12th best romance of Star Trek.

In 2020, Vulture recommended as one of the best Star Trek episodes to watch along with Star Trek: Picard, noting: "It’s not really a good episode, but it’s fun."

== See also ==
- "Qpid", an episode of Star Trek: The Next Generation extending the Vash storyline
- "Q-less", an episode of Star Trek: Deep Space Nine concluding the Vash storyline
- "Two Days and Two Nights", Star Trek: Enterprise episode featuring the pleasure planet Risa (following a recommendation in "Fallen Hero")
- "The Game", The Next Generation episode mentioning Risa in its premise
- "Let He Who Is Without Sin...", Deep Space Nine episode set on Risa
