= Avatar (The X-Files) =

- The X-Files episode
- Episode no.: Season 3 Episode 21
- Directed by: James Charleston
- Story by: David Duchovny; Howard Gordon
- Teleplay by: Howard Gordon
- Production code: 3X21
- Original air date: April 26, 1996
- Running time: 44 minutes

Guest appearances
- Mitch Pileggi as Walter Skinner; Tom Mason as Detective Waltos; Jennifer Hetrick as Sharon Skinner; William B. Davis as Cigarette Smoking Man; Amanda Tapping as Carina Sayles; Malcolm Stewart as Agent Bonnecaze; Morris Panych as Gray-Haired Man; Michael David Simms as Senior Agent; Tacha Simms as Jay "Jane" Cassal; Stacy Grant as Judy Fairly; Janie Woods-Morris as Lorraine Kelleher; Brendan Beiser as Pendrell

Episode chronology
← Previous "Jose Chung's From Outer Space"	Next → "Quagmire"
- The X-Files season 3

"Avatar" is the twenty-first episode of the third season of the science fiction television series The X-Files. It premiered on the Fox network in the United States on April 26, 1996. The story for the episode was developed by David Duchovny and Howard Gordon, the teleplay was written by Gordon, and it was directed by James Charleston. The episode is a "Monster-of-the-Week" story, unconnected to the series' wider mythology, although The Smoking Man's machinations in the conspiracy against Skinner continues the feud between the characters started in "Paper Clip". "Avatar" earned a Nielsen household rating of 9.3, being watched by 14.62 million viewers in its initial broadcast. The episode received mixed reviews from television critics.

The show centers on FBI special agents Fox Mulder (David Duchovny) and Dana Scully (Gillian Anderson) who work on cases linked to the paranormal, called X-Files. Mulder is a believer in the paranormal, while the skeptical Scully has been assigned to debunk his work. In this episode, when Assistant Director Walter Skinner (Mitch Pileggi) is accused of murdering a prostitute, Mulder and Scully investigate to determine the truth behind what happened.

"Avatar" was developed after Duchovny initially suggested having a Skinner-centric episode as a way to give himself a break. Skinner's popularity amongst fans had risen with his increased role in the episodes "The Blessing Way" and "Paper Clip" and these episodes helped re-establish the ground rules regarding where Skinner stood in regard to the X-Files. The episode title refers to the incarnation of a deity in Sanskrit.

== Plot ==
FBI assistant director Walter Skinner (Mitch Pileggi) is given divorce papers from his wife, Sharon, after seventeen years of marriage. At a bar, he meets an attractive woman named Carina Sayles (Amanda Tapping); the two engage in a one night stand. However, after the tryst, Skinner has a nightmare of an old woman in bed with him. He awakens to find Sayles dead, her head twisted completely around.

As the homicide investigation unfolds, Skinner tells agent Fox Mulder (David Duchovny) not to get involved. He refuses to take a polygraph test and is viewed as a suspect. Agent Dana Scully (Gillian Anderson) examines Sayles' corpse, finding a phosphorescent glow around her nose and lips. Mulder finds out that Sayles was a prostitute and interviews her madam, who claims that Skinner's credit card number was collected the previous night.

Skinner sees the old woman looking at him on a city street. However, when he pursues the old woman, he instead finds Sharon. The agents talk to Sharon, who says that the marriage failed because of Skinner's emotional distance. Scully learns that Skinner had been receiving treatment for a sleep disorder, in which he apparently had dreams about being suffocated in bed by an old woman. She fears that Skinner may have unwittingly killed Sayles in his sleep. However, Mulder believes that Skinner may be having visions of a succubus, a female demon, with the mention of similar symptoms of people's bad dreams they've experienced.

Sharon visits Skinner at his home as she is worried about him. Skinner, dismissive, freezes her out. After she leaves he falls asleep, seeing the old woman again. He awakens as detectives enter the house, telling him Sharon has been run off the road and severely injured. Skinner admits to Mulder that he saw the woman during his experience in Vietnam, but passed it off as being due to drugs. It is revealed that The Smoking Man is observing their conversation through the one-way mirror of the interrogation room.

Mulder investigates the airbag on Skinner's car, which was the one used to hit Sharon. Scully defends Skinner to the Office of Professional Responsibility, but it does no good and he is fired. Mulder believes this was done to weaken the X-Files. Mulder, with the help of Agent Pendrell finds a face imprint in the airbag which is not Skinner's. He goes to see the prostitute's boss again but discovers that she has been murdered. The agents hope to use Judy, an employee who saw the man who actually hired the prostitute and use her to set up another meeting with him, unaware that the assassin is nearby and is aware of their plan. They agree to meet at the Ambassador Hotel in an hour. Skinner goes to see his comatose wife, telling her why he could not sign the divorce papers. An alarm on Sharon's vital sign monitor starts sounding, but as Skinner is about to run for help, the old woman once again takes the place of Sharon, beckoning him to come closer. As Skinner leans in, he sees his wife again, now awakened from the coma; she begins to tell him something right before the scene cuts.

Mulder waits in the hotel bar while Scully guards Judy in a hotel room. The assassin enters the room to attack them but is quickly killed by Skinner, who was also there. The dead man's identity is unknown. After being rehired, Skinner returns to work, declining to say to Mulder how he knew them to be at the hotel. After Mulder leaves, he reaches into his drawer and puts his wedding ring back on.

== Production ==
David Duchovny initially suggested having a Walter Skinner-centric episode as a way to give himself a break, although ultimately he still ended up having a large part in the episode. Duchovny felt that Skinner was an interesting character whom the show was not utilizing to his full extent. Duchovny's idea, which was written in collaboration with writer Howard Gordon, also surrounded the conceit that what Mulder and Skinner do comes with a tremendous price. Skinner's popularity among fans had risen with his increased role in the episodes "The Blessing Way" and "Paper Clip" and these episodes helped situate Skinner's position in regards to Mulder and Scully. According to writer Vince Gilligan, Skinner was originally supposed to be a villain, but because Mitch Pileggi was such a good actor, the writers decided to make his character an ally to Mulder and Scully.

A scene between Skinner and The Smoking Man was removed from the final cut due to time considerations. This reduced the latter's role in the episode to only a very short, dialogue-less appearance. Another scene where Mulder confronts Skinner about where his loyalties lie was excised when the producers felt it was too aggressive. The episode's title "Avatar" is a Sanskrit word referring to the material appearance or incarnation of a deity on earth.

== Broadcast and reception ==
"Avatar" premiered on the Fox network in the United States on April 26, 1996. The episode earned a Nielsen rating of 9.3, with a 16 share, meaning that roughly 9.3 percent of all television-equipped households, and 16 percent of households watching television, were tuned in to the episode. The episode was watched by a total of 14.62 million viewers.

The episode received mostly mixed reviews from critics. Emily St. James of The A.V. Club gave the episode a B+. She praised the storytelling, positively commenting on how it revolved around Skinner and his past life. In addition she wrote that the episode possessed some "good scares". However, she felt that the "central paranormal mystery of the episode is handled in a fashion that feels a bit muddled". John Keegan from Critical Myth gave the episode a moderately negative review and awarded it a 4 out of 10. He wrote, "Overall, this episode fails to capitalize on the idea of delving into the world of Walter Skinner. The conspiracy elements seem a bit redundant, and the paranormal side of the episode is a forced and inconsistent mess. Instead of developing something unique about Skinner, the episode dwells on what is already known or suggested, leaving the character in the same emotional place at the end as in the beginning." Entertainment Weekly gave "Avatar" a D+, describing it as "ridiculous" and saying, "The clench-toothed Skinner deserves more air time, but not this USA Network reject".

Robert Shearman, in his book Wanting to Believe: A Critical Guide to The X-Files, Millennium & The Lone Gunmen, rated the episode three stars out of five. The author was critical of the storyline, noting that it "doesn't really work as either a Don't Look Now ghost story or as a conspiracy piece", but praised the acting of Pileggi and the dialogue written by Gordon; Shearman called the former "great" and the latter "so terse and so real". Paula Vitaris of Cinefantastique gave the episode a mixed review and awarded it two stars out of four. She referred to the scenes between Skinner and Sharon as "contrived" and derided Skinner's bedside confession as "simply poor writing". Vitaris was positive of Duchovny and Hetrick's acting, and wrote that Pileggi gave "his best" despite the fact that there was little chemistry between the characters to make it effective. David Duchovny, on the other hand, was very pleased with the episode and Mitch Pileggi's performance; he later noted, "It was nice for Mitch, and I think he deserved an episode after two years. He did a great job".

== Bibliography ==
- Edwards, Ted (1996). X-Files Confidential. Little, Brown and Company. ISBN 0-316-21808-1.
- Hurwitz, Matt; Knowles, Chris (2008). The Complete X-Files. Insight Editions. ISBN 978-1-933784-80-9.
- Lowry, Brian (1996). Trust No One: The Official Guide to the X-Files. Harper Prism. ISBN 0061053538.
- Shearman, Robert (2009). Wanting to Believe: A Critical Guide to The X-Files, Millennium & The Lone Gunmen. Mad Norwegian Press. ISBN 978-0975944691.
