= Naz Edwards =

American actress

- Born: Nazig Dombalagian; February 2, 1952 (age 73); Philadelphia, Pennsylvania, U.S.
- Occupations: Actress, singer
- Website: nazedwards.com

Naz Edwards (born Nazig Dombalagian (Western Armenian: Նազիգ Դոմբալագեան) on February 2, 1952) is an American voice actress, singer, and Broadway star who is most remembered as the voice of antagonist Queen Beryl in the DiC English version of Sailor Moon. She is of Armenian descent.

In 1994, she starred in the TV movie And Then There Was One.

In 2012 and 2014, Edwards was a regional judge for the Songbook Academy, a summer intensive for high school students operated by the Great American Songbook Foundation and founded by Michael Feinstein.

== Filmography ==
=== Film ===
Year	Title	Role	Notes
1994	And Then There Was One	Maternity nurse	Television film
1995	The Shamrock Conspiracy	Dianne Hellinger	Television film
2002	Meet Prince Charming	Leslie	

=== Television ===
Year	Title	Role	Notes
1989	A Fine Romance	Maria	Episode "The Thomas Crown Affair"
1993	The Hidden Room	Natalie	Episode "Refuge"
1994	Hello Kitty and Friends		Episode "The Circus Comes to Town"
1995	Sailor Moon	Queen Beryl	40 Episodes
