= The Quickening (Star Trek: Deep Space Nine) =

- Star Trek: Deep Space Nine episode
- Episode no.: Season 4 Episode 24
- Directed by: René Auberjonois
- Written by: Naren Shankar
- Cinematography by: Jonathan West
- Production code: 495
- Original air date: May 20, 1996

Guest appearances
- Ellen Wheeler as Ekoria; Dylan Haggerty as Epran; Michael Sarrazin as Trevean

Episode chronology
← Previous "To the Death"	Next → "Body Parts"
- Star Trek: Deep Space Nine season 4

"The Quickening" is the 96th episode of the syndicated American science fiction television series Star Trek: Deep Space Nine, the 24th episode of the fourth season. It is directed by series cast member René Auberjonois, who plays Odo. Dax, Kira, and Bashir go on an away mission to a plague-afflicted planet in the Gamma Quadrant.

Set in the 24th century, the series follows the adventures of the crew of the Starfleet-managed Bajoran space station Deep Space Nine. In the episode, Dr. Bashir attempts to find a cure for a centuries-old lethal disease that has destroyed the afflicted society.

== Plot ==
Dr. Bashir, Major Kira and Lt. Cmdr. Dax travel to a planet that has been attacked by the Jem'Hadar, who have made an example of its people for resisting the Dominion by inflicting upon them an incurable disease called the "blight" that leaves spidery black painful lesions on the body that at a random time (usually before adulthood) will "quicken" into a spreading red form that results in a slow, agonizingly painful death.

Bashir is distraught when he learns that the closest equivalent to a doctor these people now possess is Trevean, a man who offers a swift and comfortable death through herbal treatments to the recently quickened. Bashir, with Dax as an assistant, attempts to develop a cure with the help of recently quickened volunteers, but fails when he finds that the electric fields from his equipment are causing the virus to mutate rapidly.

When the others leave to return to Deep Space Nine, Bashir elects to remain behind to help a recently quickened woman who is in late pregnancy. While he administers his anti-viral treatment to her, it appears to have no effect, and she dies shortly after childbirth. However, the child is born without the lesions, as the treatment apparently acts as a vaccine rather than a cure. This gives hope to the people of the planet that by applying the anti-viral treatment to pregnant women, the next generation can be free of the blight.

Back at DS9, Bashir is seen still working on a cure for the disease in those who already have it, but is unsuccessful. Captain Sisko commends the Doctor for his excellent work and reassures him that at least the next generation will be free of the disease, but Bashir does not seem entirely satisfied.

== Production ==
The episode is directed by René Auberjonois, a main cast member who played Odo; it is the fourth of eight episodes of the series he directed.

== Reception ==
In 2014, io9 rated "The Quickening" as the 59th best episode of Star Trek overall.

In 2020, Den of Geek ranked "The Quickening" as the 8th most scary episode of all Star Trek franchise television episodes.
