= Michael Sarrazin =

Canadian actor (1940-2011)

- Sarrazin in 1970
- Born: Jacques Michel André Sarrazin; May 22, 1940; Quebec City, Quebec Canada
- Died: April 17, 2011 (aged 70); Montreal, Quebec, Canada
- Education: Actors Studio
- Occupation: Actor
- Years active: 1964–2011
- Partner(s): Jacqueline Bisset (1967–1974)
- Children: 2

Jacques Michel André Sarrazin (May 22, 1940 – April 17, 2011), known as Michael Sarrazin, was a Canadian actor. He gained prominence with a number of leading roles in Hollywood films from the late 1960s through the 1970s, with a breakout part in They Shoot Horses, Don't They? (1969). According to one obituary, "Sarrazin fit the anti-hero ethos of the era, often playing rootless characters." He was a BAFTA Award, Golden Globe, and Gemini Award nominee.

== Early life and education ==
Sarrazin was born Jacques Michel André Sarrazin in Quebec City, Quebec, and moved to Montreal as a child. After acting in school plays, he landed his first professional role at age 17. He trained at the Actors Studio in New York City.

== Career ==
Sarrazin worked on television productions in Toronto such as Festival and Wojeck, appeared in a taped production of Romeo and Juliet opposite Geneviève Bujold, and appeared in National Film Board shorts. He then gained a contract with MCA Universal, moving to Los Angeles. His early appearances include episodes of The Virginian (1965) and Bob Hope Presents the Chrysler Theatre as well as the TV film The Doomsday Flight (1966) and the feature Gunfight in Abilene (1967).

20th Century Fox borrowed him for the lead role in The Flim-Flam Man (1967), co-starring George C. Scott and Sue Lyon. Universal then cast him with Anthony Franciosa in A Man Called Gannon (1968) and with James Caan in Journey to Shiloh (1968). Fox asked him back to star in The Sweet Ride (1968) alongside Jacqueline Bisset, who became his real-life girlfriend for the next several years.

Sarrazin appeared in some thrillers for Universal such as Eye of the Cat (1969) with Gayle Hunnicutt and Eleanor Parker and In Search of Gregory (1969) with Julie Christie and John Hurt. He was originally cast to play Joe Buck in Midnight Cowboy (1969), but he was unable to gain release from a prior contract and the part went to Jon Voight. He was announced for the male lead in Cover Me Babe, but was replaced by Robert Forster.

Sarrazin's breakthrough role was in the dark Great Depression drama They Shoot Horses, Don't They? (1969). The Sydney Pollack film earned nine Oscar nominations. Sarrazin starred alongside Jane Fonda, Susannah York, Gig Young, Red Buttons, Bonnie Bedelia and Bruce Dern. Of his role, Sarrazin recalled "You could have paid me a dollar a week to work on that film. It hits you bolt upright. I still get really intense when I watch it. We stayed up around the clock for three or four days. Pollack said we should work until we showed signs of exhaustion."

He starred in the youth dramas The Pursuit of Happiness (1971) with Barbara Hershey and Believe in Me (1971) with Bisset. He supported Henry Fonda and Paul Newman in Sometimes a Great Notion (1970), then co-starred with George Peppard in The Groundstar Conspiracy (1972) at Universal.

Sarrazin supported James Coburn and Walter Pidgeon in Harry in Your Pocket (1973) and received excellent reviews for the television film Frankenstein: The True Story (1973). He appeared as Barbra Streisand's husband in the screwball comedy For Pete's Sake (1974).

He then starred with Margot Kidder and Jennifer O'Neill in The Reincarnation of Peter Proud (1975), about a man doomed to die the same kind of death twice. That film was a critical and box office failure and damaged his Hollywood career. Sarrazin went to Europe to star opposite Ursula Andress in the sex comedy The Loves and Times of Scaramouche (1976), which was another failure. He starred in The Gumball Rally (1976). He co-starred with Anthony Quinn and Jennifer O'Neill in the Iran-shot film Caravans (1978), which was a huge box office disaster. He then starred Canadian mystery thriller Double Negative (1980). He hosted the April 15, 1978 episode of Saturday Night Live.

Sarrazin increasingly shifted to television work. He had supporting roles in Beulah Land (1980), The Seduction (1982) with Morgan Fairchild and Andrew Stevens and vigilante crime drama Fighting Back (1982). He also appeared in Joshua Then and Now (1985), the Star Trek: Deep Space Nine episode "The Quickening" (1996) and The Outer Limits episodes "I Hear You Calling" (1996) and "The Other Side" (1999).

== Personal life ==
For seven years (1967–1974), Sarrazin was in a relationship with actress Jacqueline Bisset, whom he met while making The Sweet Ride (1968). Before that, he had two children by an unknown girlfriend.

=== Death ===
Sarrazin died of mesothelioma on April 17, 2011, aged 70, in his hometown of Montreal. According to a family spokesman, his daughters Catherine and Michele were at his side when he died.

== Filmography ==
=== Film ===
- You're No Good (1965, NFB Film) — Eddie (German Version: Freddy)
- Gunfight in Abilene (1967) — Cord Decker
- The Flim-Flam Man (1967) — Curley
- A Man Called Gannon (1968) — Jess Washburn
- Journey to Shiloh (1968) — Miller Nalls
- The Sweet Ride (1968) — Denny McGuire
- Eye of the Cat (1969) — Wylie
- In Search of Gregory (1969) — Gregory Mulvey
- They Shoot Horses, Don't They? (1969) — Robert
- The Pursuit of Happiness (1971) — William Popper
- Believe in Me (1971) — Remy
- Sometimes a Great Notion (1971) — Leeland Stamper
- The Life and Times of Judge Roy Bean (1972) — Rose's husband
- The Groundstar Conspiracy (1972) — John David Welles / Peter Bellamy
- Harry in Your Pocket (1973) — Ray Haulihan
- Frankenstein: The True Story (1973) — The Creature
- For Pete's Sake (1974) — Pete Robbins
- The Reincarnation of Peter Proud (1975) — Peter Proud
- The Loves and Times of Scaramouche (1976) — Scaramouche
- The Gumball Rally (1976) — Michael Bannon — Cobra Team
- Caravans (1978) — Mark Miller
- Deadly Companion (1980) — Michael Taylor
- The Seduction (1982) — Brandon
- Fighting Back (1982) — Vince Morelli
- The Train Killer (1983) — Szilveszter Matuska
- Joshua Then and Now (1985) — Kevin Hornby
- Keeping Track (1986) — Daniel Hawkins
- Captive Hearts (1987) — Sergeant McManus
- Mascara (1987) — Bert Sanders
- Malarek (1988) — Moorcraft
- The Phone Call (1989) - Michael Henderson
- La Florida (1993) — Romeo Laflamme
- The Peacekeeper (1997) — Lt. Colonel Douglas Murphy
- Crackerjack 2 (1997) — Smith
- The Second Arrival (1998) — Prof. Nelson Zarcoff
- FeardotCom (2002) — Frank Bryant
- On the Road (2012) — Irish Catholic Priest

=== Television ===
Michael Sarrazin television credits
Year	Title	Role	Notes
1965	Festival	Various roles	3 episodes
1965	The Virginian	Sam Coates	1 episode
1966	Wojeck	Tony	1 episode
1966–67	Bob Hope Presents the Chrysler Theatre	Pvt. Tompkins / Davey Cooper	2 episodes
1985	Murder, She Wrote	David Marsh	Episode: "Joshua Peabody Died Here ... Possibly"
1989	The Ray Bradbury Theater	John Colt	Episode: "The Wind"
1991	Murder, She Wrote	Jacob Beiler	Episode: "Murder Plain and Simple"
1991	Counterstrike	Strand	Episode: "It's All in the Game"
1992	The Ray Bradbury Theater	Peter Horne	Episode: "Tomorrow's Child" (S6.E11)
1994	Kung Fu: The Legend Continues	Woody Clark	1 episode
1996	Star Trek: Deep Space Nine	Trevean	Episode: "The Quickening"
1996	The Outer Limits	Stranger	Episode: "I Hear You Calling"
1999	The Outer Limits	Marty Kilgore	Episode: "The Other Side"
1999–2000	The City	Milt	14 episodes
2000	La Femme Nikita	Dr. Lukas	1 episode
2001	Earth: Final Conflict	Dr. Charles Tenzer	1 episode
2002	Nero Wolfe	Thomas Yeager	Episode: "Too Many Clients"

==== TV films and miniseries ====
Michael Sarrazin television credits
Year	Title	Role	Notes
1966	The Doomsday Flight	Army Corporal	
1973	Frankenstein: The True Story	The Creature	
1980	Beulah Land	Casey Troy	
1989	Passion and Paradise	Mike Vincent	
1995	Bullet to Beijing	Craig	
1995	Midnight in Saint Petersburg	Craig	
1998	Earthquake in New York	Dr. Robert Trask	
2008	The Christmas Choir	Henry Brockman	

== Awards and nominations ==
Award	Year	Category	Work	Result	Ref.
British Academy Film Award	1971	Most Promising Newcomer to Leading Film Roles	They Shoot Horses, Don't They?	Nominated	
Laurel Award	1968	Male New Face	—N/a	4th Place	
Golden Globe	1969	New Star of the Year – Actor	The Sweet Ride	Nominated	
Gemini Award	1999	Best Performance by an Actor in a Featured Supporting Role in a Dramatic Series	The City ("Deranged Marriages")	Nominated	

== See also ==
- List of Canadian actors
- List of Quebec actors
