= Desert Crossing =

- Star Trek: Enterprise episode
- Episode no.: Season 1 Episode 24
- Directed by: David Straiton
- Story by: Rick Berman; Brannon Braga; André Bormanis
- Teleplay by: André Bormanis
- Production code: 124
- Original air date: May 8, 2002

Guest appearances
- Clancy Brown - Zobral; Charles Dennis - Chancellor Trelit; Brandon Karrer - Alien Man

Episode chronology
| ← Previous "Fallen Hero" | Next → "Two Days and Two Nights" |
- Star Trek: Enterprise season 1

"Desert Crossing" is the twenty-fourth episode (production #124) of the television series Star Trek: Enterprise. Set in the 22nd century of the Star Trek universe, Captain Archer commands the NX-01 Enterprise on a mission to explore the galaxy. The episode aired on UPN on May 8, 2002.

Captain Archer and Commander Tucker are invited to a desert planet by a man named Zobral only to discover that he is a "terrorist" with ulterior motives.

== Plot ==
Enterprise is on a course for Risa to take shore leave when they respond to a distress call from a ship experiencing engine problems. Its pilot, Zobral, invites Captain Archer and Commander Tucker to his home planet. Later, Enterprise is hailed from the planet by Chancellor Trellit of the Torothan government, who tells Sub-Commander T'Pol that Zobral and his men are terrorists, and that Archer and Tucker will probably never be seen again. T'Pol hails Archer to warn him, and he makes an excuse to leave. Zobral entreats them to stay, saying that after years of abuse by the oppressive Torothan government, and steadily failing attempts of resistance against it, his people are in dire need, and have been searching for outside help. He begs Archer's assistance and use of Enterprise's resources to defeat his people's oppressors. Archer tells Zobral that he doesn't know what he can do, Zobral thinks he is only being humble, and tells Archer he had recently been told by a Suliban transport captain of Archer's outstanding bravery, exceptional abilities, and recent liberation of "thousands" of Suliban prisoners from a detention camp, defeating an entire army in the process.

The Torothan government bombards the village. Archer and Tucker are led to a shelter, where they remain until the house above them is destroyed. They grab survival packs and leave on foot, heading east across the desert to a deserted building, where they take shelter from the heat and Archer tends to Tucker, who has heatstroke. Meanwhile, on Enterprise, Lieutenant Reed detects weapons fire on the surface, and Ensign Sato can't hail Archer as the region is being jammed. Trellit informs T'Pol that any shuttle pod entering the area will be considered an enemy vessel and fired upon. The Torothans also erect a dispersion field to prevent Enterprise from scanning the surface.

Zobral rendezvous with Enterprise and is met by T'Pol and Reed, who inform him that the account of Archer's liberation of the Suliban prisoners was true, but wildly exaggerated. Initially angered and disappointed, Zobral turns to leave, but is eventually persuaded to help T'Pol and Reed sneak a shuttle pod past the Torothan defenses in order to locate Archer and Tucker. While searching for bio-signs, T'Pol observes a bombardment of the ruined encampment from a distant battery, and orders that a new course be set, believing the Torothans have located them. After destroying the Torothan mortar, they land and collect the pair. Aboard Enterprise, Zobral prepares to leave, and Archer tells him that becoming involved in planetary conflicts is not the reason why Starfleet is exploring the galaxy. As they walk away, T'Pol tells Archer that he did the right thing, but Archer replies that he has a feeling that Zobral's cause is one worth fighting for.

== Production ==
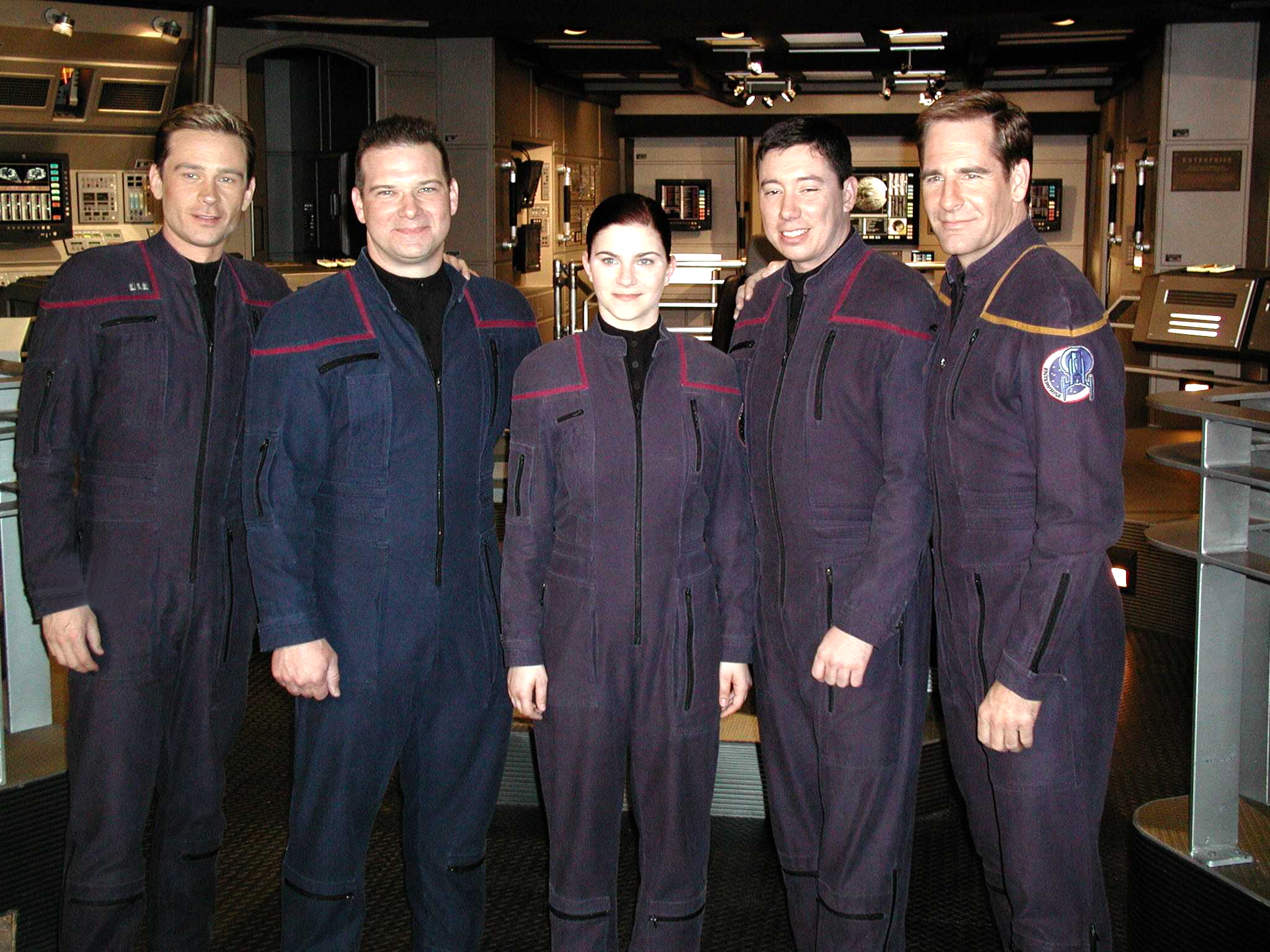
Sailors from the USS Enterprise appeared as NX-01 Enterprise crew.

This was the first episode of Enterprise directed by David Straiton; he went on to direct a total of ten episodes of the series. The story idea came from Rick Berman, Brannon Braga, and André Bormanis, and the script was written by Bormanis. Braga saw the episode as an example of the show exploring the implications of first contact in a more realistic light, and how they could accidentally cause conflict by making contact with one group rather than another. Berman said he was extremely happy with how the episode turned out, and said "Desert Crossing" was "undoubtedly one of the best episodes we've done". Bakula said he loved the episode as it was an opportunity to film on location and expand the vision of the show, and that the story asked a complicated question about what's right.

Filming took place on location in Southern California near Mexico. VFX Supervisor Ronald B. Moore of Eden FX was on location, he said the dunes were absolutely gorgeous and it was beautiful but on the second day filming had to be shut down due to a sandstorm. He had to drop his plans to go out on a dune buggy and shoot background footage and instead had to use photographs taken using his digital camera for reference. Much work was needed to remove background objects and footprints from the sand, and to explain the tire tracks they even added a three-wheeled vehicle and a person in CGI. In the episode Archer and Trip join in a local game called "Geskana", which has been described as "space lacrosse". The Geskana concept proved difficult to organize and film. VFX Producer Dan Curry had played lacrosse for many years and lent lacrosse sticks to Bakula and Trinneer for them to get a feel for it. One of the background artists played league lacrosse and was brought in to advise and serve as a background actor playing the game. The props were not suitably shaped for throwing the ball so the actors had to pantomime the action and a computer generated glowing ball was added in post production by Bruce Branit. Zobral's shuttle did not exist in real life and was entirely digital.

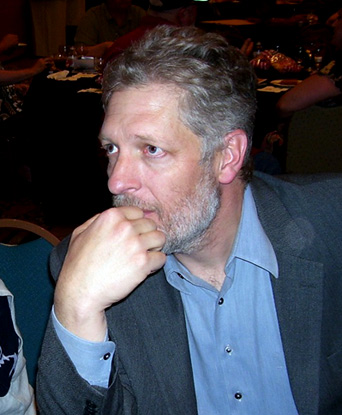
Guest star Clancy Brown

The episode guest starred Clancy Brown as Zobral, a charismatic alien leader. Charles Dennis previously appeared in the Star Trek: The Next Generation episode "Transfigurations".
Three outstanding crew members from the aircraft carrier USS Enterprise were cast as extras in the episode.

== Reception ==
"Desert Crossing" was first aired in the United States on UPN on May 8, 2002. It was the second part of a double bill, shown directly after "Fallen Hero". According to Nielsen Media Research, it received a 3/5 rating share among adults. This means it had an average of 4.68 million viewers.

Michelle Erica Green of TrekNation gave the episode a positive review, and said all the elements came together, "solid plot, good acting, great continuity, a break from the monotony of the ship and some of the Big Themes for which Star Trek has long been appreciated." Television Without Pity gave the episode a grade A−. In 2021, The Digital Fix said this was one of the better episodes in season one, noting it had an engaging story and saying it felt like classic Star Trek. Keith DeCandido Tor.com gave it 7 out of 10, in his 2022 rewatch. He especially liked the ambiguity of the Zobral's story, as well as the casting and performance of Clancy Brown.

The book Beyond the Final Frontier was positive about the episode "because unlike a lot of Star Trek, it doesn't judge Zobral – at the end of the episode, he may be a terrorist, he may not be."

== Home media ==
This episode was released as part of Enterprise season one, which was released in high definition on Blu-ray disc on March 26, 2013; the set has 1080p video and a DTS-HD Master Audio sound track.
