= To the Death (Star Trek: Deep Space Nine) =

- Star Trek: Deep Space Nine episode
- Episode no.: Season 4 Episode 23
- Directed by: LeVar Burton
- Written by: Ira Steven Behr; Robert Hewitt Wolfe
- Production code: 496
- Original air date: May 13, 1996

Guest appearances
- Brian Thompson as Toman'torax; Scott Haven as Virak'kara; Jeffrey Combs as Weyoun; Clarence Williams III as Omet'iklan

Episode chronology
← Previous "For the Cause"	Next → "The Quickening"
- Star Trek: Deep Space Nine season 4

"To the Death" is the 95th episode of the television series Star Trek: Deep Space Nine, the 23rd episode of the fourth season. "To the Death" achieved a Nielsen rating of 6 points when it originally premiered.

Set in the 24th century, the series follows the adventures of the crew of the Starfleet-managed space station Deep Space Nine, located adjacent to a wormhole that leads to the distant Gamma Quadrant. The Gamma Quadrant is controlled by an expansionist empire known as the Dominion, ruled by the shape-shifting Changelings, who have genetically engineered the relentless Jem'Hadar to be their soldiers. In this episode, the Deep Space Nine crew join a Jem'Hadar team to prevent renegade Jem'Hadar from using a gateway that could transport them anywhere in the galaxy.

This episode marks the debut of the recurring character Weyoun, played by Jeffrey Combs.

== Plot ==
After Deep Space Nine is attacked by a group of Jem'Hadar, Captain Sisko and his crew pursue them into the Gamma Quadrant aboard the Defiant. They find a disabled Jem'Hadar warship transmitting a distress signal and rescue the survivors: six Jem'Hadar soldiers and Weyoun, their Vorta handler.

Weyoun tells Sisko that the Jem'Hadar who attacked Deep Space Nine are renegades who have turned against the Dominion and are trying to restore an ancient Iconian Gateway—a sophisticated transporter that would give them the power to go anywhere in the galaxy instantaneously. Sisko agrees to join forces with Weyoun to destroy the Gateway before the renegade Jem'Hadar can use it. The Defiant crew forms an uneasy alliance with Weyoun and his Jem'Hadar, led by Omet'iklan. It soon becomes clear that Weyoun and Omet'iklan hold each other in contempt.

The Defiant crew try to learn to fight alongside the Jem'Hadar, who do not fear death or value their own lives. Their alliance is tested when Toman'torax, the Jem'Hadar second-in-command, picks a fight with Lieutenant Commander Worf. After breaking up the fight, Sisko and Omet'iklan discipline their men for brawling: Omet'iklan executes Toman'torax on the spot, while Sisko confines Worf to quarters. Omet'iklan is disgusted by what he perceives as lax discipline, and warns Sisko he will kill him when the mission is over. Meanwhile, Weyoun attempts to convince Odo, a renegade Changeling who opposes the Dominion, to rejoin the Dominion's Founders, whom the Vorta and Jem'Hadar alike revere as gods.

When they arrive on the planet where the Gateway is located, they find that the presence of the Gateway disables their phasers. They are attacked by a team of renegade Jem'Hadar. After a short but vicious battle, the group makes its way to the Gateway, engaging in sword and hand-to-hand combat all the way. In the fighting, Sisko saves Omet'iklan's life while risking his own; Omet'iklan does not understand why Sisko would save his life.

They destroy the Gateway with an explosive, which allows their weapons to function again. Omet'iklan kills Weyoun for questioning the Jem'Hadar's loyalty to the Founders. He compliments Sisko for the way they fought together, but reminds him that the next time they meet, they will be enemies again. Omet'iklan and his soldiers stay behind to hunt down the remaining Jem'Hadar for their disloyalty.

== Impact on series ==
Although the character of Weyoun is killed in this episode, the writers were impressed enough by Jeffrey Combs's performance in the role and the strong positive response from fans that they had the character return in the later episode "Ties of Blood and Water", establishing that the Vorta are clones who can be replaced when killed.

== Reception ==
In his 2014 rewatch Keith DeCandido rated it 8 out of 10. In 2015, Geek.com recommended this episode as "essential watching" for their abbreviated Star Trek: Deep Space Nine binge-watching guide.
