= Distant Origin =

- Star Trek: Voyager episode
- Episode no.: Season 3 Episode 23
- Directed by: David Livingston
- Written by: Brannon Braga; Joe Menosky
- Production code: 165
- Original air date: April 30, 1997

Guest appearances
- Henry Woronicz - Prof. Forra Gegen; Christopher Liam Moore - Tova Veer; Concetta Tomei - Minister Odala; Marshall R. Teague - Haluk; Nina Minton - Frola Gegen

Episode chronology
← Previous "Real Life"	Next → "Displaced"
- Star Trek: Voyager season 3

"Distant Origin" is the 65th episode of Star Trek: Voyager, the 23rd episode of the third season. The episode aired on UPN on April 30, 1997. Voyager encounters an alien race, but runs afoul of their principles. The Voth are humanoid lizards, and the plot revolves around one particular scientist who has taken an interest in studying Voth origins.

== Plot ==
On the planet where Voyager's crew had previously been marooned, Professor Gegen and his assistant Veer, two paleontologists of a space-faring saurian species known as the Voth, discover the skeletal remains of Voyager crewman Lt. Hogan. They are fascinated by the similarity of its genome to their own species, and Gegen suggests that this supports the highly controversial Distant Origin theory, that the Voth had originated on a far-distant planet instead of the current area of space from which they rule their empire. Proof of the theory has been sought by other Voth scientists, but the heretical theory has often led to their exile.

To confirm their proof, Gegen and Veer track down the origin of the skeleton, learning of Voyager's presence in the Delta Quadrant. They locate the ship and transport aboard while cloaked, observing the mostly human crew in the setting. Voyager's sensors detect their presence, and the crew reveals the two Voth. Veer responds instinctively by releasing a sedative-tipped needle that strikes Chakotay; Gegen grabs the human and transports him aboard his ship, fleeing from Voyager. The Doctor examines Veer and identifies the similar genetic structure; he and Captain Janeway use simulations to determine that the Voths descended from a species of dinosaur known as the hadrosaurs, of genus Parasaurolophus.

Gegen wakes Chakotay, and explains the situation, requesting Chakotay accompany him when he presents his evidence to the Voth elders; meanwhile, Voyager is captured by the Voth. Gegen speaks, "The truth is a matter of perspective. The further you get from the truth, the more vulnerable it becomes to propaganda and prejudice."

Gegen is put on trial for heresy, and it soon becomes clear that he has been pre-judged guilty and the "trial" is only an opportunity for him to recant and reduce his punishment. Veer, recovered from Voyager, is coerced to act as a witness against Gegen by Minister Odala. Chakotay attempts to argue for Gegen, noting that the Voth theory of origins has changed so much to fit what the Voth wish to believe and not reality. Odala rejects this, sentencing Gegen to a prison colony unless he recants. When he still refuses, she then orders Voyager destroyed and its entire crew, the evidence for his theory, also sent to the prison colony. Gegen, unwilling to see them destroyed, realizes he has no choice but to recant.

Odala assigns Gegen a new job, and orders Voyager to leave Voth space forever. Before departing, Chakotay gives Gegen a globe of the Earth, which Gegen acknowledges that the Voth will someday accept as their home world.

== Production ==
Writer Brannon Braga saw "Distant Origin" as being a metaphor for the relationship between Galileo Galilei and the Catholic Church. He described it as "the perfect episode" because it included not only that metaphor, but also a "what-if" science fiction premise and a unique structure as the episode follows the Voth as they investigate the humans.

The Voth returned in Star Trek Online as part of the "Season Eight" expansion. The development team had previously hoped to introduce the species, but that idea was scrapped. As part of their redesign, they were changed from purely scientists as seen in the episode to scientifically advanced soldiers. A variety of variants on the Voth were created that had not been seen in "Distant Origin", such as those in powered armour as well as raptors – an enemy type far more similar to typical dinosaurs.

== Special effects ==
This episode featured the Voth City Ship, which was noted in 2015 as one of the largest fictional spacecraft featured in on-screen science fiction television and movies up to that time. At over 9 km (6 miles) in length the Voth ship is quite large for Star Trek, and a little bigger than the Varro generation ship which appears in the later episode "The Disease". The largest on-screen spacecraft at that time was rated as the alien mothership in the film Independence Day (1996), and the biggest Star Trek was V'Ger featured in the Star Trek: The Motion Picture (1979).

== Reception ==
Michael Piller, who had left the production team on Voyager at the beginning of the third season to work on Star Trek: Insurrection, described "Distant Origin" as the best episode of the series so far. TrekNews.net ranked this the 4th best episode of Star Trek: Voyager, in 2016.

When Dreamwatch magazine reviewed the episode for the VHS release, it rated it as seven out of ten, calling it a "welcome breath of fresh air" but felt that the alien characters were initially played more for comedy value than they should have been. It added that, since the entertainment industry was involved in the McCarthyism of the 1950s, "anything suggesting that intellectual freedom should be cherished is a good thing."

In terms of science fiction world building, the Voth City Ship was noted for its size and power over Voyager in this episode.

In 2020, io9 listed this episode as one of the "must watch" episodes from season 3.

== Media releases ==
This episode was released on DVD on July 6, 2004 as part of Star Trek Voyager: Complete Third Season, with Dolby 5.1 surround audio. The season 3 DVD was released in the UK on September 6, 2004.

In 2017, the complete Star Trek: Voyager television series was released in a DVD box set, which included it as part of the season 3 discs.
