= Displaced (Star Trek: Voyager) =

- Star Trek: Voyager episode
- Episode no.: Season 3 Episode 24
- Directed by: Allan Kroeker
- Written by: Lisa Klink
- Production code: 166
- Original air date: May 7, 1997

Guest appearances
- Kenneth Tigar - Dammar; James Noah - Rislan; Mark L. Taylor - Jarlath; Nancy Youngblut - Taleen; Zach LeBeau - Ens. Larson; Deborah Levin - Ens. Lang

Episode chronology
← Previous "Distant Origin"	Next → "Worst Case Scenario"
- Star Trek: Voyager season 3

"Displaced" is the 66th episode of Star Trek: Voyager, the 24th episode of the third season. The episode aired on UPN on May 7, 1997. In this episode an alien, a Nyrian who goes by Dammar appears on the USS Voyager. In this episode, the crew of the USS Voyager contend with crew members disappearing as Nyrian aliens appear to replace them.

== Plot ==
While Voyager is traveling through space, a Nyrian stranger, Dammar, appears on board without any apparent warning. At the same time, Kes disappears from the ship. Dammar says he has no idea of what has happened. Soon, other crew members are similarly displaced by Nyrians, who say that Voyager's people are appearing on their planet. The exchanges are happening at regular intervals, but B'Elanna Torres is unable to tell whether this is a natural phenomenon or some transporter-like technology.

Captain Janeway provides the Nyrians the warmer temperature and dim lighting they request for their sensitive physiology, but is suspicious enough to order them confined to cargo bays and the ship's systems locked down. Over the following hours, the displacements continue until only a handful of Voyager's crew remain aboard.

The Nyrians, led by Dammar, suddenly try to seize control of the ship. Voyager's remaining crew do their best to disable ship's systems, but can do nothing to prevent their own displacement; Chakotay, as the last crew member aboard, is able to grab the Doctor's mobile emitter before he too is displaced off the ship.

With the entire crew displaced, the Nyrians reveal the truth. The Voyager captives are now in a simulated environment designed especially for their long-term comfort by the Nyrians. The Nyrians find this gradual method of capturing ships, space stations, and colonies more civilized than war, and have no wish to harm their captives, but of course cannot allow them to escape.

When they leave, Jarlath, an alien from the neighboring environment, appears. After nine years' captivity he discovered how to move between the different environments, and while he finds his people's captivity comfortable enough, he is interested in trading. In return for new kinds of food from the human environment, he explains how he found the concealed "portal".

Torres modifies the Doctor's emitter to allow him to see these openings. Tuvok improvises two phasers. He, Janeway, Torres, and Tom Paris exit from the habitat and find themselves in a corridor leading to several environments. They split into two parties. Janeway and Tuvok find a control station, where they learn that they are aboard a large ship containing dozens of different habitats. Nyrian guards attack both groups; Paris and Torres escape by entering a cold environment that the Nyrians cannot tolerate. But neither can Klingons, so Torres is in danger.

Janeway and Tuvok, however, are able to defeat the guards and override the security controls on the Nyrian displacement technology. They use it to rescue Paris and Torres from the cold. Then they transport Dammar and his second-in-command to the cold environment and threaten to abandon him and his entire crew there. Dammar quickly surrenders. Voyager's crew return to their ship and arrange for the other displaced people to be returned to their respective homes.

== Production ==
Guest stars on this episode include Kenneth Tigar, Mark L. Taylor, James Noah, and Nancy Youngblut. Deborah Leven and Majel Barret co-star. The episode was written by Lisa Klink and directed by Allan Kroeker.

One of the plot elements in this episode is an extremely long range transporter.

== Reception ==
In 2020, io9 listed this episode as one of the "must watch" episodes from season three of the show.

== Home media release ==
"Displaced" was released on DVD on July 6, 2004 as part of Star Trek Voyager: Complete Third Season, with Dolby 5.1 surround audio.

In 2017, the complete Star Trek: Voyager television series was released in a DVD box set, which included "Displaced" as part of the season 3 discs.
