= Grayscale (disambiguation) =

Grayscale is a type of monochromatic imagery.

Grayscale or Greyscale may also refer to:

- Grayscale (band), an American pop punk band
- Grayscale Investments
- Grayscale, a modular synthesizer brand
- Greyscale (film), a feature film by Ryan Dunlap
- Greyscale, a fictional skin disease, usually contagious, that afflicts multiple individual characters and the Stonemen in A Song of Ice and Fire and Game of Thrones
- In the Grayscale, a Chilean drama film
- Greyscale (album), a 2015 album by Camouflage

== See also ==
- Shades of gray
