= The Fourth Horseman (Millennium) =

- Millennium episode
- Episode no.: Season 2 Episode 22
- Directed by: Dwight Little
- Written by: Glen Morgan; James Wong
- Original air date: May 8, 1998

Guest appearances
- Glenn Morshower as Richard Gilbert; Bill Dow as Dr. Schroeder; Kristen Cloke as Lara Means

Episode chronology
← Previous "Somehow, Satan Got Behind Me"	Next → "The Time Is Now"
- Millennium season 2

"The Fourth Horseman" is the twenty-second episode of the second season of the American crime-thriller television series Millennium. It premiered on the Fox network on May 8, 1998. The episode was written by Glen Morgan and James Wong, and directed by Dwight Little. "The Fourth Horseman" featured guest appearances by Kristen Cloke and Glenn Morshower.

In this episode, offender profiler Frank Black (Lance Henriksen) investigates the initial outbreak of a deadly virus, and discovers that his employers, the Millennium Group may pose a danger to his safety.

"The Fourth Horseman" was written under the belief that the series would soon be cancelled, and inspired in part by the outbreak of bovine spongiform encephalopathy in the United Kingdom. The episode has earned positive responses from critics, and was seen by approximately 4.61 million households during its initial broadcast.

== Plot ==
In 1986, a farmer in Waterloo, Wisconsin, finds his entire warehouse of chickens dead, the floor soaked in blood. He attempts to call for help, but quickly collapses, bleeding profusely and covered in dark lesions.

Twelve years later, Millennium Group consultant Frank Black (Lance Henriksen) is visited by a retired FBI agent, Richard Gilbert (Glenn Morshower). Gilbert hopes to headhunt Black, a former colleague, for his new private security firm, The Trust. Their meeting abruptly ends when Black receives word that his father has died. At the funeral, Black explains the notion of death to his daughter Jordan (Brittany Tiplady); later that day, he unsuccessfully tries to contact fellow Group member Lara Means (Kristen Cloke), with whom he has lost contact.

Black meets with another Group member, Peter Watts (Terry O'Quinn), to investigate the death of Jason Mogilny, who was found at a riverbank surrounded by six pints of spilt blood, with no evidence of murder. Black notices dead birds floating past in the river. A coroner determines that Mogilny drowned when his lungs filled with his own blood, surmising the cause to be a viral infection. Everyone who came into contact with the body is isolated in quarantine, waiting to be tested for exposure to any pathogen.

While quarantined, Black accuses Watts and the Millennium Group of knowing more about the virus than is apparent; Watts frantically quotes the Bible's Book of Revelation in response. The pair are examined by mysterious doctors in protective suits. Shortly afterwards, they are cleared to leave quarantine. Black contacts Gilbert and accepts his offer to join The Trust; however, he first wishes to "rescue" his friends within the Group and asks for Gilbert's help in locating Means.

In El Cajon, California, a family sit down to dinner for Mother's Day before spontaneously collapsing and bleeding profusely. At home, Black's wife Catherine (Megan Gallagher) tells him that Jordan has been having vivid nightmares about the apocalypse, in which she and her parents are isolated in a woodland cabin. Black admits to Catherine that he has come to accept the Group as a cult and wishes to leave. He arranges to see a doctor, asking that his results remain secret.

Gilbert, finding that Watts has been in contact with Means, puts him under surveillance. Black travels to Means' last known location, where he observes a cult-like ceremony in which she is ritually inducted into the Group. Contacting Watts, he reveals the results of his tests — they were injected with a vaccine while quarantined. Black insists that the Group is dangerous and they should flee; Watts refuses, predicting that an earthquake will occur the following morning and urging Black to accept full membership in the Group when this comes to pass.

The next morning, Black receives a call from Means, who tells him that the Group mean no harm. The line suddenly cuts, and the tremors of an earthquake begin just as Watts had predicted. Black braces himself in a doorway, noticing that his pet bird is dead in its cage, covered in blood.

== Production ==
"The Fourth Horseman" was written by frequent collaborators Glen Morgan and James Wong. The duo would pen a total of fifteen episodes throughout the series' run. The pair had also taken the roles of co-executive producers for the season. The episode was the second of three to be directed by Dwight Little, who had previously helmed "Midnight of the Century", and would return in the third season for "Borrowed Time".

Written simultaneously with the concluding episode, "The Time Is Now", the episode's script went through several different versions before a final plot was decided upon, as Morgan and Wong believed the series would not be renewed for a third season and wished to write a suitable ending. The idea of depicting an apocalyptic scenario as being the result of a virus came from Morgan's research into possible end-of-the-world scenarios, and was influenced by the outbreak of bovine spongiform encephalopathy in the United Kingdom. The build-up to, and depiction of, the viral outbreak was seen by the writing staff as conclusive proof that the series would be cancelled, leading to several writers beginning to look for work on other projects while still officially under contract to work on Millennium.

Actress Brittany Tiplady, who portrays Black's young daughter Jordan, has cited "The Fourth Horseman" as one of the episodes which she considered to have caused her to grow as an actress. Tiplady described her role in the episode as not being "just the cute Jordan Black with easy scenes and lots of giggling", and added that the increased depth her character was given served to heighten her interest in acting.

== Broadcast and reception ==
"The Fourth Horseman" was first broadcast on the Fox network on May 8, 1998. The episode earned a Nielsen rating of 4.7 during its original broadcast, meaning that 4.7 percent of households in the United States viewed the episode. This represented approximately 4.61 million households, and left the episode the eighty-fifth most-viewed broadcast that week. (Note: Each ratings point represented 980,000 households during the 1997–98 television season.)

"The Time Is Now" received positive reviews from critics. The A.V. Club's Emily VanDerWerff rated the episode an "A". VanDerWerff felt that the two-part finale was "at once haunting and terrifying", finding both "The Fourth Horseman" and "The Time Is Now" to be Millennium's most frightening instalments. VanDerWerff noted that the episode's plotting and symbolism were not always subtle, but felt that this directness suited the series' tone. Bill Gibron, writing for DVD Talk, rated the episode 5 out of 5. Gibron felt that both Cloke and O'Quinn gave particularly strong performances in both this episode and its follow-up. Robert Shearman and Lars Pearson, in their book Wanting to Believe: A Critical Guide to The X-Files, Millennium & The Lone Gunmen, rated "The Fourth Horseman" five stars out of five.

== Footnotes ==
=== References ===
- Shearman, Robert; Pearson, Lars (2009). Wanting to Believe: A Critical Guide to The X-Files, Millennium & The Lone Gunmen. Mad Norwegian Press. ISBN 978-0-9759446-9-1.
- McLean, James; Henriksen, Lance; Spotnitz, Frank; Carter, Chris (2012). Chamberlain, Adam; Dixon, Brian A. (eds.). Back to Frank Black. Fourth Horseman Press. ISBN 978-0-9883922-9-8.
