= Tim Russ =

American actor (born 1956)

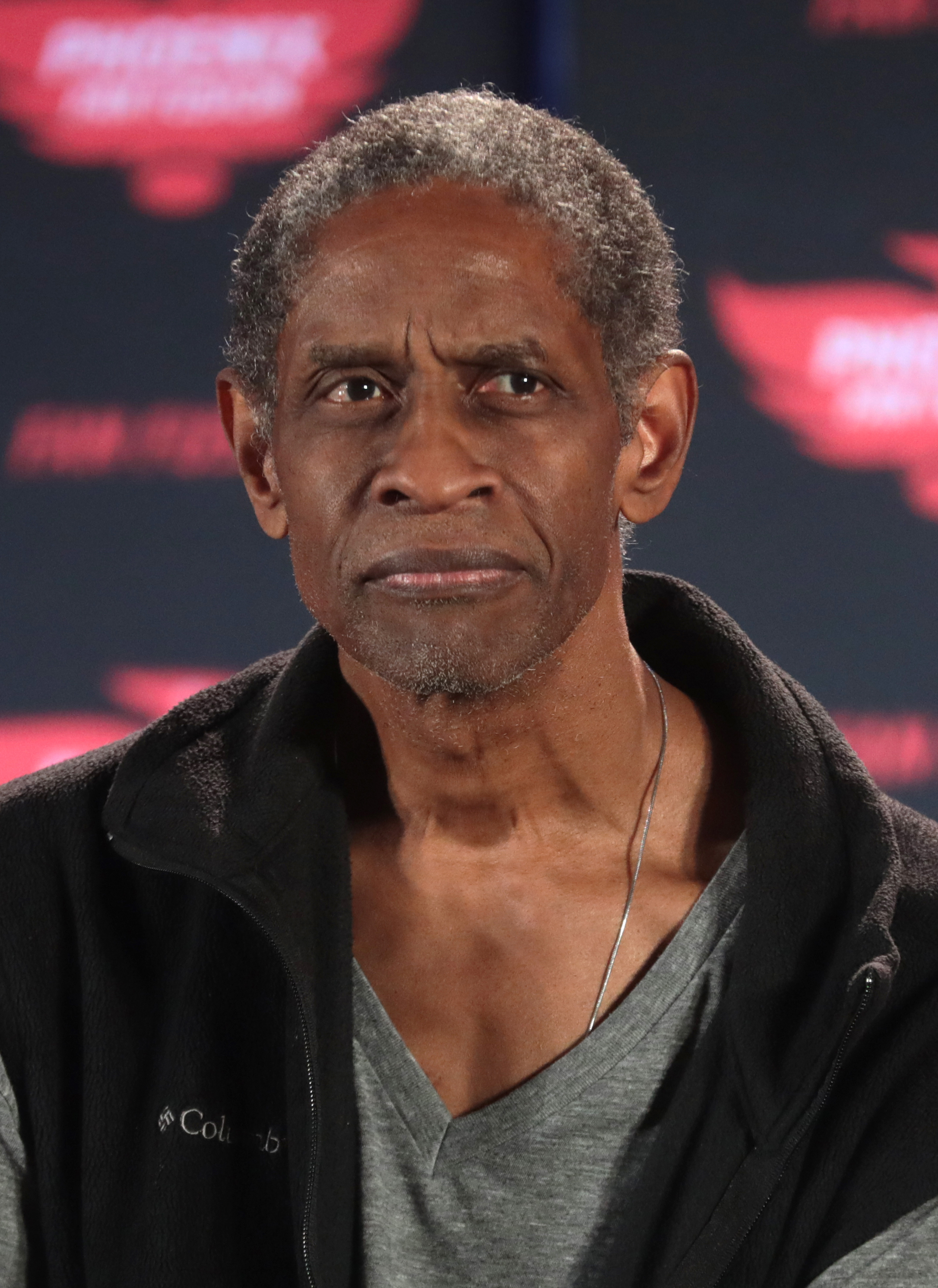
- Russ at the 2022 Phoenix Fan Fusion
- Born: Timothy Darrell Russ; June 22, 1956 (age 70); Washington, D.C., U.S.
- Education: St. Edward's University (BA); Illinois State University (attended)
- Occupations: Actor; musician; screenwriter; producer; director
- Years active: 1985–present
- Children: 1

Timothy Darrell Russ (born June 22, 1956) is an American actor, musician, screenwriter, director and amateur astronomer. His roles include Lieutenant Commander Tuvok on Star Trek: Voyager; Robert Johnson in Crossroads (1986); Casey in East of Hope Street (1998); Frank on Samantha Who?; Principal Franklin on the Nickelodeon sitcom iCarly; D. C. Montana on The Highwaymen (1987–1988). He also had a brief role in Spaceballs (1987). He appeared in The Rookie: Feds (2022) and reprised his role as Captain Tuvok on Season 3 of Star Trek: Picard.

== Early life, family and education ==
Russ was born in Washington, D.C., on June 22, 1956, to a government employee mother and a U.S. Air Force officer father. He spent part of his childhood in Turkey. He attended his senior year of high school at Rome Free Academy, from which he graduated in 1974. He graduated from St. Edward's University with a degree in theater arts. He additionally attended graduate school at Illinois State University where he was inducted into its Hall of Fame. With a girlfriend, Jedda Roskilly, he has a daughter.

== Career ==
=== Acting ===
In 1985, Russ appeared in The Twilight Zone episodes "Kentucky Rye" as Officer No. 2 and "Voices in the Earth" as Archer. One of his best-remembered roles is in the comedy film Spaceballs as a trooper who "combs" the desert with a giant hair pick. Russ had a prominent role in the Charles Bronson film Death Wish 4.

Russ has been involved in the Star Trek franchise as a voice and film actor, writer, director, and producer. He played several minor roles before landing the role as the main character Tuvok in Star Trek: Voyager. Russ screentested, in 1987, for the role of Geordi La Forge on Star Trek: The Next Generation before being cast as Tuvok. Russ went into Voyager as a dedicated Trekkie with an extensive knowledge of Vulcan lore, and has played the following roles in the Star Trek universe:

- Devor, a mercenary aboard the Enterprise-D disguised as a service engineer in The Next Generation episode "Starship Mine" (1993)
- T'Kar, a Klingon in the Deep Space Nine episode "Invasive Procedures" (1993)
- A human tactical Lieutenant on the USS Enterprise-B in the film Star Trek Generations (1994).
- Tuvok's Mirror Universe counterpart in the Deep Space Nine episode "Through the Looking Glass" (1995).
- A changeling impersonating Tuvok in Star Trek: Picard season 3.

In 1995, Russ co-wrote the story for the Malibu Comics Star Trek: Deep Space Nine No. 29 and 30, with Mark Paniccia. Russ performed voice acting roles as Tuvok for the video games Star Trek: Voyager – Elite Force and Star Trek: Elite Force II. Russ is the director and one of the stars of the fan series Star Trek: Of Gods and Men, the first third of which was released in December 2007, with the remaining two-thirds released in 2008.

Russ's character's name D. C. Montana in The Highwayman was a reference to Trek writer D. C. Fontana.

In 1990, he appeared in an episode of Freddy's Nightmares.

Russ directed and co-starred in Star Trek: Renegades, and in both 2013 and 2014 reprised his role as the voice of Tuvok in the massively multiplayer online game Star Trek Online.

=== Later work ===
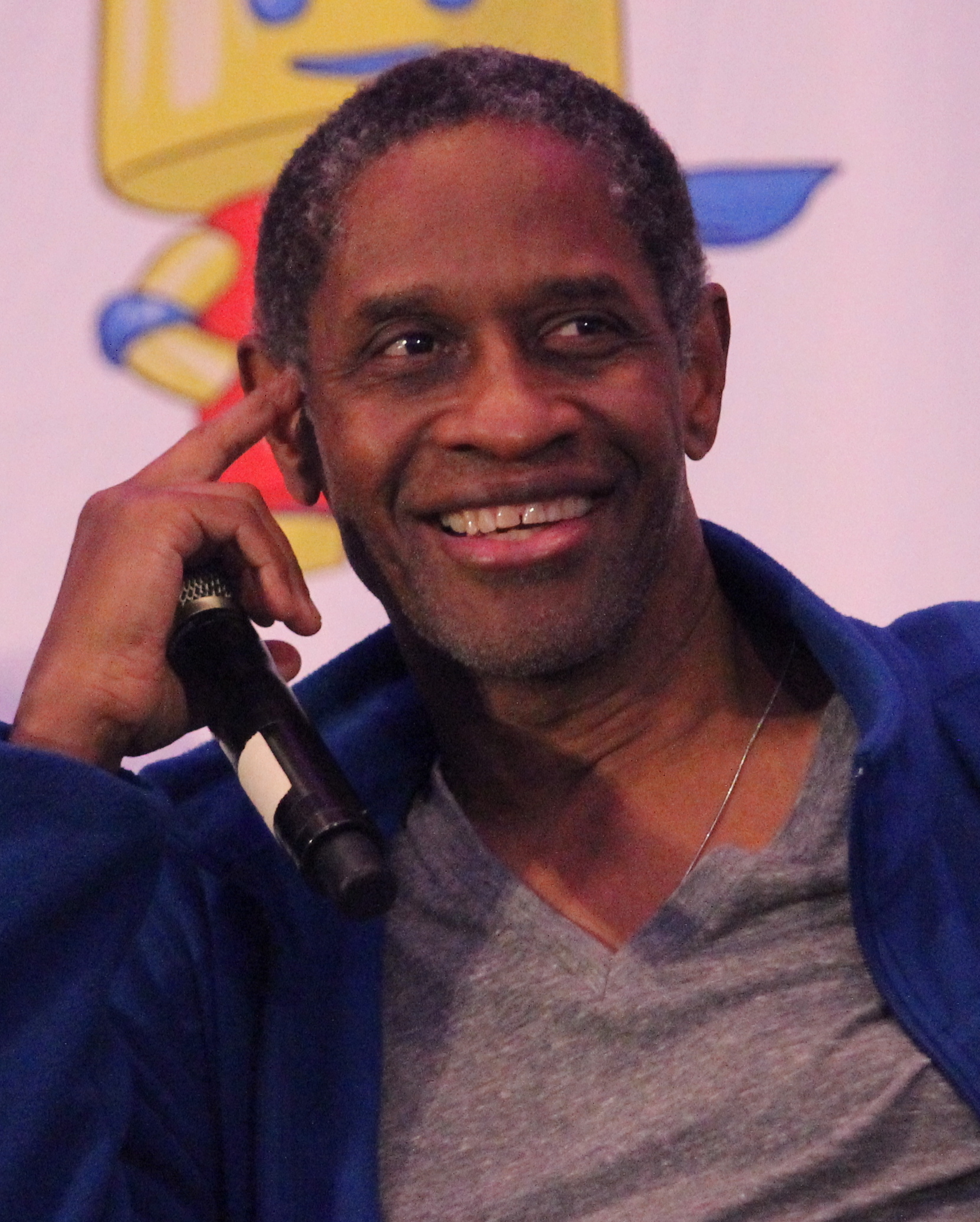
Russ at the Paradise City Comic Con, December 2016

Russ appeared as Frank, a sarcastic doorman in the sitcom Samantha Who? from 2007 to 2009, and appeared for six seasons as Principal Ted Franklin in Nickelodeon's show iCarly. He also portrayed a doctor on an episode of Hannah Montana, "I Am Hannah, Hear Me Croak".

Russ won an Emmy Award in 2014 for public service ads he did for the FBI's Los Angeles Field Office on intellectual property theft and cyberbullying.

He played Captain Kells in the 2015 Bethesda Game Studios video game Fallout 4.

In June 2025, following Mel Brooks' announcement of Spaceballs 2, slated for release in 2027, Russ teased on social media that he may appear in the film, along with his more famous co-stars.

=== Music and astronomy ===
Russ has been a lifelong musician and a singer. In addition, Russ has been an avid amateur astronomer most of his adult life, and is a member of the Los Angeles Astronomical Society. In 2021 he was among a small group of citizen astronomers who assisted in detection of the asteroid 617 Patroclus in preparation for NASA's Lucy probe. In February 2022, he stated that he owned a 10-inch Dobsonian telescope, an 8" Schmidt-Cassegrain telescope, and a Unistellar eVscope.

== Filmography ==
=== Film ===
Tim Russ film credits
Year	Title	Role	Notes
1986	Crossroads	Robert Johnson	
1986	Fire with Fire	Jerry Washington	
1987	Spaceballs	Desert-Combing Trooper	
1987	Death Wish 4: The Crackdown	Jesse	
1988	Bird	Harris	
1988	Pulse	Policeman	
1991	Eve of Destruction	Carter	
1991	Night Eyes 2	Jesse Younger	
1992	Mr. Saturday Night	Assistant director	
1994	Dead Connection	Detective Chuck Roland	
1994	Star Trek Generations	Enterprise-B Bridge Officer	
1997	East of Hope Street	Casey	
2003	Roddenberry on Patrol	Red-Shirt Bandit	Also director and producer
2004	The Borg	Tuvok	Short, archive footage
2004	Geeks	Self	Documentary
2005	The Cabinet of Dr. Caligari	Town Clerk	
2006	The Oh in Ohio	Douglas	
2006	Unbeatable Harold	Diner Manager	
2006	Borg War	Tuvok (voice)	Animated fan film
2007	Live Free or Die Hard	Chuck Summer	Die Hard 4.0 (outside North America)
2007	InAlienable	News Anchor	
2008	Star Trek: Of Gods and Men	Tuvok	Fan film, also director and writer
2008	Star Trek: The Tour	Tuvok	Short
2009	Chad and the Alien Toupee	Murray Silverman	Short
2010	Reformed Tramp	The Narrator	Short
2010	Hometown Glory	Narrator (voice)	Documentary
2011	Rampart	Command staff Member No. 1	
2012	C.A.T.s (Covert Anti-Espionage Team)	Harry	Short
2012	John Derek: Film Genius	Narrator	Short faux-documentary
2014	Alongside Night	General Jack Guerdon	
2014	Asteroid vs. Earth	Captain Rogers	
2014	Greyscale	Gavin Calhoun	
2014	Cavity	Star Trac Agent No. 1	Short
2015	Star Trek: Renegades	Tuvok	Also director
2015	Greyscale	Gavin Calhoun	
2016	Six Gun Savior	Ezekiel Roak	
2017	Her Side of the Bed	Charles Harwell	
2017	5th Passenger	Franklin	
2018	A Fairy's Game	Warlock	Voice
2018	Junkie	Martin Green	
2018	Karma	Frank Hudson	
2018	Dick Dickster	Sammy Davas Jr.	Also executive producer
2018	The Killer's Requiem	Detective Hank Starnes	
2018	Well, Maybe There Are Some Small Parts	Tim Russ	Also director, short film
2019	Vitals	The Surgeon	
2019	Tenet Noctis	Iman	Also director
2019	Ghost in the Gun	Ghost in the Gun	Short film
2020	The Midnight Sky	Mason Mosley	
2020	Unbelievable!!!!!	Dr. Robert Schmitt	
2021	The Emissaries Movie	Narrator	
2021	Vampire Slayer	News Reporter (voice)	
2022	Nightshade	Captain Burns	
2023	Batman: The Doom That Came to Gotham	Lucius Fox	Voice
2024	The Star City Murders	Captain Royce Aikman	
2024	Surge of Power: Where There's Smoke	Mortrigard	
2024	Rhythm (Make Moves Towards What You Love)	Announcer	
2024	FOAM (Freedom of Adventure in Motion)	Shop Owner	Animated
2024	To the Journey: Looking Back at Star Trek: Voyager	Self	Documentary
2025	One Big Happy Family		
2025	Left in Space	Ominous Voice	Short film
2025	Emissaries: Into the Ionosphere 2	Narrator	
2025	Renegades: The Making of Star Trek: Gods and Men	Self	Documentary

=== Television ===
Tim Russ television credits
Year	Title	Role	Notes
1985	Hunter	Sam	Episode: "Killer in a Halloween Mask"
1985, 1987	Hill Street Blues	Paramedic / Burton / Ben Childers	4 episodes
1985	The Twilight Zone	Officer No. 2	Episode: "Kentucky Rye"
1986	Samaritan: The Mike Snyder Story		TV film
1986	The Magical World of Disney	Dixon	Episode: "Casebusters"
1986	Amazing Stories	Security Guard No. 1	Episode: "You Gotta Believe Me"
1986	Heart of the City	Collins	Episode: "When Push Comes to Shove"
1987	Jake and the Fatman	Pete	Episode: "Brother, Can You Spare a Dime?"
1987	Starman	Tyrone Washington	Episode: "The System"
1987	Timestalkers	Sergeant Filton	TV film
1987	The Twilight Zone	Archer	Episode: "Voices in the Earth"
1987	Vietnam War Story	Sgt. Lemon	Episode: "The Mine"
1987	Thirtysomething	Salesman	Episode: "Pilot"
1987	Throb	Man No. 2	Episode: "Whose Coup Is It Anyway?"
1987–1988	The Highwayman	D.C. Montana	10 episodes
1988	Who Gets the Friends?	Roger Hamel	TV film
1988	21 Jump Street	Ray Davies	Episode: "Slippin' Into Darkness"
1988	Roots: The Gift	Marcellus the slave doorman	TV film
1988	Police Story: Cop Killer		TV film
1988	Miracle at Beekman's Place		TV film
1989	Alien Nation	Ronald Ketnes	TV film
1989	Beauty and the Beast	Lieutenant Eric Parker	Episode: "Sticks and Stones"
1989	The People Next Door	Answering Machine Guy	3 episodes
1990	Cop Rock	Juror	2 episodes
1990	Family Matters	Jeff	Episode: "Sitting Pretty"
1990	Freddy's Nightmares	Dr. Henry Picard	Episode: "Dust to Dust"
1990	Mancuso, FBI	Malcolm Rashad	Episode: "Conspiracy"
1990	The Bakery	Billy Franklin	TV film
1990	Generations	Brian Price	9 episodes
1990, 1992	The Fresh Prince of Bel-Air	Eugene / Agent Collins	3 episodes
1991	Lifestories	K.C.	Episode: "Darryl Tevis"
1991	Dead Silence	Deputy Ryan	TV film
1991	The Heroes of Desert Storm		TV film
1992	Tequila and Bonetti	Link	Episode: "The Rose Cadillac"
1992	The Young and the Restless	Wendell Baird	Episode: "Episode #1.4834"
1992	The Please Watch the Jon Lovitz Special	Self	
1993	Hangin' with Mr. Cooper	Victor	Episode: "Seoul Shake"
1993	Living Single	Officer Taylor	Episode: "Burglar in the House"
1993	Murphy Brown	Agent No. 1	Episode: "The Egg & I"
1993	Star Trek: The Next Generation	Devor	Episode: "Starship Mine"
1993	Journey to the Center of the Earth	Joe Briggs	TV film
1993	Dark Justice		Episode: "Night Games"
1993	SeaQuest 2032	Martin Clemens	Episode: "Photon Bullet"
1993-1994	Hangin' with Mr. Cooper	Victor	2 episodes
1993, 1995	Star Trek: Deep Space Nine	T'Kar /Mirror Universe Tuvok	2 episodes
1994	Melrose Place	Roger Chambers	Episode: "It's a Bad World After All"
1994	SeaQuest DSV	Martin 'Mycroft' Clemens	Episode: "Photon Bullet"
1994	Bitter Vengeance	Lieutenant James	TV film
1994	Monty	Man No. 1	Episode: "Pilot"
1995	Inside the New Adventure: Star Trek - Voyager	Self	TV film
1995	Launch of Star Trek: Voyager	Self	Documentary
1995–2001	Star Trek: Voyager	Lieutenant Tuvok/Tulak	172 episodes
1996	It's Hot in Here: UPN Fall Preview	Self	TV special
1997	Spider-Man: The Animated Series	Hobie Brown / Prowler (voice)	Episode: "The Prowler"
1997	Trekkies	Self	Documentary
1998	The 24th Annual Saturn Awards	Self	
1999	Ultimate Trek: Star Trek's Greatest Moments	Tuvok	Archive footage
2002	Any Day Now	Juror	Episode: "The Real Thing"
2002	OB-1	Self	TV film
2005	ER	Dr. Medford	Episode: "Alone in a Crowd"
2005	How William Shatner Changed the World	Self/Tuvok	Archive footage
2005-2006	Unfabulous	Officer Jones	2 episodes
2006	NCIS	Jerry Kemper	Episode: "Jeopardy"
2006	Twenty Good Years	Marty	3 episodes
2006	Space Top 10 Countdown	Self	Episode: "Movie Aliens"
2006-2007	General Hospital	Dr. Trent	4 episodes
2007	Hannah Montana	Dr. Meyer	Episode: "I Am Hannah, Hear Me Croak"
2007	Without a Trace	Phil Hansen	Episode: "Tail Spin"
2007–2012	iCarly	Principal Ted Franklin	9 episodes
2007–2009	Samantha Who?	Frank the Doorman	35 episodes
2008	Divas of Novella	Ship computer (voice)	TV film, also writer and co-producer
2008	Filmnut	Self	Episode: "An Interview with Tim Russ"
2009	Lincoln Heights	Principal	Episode: "Lucky"
2009	Trust Me	Gordon Benedict	2 episodes
2010	Starship Farragut: The Animated Episodes	Tumar (voice)	Fan miniseries, episode: "The Needs of the Many"
2010	CSI: Miami	Leonard Sterling	Episode: "Meltdown"
2010	The Secret Life of the American Teenager	Vicar	Episode: "Ben There, Done That"
2010	The Whole Truth		Episode: "Young Love"
2010	Biography	Self	Episode: "The Captains of the Final Frontier"
2010–2011	Sym-Bionic Titan	Solomon/Various voices	9 episodes
2011	Good Luck Charlie	Dr. Meyer	Episode: "L.A.R.P. in the Park"
2011	Suits	Robert Geller	Episode: "Identity Crisis"
2011	The Young and the Restless	Judge Morrison	2 episodes
2011	Star Trek Phase II	Erlichmann Plumbers	Unaired, episode: "The Vignettes: 1701 Pennsylvania Av."
2011	The Making of Spotlight	The Narrator	Short
2011-2025	Bloomers	Mr. Adler	3 episodes, also director
2011-2012	Aspiring Hollywood	Self - guest	2 episodes
2012	The Soul Man	Devon	Episode: "How to Be a Church Lady"
2012	Shmagreggie Saves the World	Tom from the Future	TV film
2012	Actors Entertainment	Self	Episode: "ActorsE Chat with Tim Russ and Christie Philips"
2013	Castle	Dr. Malcolm Wickfield	Episode: "Time Will Tell"
2013	Gibby	Principal Ted Franklin	Unaired Pilot
2013	Guys with Kids	Specialist	Episode: "Rare Breed"
2013	Lab Rats	Special Agent Gordon	Episode: "Parallel Universe"
2013	Arrested Development	Baby Having Babies Crew	Episode: "Señoritis", uncredited
2013	Social Nightmare	Principal Ajeti	TV film
2013	Welcome to Comic Con!	Self (archive footage)	TV special, segment: "Salute to Star Trek"
2013	Castle	Dr. Malcom Wickfield	Episode: "Time Will Tell"
2014	Regular Show	Sergeant, Helicopter Pilot (voice)	Episode: "Portable Toilet"
2014	Asteroid vs Earth	Captain Rogers	TV film
2014	FanGirl Academy: 101	Self	Episode: "Movie Magic 101"
2014	We Love Soaps TV	Self - guest	Episode: "S5.E31"
2014	The 40th Annual Emmy Awards	Attendee, award recipient	
2014	The Emergent Lens	Host/guest	12 episodes
2014-2016	From The Mouths of Babes	Self	5 episodes
2015	The Night Shift	Mr. Clark	Episode: "Recovery"
2015	Sharknado 3: Oh Hell No!	General Gottlieb	TV film
2015	UCB Comedy Originals	Self	Episode: "Star Trek's Tim Russ Explains Star Wars Day"
2015	Sacramento Film Works	Self	Episode: "The Making of Rellik"
2015	Trekyards	Self	Episode: "Tim Russ Voyager Interview"
2015	Talking Voices	Self	Episode: "Talking Voices"
2016	Gortimer Gibbon's Life on Normal Street	Winston Hobbes	Episode: "Gortimer vs. the World's Best Mom"
2016	50 Years of Star Trek	Self	TV documentary
2017	The Good Doctor	Patient Chuck	Episode: "Oliver"
2017	The Fosters	Judge James Eskin	2 episodes
2017	Renegades	Commander Kovok	2 episodes
2017	Mystic Cosmic Patrol	Gorgon	Episode: "Potty Mouth: Part 1"
2017	Sun, Sand & Romance	Gus Van Houtten	TV film
2017	Criminal Minds	Agent Lawrence	Episode: "To A Better Place"
2017	The Good Doctor	Chuck	Episode: "Oliver"
2017	Blade of Honor	Yuni	5 episodes
2018	9-1-1	Marriage Counsellor	Episode: "Let Go"
2018	NCIS: New Orleans	Felix Hill	Episode: "Ties That Bind"
2018	Personal Space	Jeff Lipschitz	2 episodes
2018	Superior Donuts	Professor Mills	2 episodes
2018	Supergirl	Councilman Jul-Us	Episode: "Dark Side of The Moon"
2018	Karma	Frank Hudson	TV film
2018	Monastery Katz of the 5 Corners		TV film
2019	Black Monday	Walter Darcy	Episode: "339"
2019	PEN15	Mr. Wyzell	2 episodes
2019	The Orville	Dr. Sherman	Episode: "Lasting Impressions"
2019	NASA's Unexplained Files	Himself, Astronomer	Episode: "Did Aliens Nuke Mars?"
2019	Swamp Thing	Dr. Chowodury/Marais Doctor	2 episodes
2019	American Horror Story: 1984	David Chambers	Episode: "Red Dawn"
2019	How to Get Away with Murder	Judge Kofi Bonaparte	Episode: "I Want to Be Free"
2020	The Resident	Tyrone Griffiths	Episode: "Last Shot"
2020	Stars in the House	Self	Episode: "Star Trek Voyager Reunion"
2020	The 41st Annual Young Artist Awards	Award presenter	
2020-2021	The Last Saturday Night	Allen	
2021	Them	The Custodian	2 episodes
2021	Welcome to the Christmas Family Reunion	Uncle Leon	TV film
2021	Hangin with Web Show	Self	Internet series, episode: "HWWS WebTV's New Year's Eve Party (Live Feed from Times Square NYC)"
2021-2022	The Center Seat: 55 Years of Star Trek	Self - Tuvok, Voyager	2 episodes
2021–2023	iCarly	Principal Ted Franklin	2 episodes
2022	4400	Elijah Landry	Episode: "You Only Meant Well"
2022	Classified	Director Branch	TV film
2022	The Rookie: Feds	Mel	Episode: "Felicia"
2022	The 43rd Annual Young Artists Awards	Award presenter	
2022	The What's Update with Xander Kwicien	Self - guest	Episode: "White Supremacy/Tim Russ"
2023	Poker Face	Max	Episode: "The Orpheus Syndrome"
2023	Star Trek: Picard	Captain Tuvok	2 episodes
2023	The Ready Room	Self - guest	Episode: "Dominion (aftershow)"
2023	The 7th Rule 2	Self	Episode: "Episode #1.112"
2024	NCIS	Dr. Erik Harper	Episode: "Heartless"
2024	Geeks and Nerds for Harris Live Organizing Call	Self	TV special
2024	Ted	ER Doctor	2 episodes
2024	Pristine and the High Ponies	Sports Announcer	Miniseries
2025	Unconventional	Collin Charles	2 episodes

Video games
Year	Title	Role	Notes
2000	Star Trek: Voyager – Elite Force	Lieutenant Commander Tuvok	
2003	Star Trek: Elite Force II	Lieutenant Commander Tuvok	
2005	Law & Order: Criminal Intent	Various	
2006	Lost Planet: Extreme Condition	Bandero	
2008	Lost Planet: Extreme Condition Colonies Edition	Shane Bandero	
2009	Stormrise	Donovan/Ranger Soldier	
2009	Marvel: Ultimate Alliance 2	War Machine	Credited as Timothy Russ
2009	Dragon Age: Origins	Zathrian the Keeper	
2012	The Secret World	Harrison Blake, Atticus Sawyer	
2013	Lightning Returns: Final Fantasy XIII	Additional voices	English dub
2014	Star Trek Online	Tuvok	
2014	The Elder Scrolls Online	Additional voices	
2015	Fallout 4	Lancer Captain Kells	
2016	Mirror's Edge: Catalyst	Birdman	
2016	Fallout 4: Far Harbor	Zealot Ware, Lancer Captain Kells	
2016	Mafia III	Additional voices	
2017	Wolfenstein II: The New Colossus	Joseph 'Gunslinger Joe' Stallion	
2017	Wolfenstein II: The Freedom Chronicles	Joseph Stallion	
2020	The Last of Us Part II	Additional Voices	
2020	World of Warcraft: Shadowlands	Thenios	
2021	Vegas Tales	Mr. Davenport	
2022	Horizon Forbidden West	Jetakka	
2023	Starfield	Dad, Guillaume Degarmo, Maurice Lyon	
2024	Lego Horizon Adventures	Sylens	
2024	The Elder Scrolls Online: Gold Road	Voice	
2026	Star Trek: Voyager – Across the Unknown	Lieutenant/Lieutenant Commander Tuvok	

Podcast Series
Year	Title	Role	Notes
2019	Greater Boston	Self	Episode: "S3.E13"
2020	Verbal Shenanigans	Self - guest	Episode: "#326-Tim Russ"
2021	Bronzeville	Self	2 episodes
2021	The Trek Files: A Roddenberry Star Trek Podcast	Self - guest	Episode: "7-23 - National Space Society speech - January 1989"
2021-2025	Inglorious Treksperts	Self	3 episodes
2022	Too Opinionated	Self	Episode: "Too Opinionated Interview - Tim Russ"
2022-2025	Treksperts Briefing Room	Self	2 episodes
2023	Shuttlepod Show	Self	Episode: "Russ Hour with Tim Russ"
2023	The Delta Fliers	Self - guest	Episode: "Tim Russ"
2024	Syfy Sistas	Self	Episode: "Tim Russ Live"
2024	Star Trek Politics	Panel guest	Episode: "Star Trek Las Vegas Politics Panel"
2024	Bloodhound	Martin Frauenfelder	7 episodes
2025	Star Trek: Khan	Ensign Tuvok	9 episodes
2026	Mission Log: A Roddenberry Star Trek Podcast	Self	Episode: "SUPPLEMENTAL: The One with Tim Russ"

Production
Year	Title	Notes
1997	East of Hope Street	Credited with Nate Thomas
2003	Roddenberry on Patrol	
2008	Divas of Novella	Co-producer
2010	War of Heaven	Short Film
2018	Junkie	Co-producer
2018	Dick Dickster	Executive producer

Writing
Year	Title	Notes
1997	East of Hope Street	Credited with Nate Thomas
2005	Dejà Vu	Short film
2006	Eye of the Beholder	Short film
2007	Story by Amy Niles	Short film
2007	Star Trek: Of Gods and Men	Fan production
2007	Plugged	Short film
2008	Tales from Dark Fall	Episode: "Scene Five"
2008	Mistaken Identity	Short film
2010	War of Heaven	Short film
2011	Play by Play	
2018	Junkie	Collaborating writer
2019	The Circuit: Star Crew	
2021	Into the Further	Script consultant

Directing
Year	Title	Notes
1998	Star Trek: Voyager	Episode: "Living Witness"
2001	The Heartbreak Cafe	Episode: "Decisions, Decisions"
2002-	Psychic Investigators	No end date listed on IMDB
2003	Roddenberry on Patrol	Short film
2003-2004	The F.B.I. Files	2 episodes
2005	Psychic Witness	Episode: "The Disappeared"
2005	Dejà Vu	Short film
2006	Eye of the Beholder	Short film
2007	Story by Amy Niles	Short film
2007	Star Trek: Of Gods and Men	Fan production
2007	Plugged	Short film satirizing advertising (in final edits)
2008	Divas of Novella	TV film
2008	Tales from Dark Fall	2 episodes
2008	Mistaken Identity	Short film
2010	War of Heaven	Short film
2010	Anneo's Song	Short film
2010	Andrea: Side Two	
2010	The Age of Alexandra	
2010	The Later Show	
2011	Perspectives	
2011-2025	Bloomers	23 episodes
2012	A Night at the Silent Movie Theater	
2014	Cavity	Short film
2015	Running to Live, Living to Run	Short film
2015	Rellik	TV movie
2015-2017	Star Trek: Renegades	Fan production, 2 episodes
2017	Ernesto's Miracle	Short film
2017	Borderclash 4: Cognitive Dissonance	Short film
2017	Renegades	2 episodes
2018	Well, Maybe There Are Some Small Parts	Short film
2018	Junkie	
2019	The Circuit: Star Crew	
2019	Tenet Noctis	Short film
2021	Life on the Rocks	
2021	Vampire Slayer	
2021	Renegades: Ominara	
2024	12 Sided Die	8 episodes
2024-2025	12 Sided Die: Side Quests	6 episodes

== Discography ==
- Tim Russ (2000)
- Kushangaza (2001)
- Brave New World (2003)
- ...2nd Thoughts (2007)
