= Star Trek Generations =

1994 film by David Carson

- Theatrical release poster art
- Directed by: David Carson
- Screenplay by: Ronald D. Moore; Brannon Braga
- Story by: Rick Berman; Ronald D. Moore; Brannon Braga
- Based on: Star Trek by Gene Roddenberry
- Produced by: Rick Berman
- Starring: Patrick Stewart; Jonathan Frakes; Brent Spiner; Levar Burton; Michael Dorn; Gates McFadden; Marina Sirtis; Malcolm McDowell; James Doohan; Walter Koenig; William Shatner
- Cinematography: John A. Alonzo
- Edited by: Peter E. Berger
- Music by: Dennis McCarthy
- Production company: Paramount Pictures
- Distributed by: Paramount Pictures
- Release date: November 18, 1994
- Running time: 118 minutes
- Country: United States
- Language: English
- Budget: $35 million
- Box office: $118 million

Star Trek Generations is a 1994 American science fiction film and the seventh installment in the Star Trek film series. Malcolm McDowell joins cast members from the 1966 television show Star Trek and the 1987 sequel series The Next Generation, including William Shatner and Patrick Stewart. In the film, Captain Jean-Luc Picard of the USS Enterprise-D joins forces with Captain James T. Kirk to stop the villain Dr Tolian Soran from destroying a planetary system in his attempt to return to an extra-dimensional realm known as the Nexus.

Generations was conceived as a transition from the original cast of the Star Trek films to the cast of The Next Generation. After developing several film ideas concurrently, the producers chose a script written by Ronald D. Moore and Brannon Braga. Production began while the final season of the television series was being made. The director was David Carson, who previously directed episodes of the television series; photography was by franchise newcomer John A. Alonzo. Filming took place on the Paramount Studios lots, and on location in Valley of Fire State Park, Nevada, and Lone Pine, California. The film's climax was revised and reshot following poor reception from test audiences. The film uses a mix of traditional optical effects alongside computer-generated imagery and was scored by regular Star Trek composer Dennis McCarthy.

Star Trek Generations was released in the United States on November 18, 1994. Paramount promoted the film with merchandising tie-ins, including toys, books, games, and a website—a first for a major motion picture. The film opened at the top of the United States box office its first week of release and grossed a total of $118 million worldwide. Critical reception was mixed, with critics divided on the film's characters and comprehensibility to a casual viewer. It was followed by Star Trek: First Contact in 1996.

== Plot ==
In 2293, retired Starfleet officers James T. Kirk, Montgomery Scott, and Pavel Chekov attend the maiden voyage of the USS Enterprise-B. During the shakedown cruise, the starship is pressed into a rescue mission to save two El-Aurian refugee ships that a massive energy ribbon has snared. Enterprise saves some of the refugees before their ships are destroyed, but becomes trapped by the ribbon, and Kirk goes to a control room to help the ship escape. While Enterprise is freed, Kirk is presumed lost in space and dead after the trailing end of the ribbon tears open the ship's hull.

In 2371, the crew of the USS Enterprise-D is in a holodeck computer simulation, celebrating the promotion of shipmate Worf to lieutenant commander. Captain Jean-Luc Picard learns his brother and nephew have been killed in a fire, and is distraught that the Picard family line will end with him. Enterprise receives a distress call from a stellar observatory, where an El-Aurian, Dr. Tolian Soran, launches a probe at the nearby star. The probe causes the star to implode, creating a shockwave that destroys its planetary system. Soran kidnaps Enterprise engineer Geordi La Forge and is transported off the station by a Klingon Bird of Prey belonging to the Duras sisters.

Enterprise crewmember Guinan tells Picard that she and Soran were among the El-Aurians rescued in 2293. Soran—who lost his family when their homeworld was destroyed by the Borg—is obsessed with returning to the energy ribbon to reach the "Nexus", an extra-dimensional realm of wish fulfillment outside normal space-time. Picard and Data determine that Soran, unable to safely fly a ship directly into the ribbon, is altering its path by removing the gravitational effects of nearby stars. Soran plans to destroy another star to bring the ribbon to the planet Veridian III, consequently killing millions on a nearby inhabited planet, Veridian IV.

Upon entering the Veridian system, Picard offers himself to the Duras sisters in exchange for La Forge but insists on being transported to Soran directly. La Forge is returned to Enterprise, but unwittingly exposes the ship's defense details through the transmitter installed in his VISOR device. The Duras sisters attack, and Enterprise sustains critical damage before destroying the Bird of Prey by triggering its cloaking device, and firing photon torpedoes when its shields drop. When La Forge reports that the starship is about to suffer a warp-core breach as a result of the attack, Commander William Riker evacuates everyone to the forward saucer section of the starship, which separates from the engineering section just before the breach occurs. The resulting shockwave sends the saucer-section crashing onto the surface of Veridian IV.

Picard fails to stop Soran from launching another probe. The Veridian star's resulting destruction alters the ribbon's course, and Picard and Soran enter the Nexus before the shockwave destroys Veridian III. Picard is surrounded by an idealized family, but realizes it is an illusion. He is met by an "echo" of Guinan left behind in the Nexus. Guinan sends him to meet James T. Kirk, who is safe in the Nexus. Though Kirk is initially entranced by the opportunity the Nexus offers to atone for past regrets, he realizes it lacks danger and excitement. Having learned that they can travel whenever and wherever desired through the Nexus, Picard convinces Kirk to return with him to Veridian III, shortly before Soran launches the probe.

Working together, Kirk and Picard distract Soran long enough for Picard to lock the probe in place; it explodes on the launchpad and kills Soran. Kirk is fatally injured in the effort, and Picard buries him at the site. Three Federation starships arrive to retrieve the Enterprise survivors from Veridian IV. Picard muses that, given the ship's legacy, the Enterprise-D will not be the last vessel to carry the name.

== Cast ==
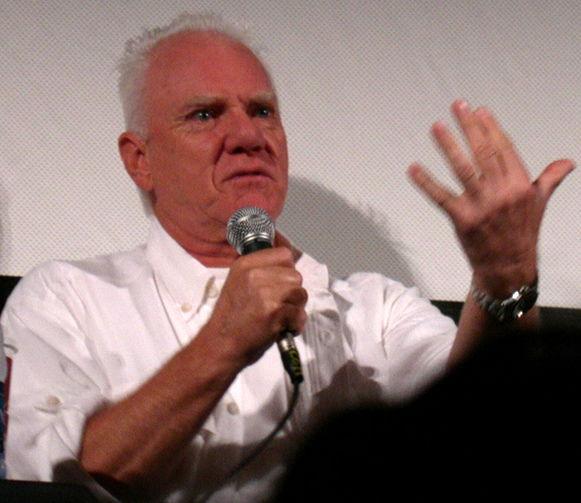
Malcolm McDowell (pictured in 2007) requested his character not have alien features to avoid lengthy sessions in the makeup chair.

The main cast of Star Trek: The Next Generation reprise their roles in Generations: Patrick Stewart as Captain Jean-Luc Picard, Jonathan Frakes as Commander William Riker, LeVar Burton as Chief Engineer Lieutenant Commander Geordi La Forge, Brent Spiner as Lieutenant Commander Data, Gates McFadden as Chief Medical Officer Commander Beverly Crusher, Michael Dorn as Lieutenant Commander Worf, and Marina Sirtis as ship's counselor Commander Deanna Troi. Recurring characters from the series return, including Barbara March and Gwynyth Walsh as the villainous Klingon sisters Lursa and B'Etor Duras, Patti Yasutake as Enterprise nurse Lieutenant Alyssa Ogawa, and Whoopi Goldberg as Guinan.

Malcolm McDowell plays Tolian Soran, the film's antagonist. Marlon Brando wanted to play the role and informed producer Rick Berman about it, but Shelley Lanberg turned him down due to his high price demands. McDowell had worked with Stewart on stage decades earlier, and relished the chance to kill Shatner's character. He liked his character's spiked hair and black ensemble, and requested that his character not have alien features to avoid lengthy makeup sessions.

In the film's initial script, the entire principal cast of The Original Series was featured, but only three members appear in the film: William Shatner as Kirk, James Doohan as Scott, and Walter Koenig as Chekov. Leonard Nimoy and DeForest Kelley declined to appear as their characters Spock and Leonard McCoy. Nimoy felt there were story problems with the script and that Spock's role was extraneous. Producer Rick Berman told the press, "Both Leonard Nimoy and DeForest Kelley felt they made a proper goodbye in the last movie." Nimoy and Kelley's lines were subsequently modified for Doohan and Koenig. The news that not all of the Original Series cast was in the film was not passed to all of The Next Generation actors. When Goldberg arrived on set on her first day, she immediately asked to see Nichelle Nichols, who portrayed Nyota Uhura in The Original Series. When told that Nichols was not in the film, she said to Koenig, "The fans have been waiting for years to see Nichelle and me and Uhura and Guinan on screen together." Patrick Stewart said that he had made an effort to ensure the original cast's involvement in the film: "I didn't want us to sail into the future just as The Next Generation cast."

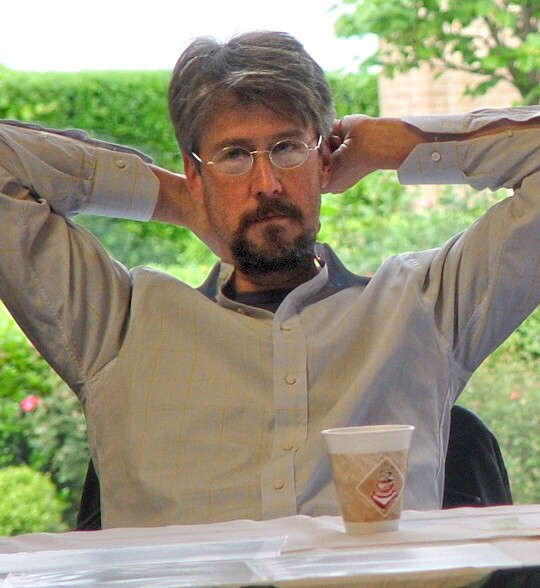
Alan Ruck (2004)

Alan Ruck plays Enterprise-B captain John Harriman. When approached for the role, Ruck assumed he would play an alien, saying, "Look, when I shave every day, I don't look in the mirror and say, 'Hey! There's a starship commander.'" Berman informed him that the character was from a wealthy and connected family, and was placed in command as a stepping stone to a political career. Jacqueline Kim plays Enterprise-B helmsman Demora Sulu. Kim consulted with art supervisor Michael Okuda to make sure her hand movements and manipulations of the ships' controls were consistent and accurate. Glenn Morshower played an Enterprise-B navigator; he apologized to the director for a poor first rehearsal, because as a Star Trek fan he was unused to performing along with actors he had idolized for years.

Many of the minor characters throughout the film appeared in different roles in the television series. Tim Russ, who appears as an Enterprise-B bridge officer, played a terrorist in "Starship Mine" and a Klingon in "Invasive Procedures", and later joined the cast of Star Trek: Voyager as the Vulcan Tuvok. Various background roles were played by the main cast's stunt doubles.

== Production ==
=== Development ===
In 1992, months before the official announcement of a followup to Star Trek VI: The Undiscovered Country, Paramount Pictures executives approached Star Trek: The Next Generation producer Rick Berman about creating another feature film. Berman informed writers Ronald D. Moore and Brannon Braga that Paramount had approved a two-picture deal approximately midway through The Next Generation's sixth season. Moore and Braga, convinced Berman had called them into his office to tell them The Next Generation was cancelled and they were out of a job, were instead given the task of writing the film. Berman also worked with former Next Generation producer Maurice Hurley to develop possible story ideas, intending to develop two film scripts simultaneously and prioritize whichever was most promising. Executive producer Michael Piller turned down the opportunity to develop ideas, objecting to what he saw as a competition for the job. Moore and Braga's script was ultimately chosen. The writers spent weeks developing the story with Berman, before taking a working vacation in May 1993 to write the first-draft screenplay, completed June 1.

Moore described Generations as a project with several required elements. Berman felt that having the original cast of the previous Star Trek films felt like a "good way to pass the baton" to the next series. The studio wanted the original cast to only appear in the first minutes and Kirk only recurring at the end of the film. Other requests included a Khan Noonien Singh–like antagonist, Klingons, and a humorous Data plot. At one point, the writers toyed with the idea of pitting the two crews against each other. "We were obsessed with the poster image of the two Enterprises locked in combat: Kirk vs. Picard, One Must Die!" said Moore. Ultimately, the writers could not come up with a plausible explanation for such a conflict, and abandoned the idea.

In the initial draft of the screenplay, the original series cast appeared in a prologue, and Guinan served as the bridge between the two generations. The opening shot would have been the entire cast crammed into an elevator, happy to be back together. The Enterprise-D's destruction also appeared—the saucer crash had first been proposed by Moore as the conclusion to part one of a sixth-season cliffhanger story that was scrapped. Kirk's death was developed in Braga, Moore, and Berman's story sessions. Moore recalled that "we wanted to aim high, do something different and big... We knew we had to have a strong Picard story arc, so what are the profound things in a man's life he has to face? Mortality tops the list." After the idea of killing off a Next Generation cast member was vetoed, someone suggested that Kirk die instead. "We all sorta looked around and said, 'That might be it'", Moore said. The studio and William Shatner had few concerns about the plot point.

Refining the script meant facing the realities of budget constraints. The initial proposal included location shooting in Hawaii, Idaho, and the Midwestern United States, and the total budget was over $30 million. The budget dropped to $25 million after negotiations. A revised version of the script from March 1994 incorporated feedback from the producers, studio, actors, and director. The writers changed one sequence where Harriman trained his predecessors in the Enterprise-B's operation after Shatner felt the scene's joke went too far. Picard's personal tragedy was written as his brother Robert's heart attack, but Stewart suggested the loss of his entire family to add emotional impact. The opening sequence took place on the solar observatory with two Rosencrantz and Guildenstern–influenced characters talking shortly before an enemy attack; Next Generation writer Jeri Taylor suggested that the opening should be something "fun", leading to the switch to the holodeck scene.

Leonard Nimoy turned down the chance to direct the feature. The producers chose David Carson. The British director had no feature film experience, but had directed several episodes of Star Trek, including the Next Generation episode "Yesterday's Enterprise" and the Deep Space Nine pilot "Emissary".

=== Design ===
Star Trek veteran Herman Zimmerman served as production designer, collaborating with illustrator John Eaves for many designs. Zimmerman's approach to realizing a vision of the future was to take existing designs and use them in a different manner to express living in the future. Taking cues from director Nicholas Meyer's approach to Star Trek II: The Wrath of Khan, Zimmerman noted that future humanity will still have the same furniture needs, so a logical approach was to start with what would remain the same and work from there.

Transitioning from television to film meant that sets and designs needed to be more detailed, with a higher level of polish to stand up on the big screen. Zimmerman felt obliged to improve the sets fans had watched for seven seasons, especially the bridge. Zimmerman repainted the set, added computer consoles, raised the captain's chair for a more commanding presence, and reworked the bridge's ceiling struts; he had always been unhappy with how the ceiling looked, but never had the time or money to rework it.

The script called for an entirely new location on the Enterprise-D: stellar cartography. The script described the location as a small room with maps on one wall. Finding the concept uninteresting, Zimmerman designed a three-story circular set to give the impression the actors were inside a star map dominated by screens. Zimmerman's previous work designing a crisis management center influenced the design. The backlit starmaps that covered three-quarters of the wall would have been infeasible to create in the years before the rise of large-format inkjet printers and computer graphics software. The starmaps were replaced with a bluescreen for scenes where the static images would be replaced by computer-animated star maps by Santa Barbara Studios. Stellar cartography was one of the largest sets ever constructed on a Paramount lot.

The film marked the first appearance of the starship Enterprise-B. The ship was a modification of the Excelsior, a model designed and built by Bill George and effects house Industrial Light & Magic (ILM) for Star Trek III: The Search for Spock a decade earlier. Co-producer Peter Lauritson, illustrator John Eaves, and Zimmerman designed the Enterprise-B with additions to its hull, some of which were added so that they could depict damage to the ship without harming the underlying model's surface, and to improve the look of the ship when it was filmed from angles called for in the script. The ship's bridge was based on previous designs for the Enterprise-A and Excelsior sets Zimmerman had created for The Undiscovered Country, using pieces from each. The surrounding spacedock for Enterprise's maiden voyage was a modification of the model created for Star Trek: The Motion Picture (1979), refurbished and modified to better fit the film's anamorphic screen frame.

Like Zimmerman, George took the opportunity of the Enterprise-D's screen debut to touch up the model. Because Generations featured the Enterprise-D separating into its saucer and engineering sections, the original 6-foot (1.8 m) model built by ILM for the television series was removed from storage. The model was stripped, rewired, and its surface detailed to stand up to scrutiny. George changed the paint job, as he recalled they had been in a rush to prepare the model for television and its green-and-blue color scheme did not properly read on film. The paint scheme was shifted towards a "battleship grey", with glossy tiled areas reminiscent of the original feature film Enterprise.

While Generations made use of new sets and props, set decorator John M. Dwyer reused existing props or made new ones out of premade materials where possible, rather than spend money on new items: a torture device was created from a birthing chair, nose hair clippers, and flashlights; packing materials formed the shapes of set walls for the Bird of Prey bridge; and Soran's missile used a bird feeder and other garden store supplies for its interior elements. The stellar observatory set was filled with props from The Next Generation, with some added in deliberate nods to past episodes. Other reused sets included the Klingon bridge built for Star Trek IV: The Voyage Home and ribbed plastic walls in the Jefferies tubes, repurposed from the sets of The Hunt for Red October. Original set pieces and props included paintings for the settings in the Nexus.

Robert Blackman, The Next Generation's long-serving costume designer re-designed the Starfleet uniforms which the Enterprise-D crew would wear in the film. Blackman crafted militaristic-looking uniforms with rank sleeves inspired by The Original Series, high collars, and jackets reminiscent of the uniforms developed for The Wrath of Khan. The redesign was abandoned, and the cast wore combinations of the uniforms from The Next Generation and Deep Space Nine; the only new addition was an Eaves-designed angular communications badge that replaced the previous oval shape. Time was so short that Jonathan Frakes and Levar Burton borrowed the costumes from Deep Space Nine actors Avery Brooks and Colm Meaney. Also created by Blackman was a skydiving outfit worn by Shatner; though the scene was cut from the film, the costume was used in the Voyager episode "Extreme Risk".

=== Filming ===
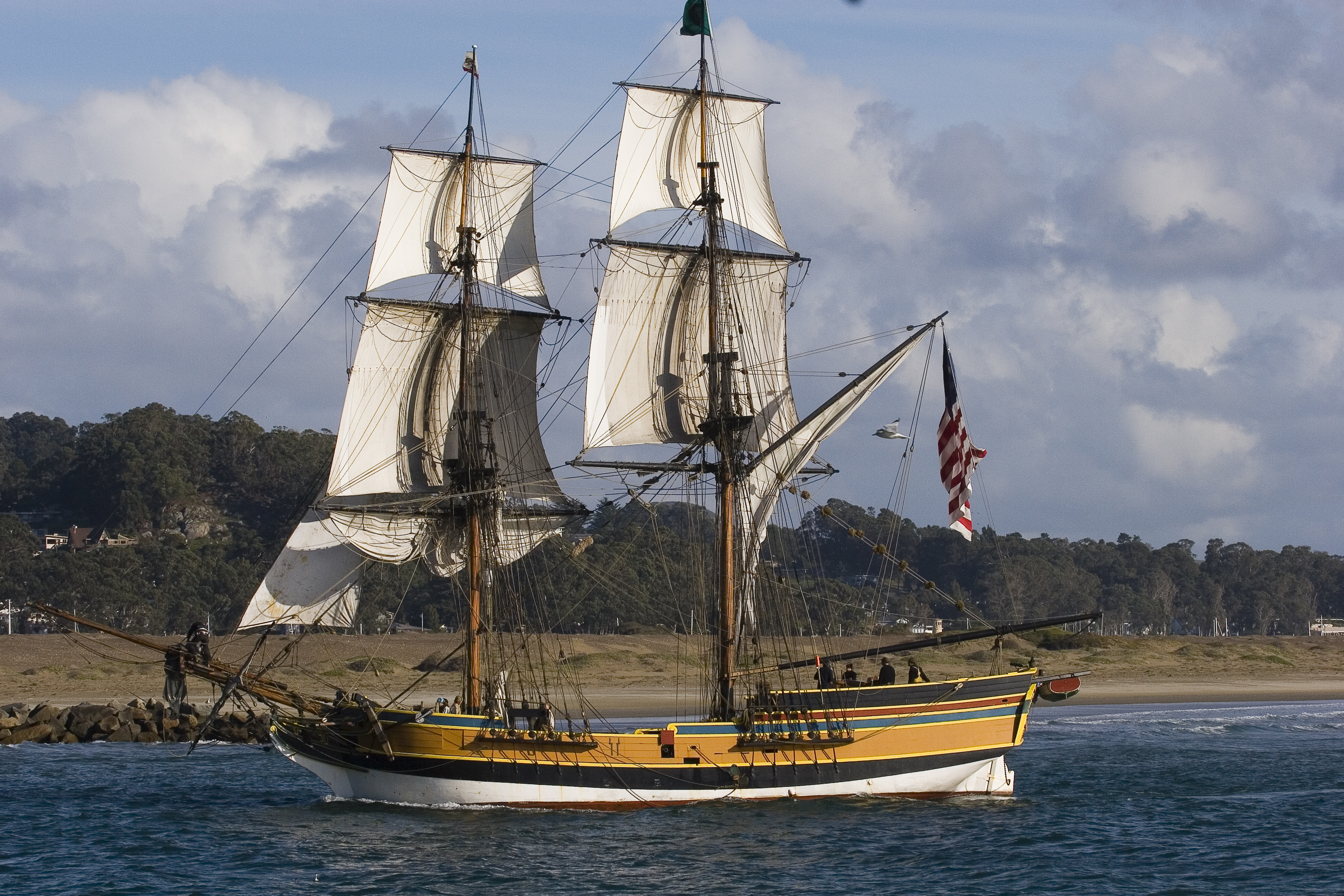
Lady Washington stood in as a holodeck recreation of a sailing ship Enterprise.

Berman backed Carson's choice to hire John A. Alonzo, the director of photography for Chinatown and Scarface. Alonzo was shown more than a dozen Star Trek episodes to familiarize himself with the franchise. He favored lighting scenes as much as possible from within the sets rather than staging lights and flags for each shot. Carson credited this approach with saving time and allowing more freedom when shooting. He later wrote that the production moved at a "TV-like" pace; principal photography concluded after 51 days.

Filming commenced on March 28, 1994. Generations and The Next Generation were filmed simultaneously on different soundstages on the Paramount Studios lot. Scenes that did not feature the television series regulars were filmed first, starting with those in the Enterprise-B deflector room. The scenes of Harriman, Chekov, and Scott reacting to Kirk's apparent death were filmed a week later, to allow time for the deflector room to be suitably distressed to visualize the damage.

Stage 7 was where the Enterprise-B's bridge, deflector room, and corridors were built and filmed. The jolts and shocks of the ship in the hold of the energy ribbon were created by camera bumps and motors to shake the set. Filming of the scenes took place in April 1994, while residents were still skittish from the recent 1994 Northridge earthquake; the effects staff deliberately hid the set shakers until cameras were rolling to elicit more genuine reactions. The stellar observatory set was an elaborate redress of the Enterprise-B's bridge, with added levels and swapped walls changing the layout. Control panels styled after those in the original Star Trek series helped suggest the age of the station.

The cast of The Next Generation started filming their scenes for Generations four days after wrapping on the show. After the filming of the series was complete, there were only six months remaining before the film's release date. The Enterprise-D crash scenes were filmed mid-May 1994, and were among the last remaining shots before the existing Next Generation sets were demolished to make way for Star Trek: Voyager. As a result, the crew distressed the sets for the crash damage more than would have been normal during the series' run.

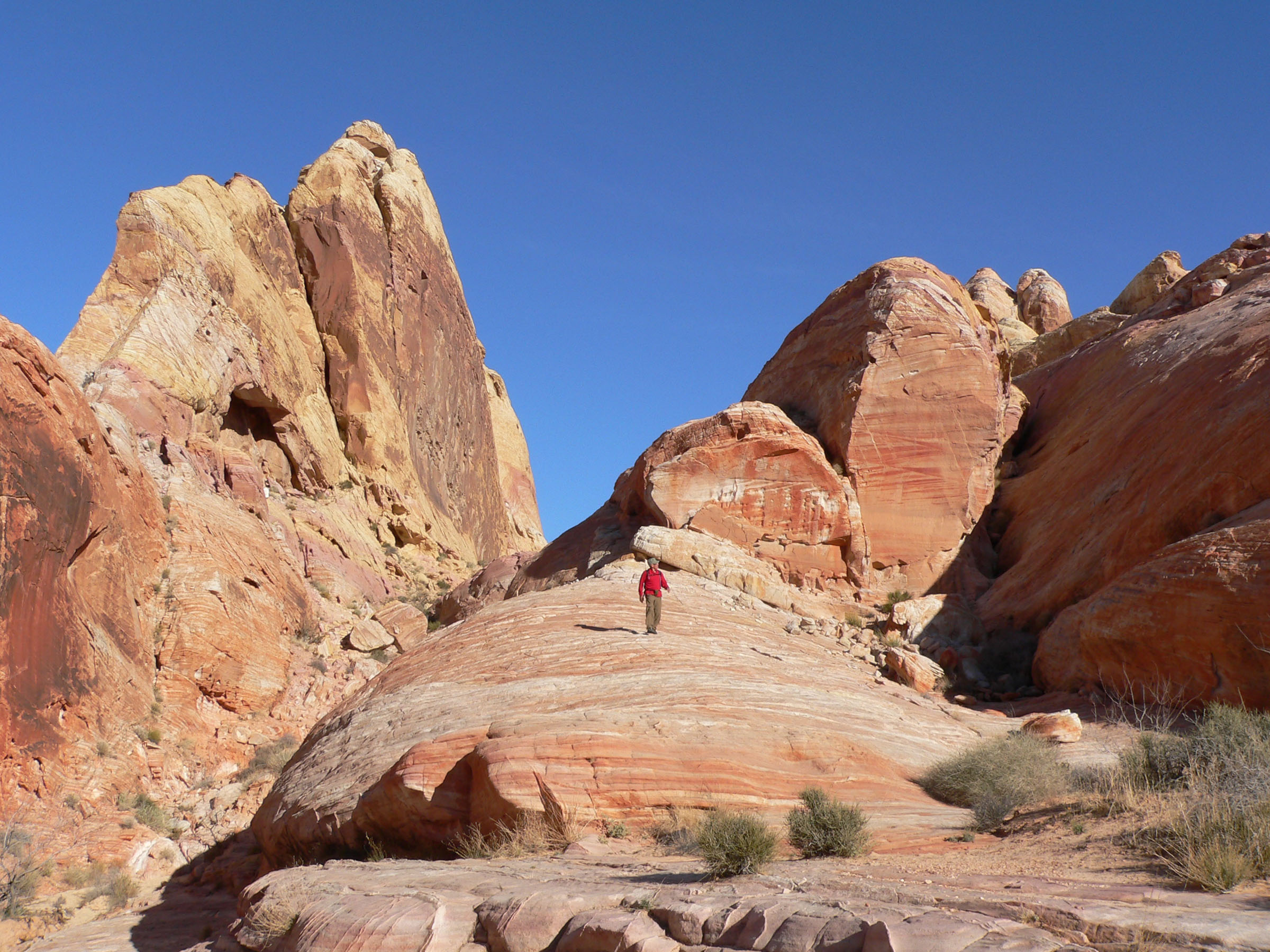
High cliffs and areas like this in Valley of Fire State Park served as the alien planet Veridian III.

Despite the budget cuts, Generations shot many scenes on location. The rushed pace of filming meant that not all locations had been selected before the start of principal photography, and the production was still scouting locations until two weeks before the final scenes. The production exhausted possible options within Los Angeles' studio zone and looked up to 150 miles (240 km) away for suitable locations. The Enterprise-D promotion ceremony on the holodeck was filmed on Lady Washington, a full-scale replica of the first American sailing ship to visit Japan. Carson fought hard to keep the shoot during budget trims, deciding to sacrifice other days in the schedule to keep the scene. Lady Washington was anchored at Marina del Rey and sailed out a few miles from shore over five days of shooting. Some of Lady Washington's crew appeared amongst Enterprise crew members.

Picard's house in the Nexus was a private home in Pasadena, California; almost all the furnishings were custom props or outside items. Portions of the scene were shot in May 1994, followed by new shoots five months later. The revisions included adding Picard's nephew René to his imagined Christmas celebration with his family. The house of Kirk's Nexus recollections was located in Lone Pine, California, with the cabin filled with props to represent Kirk's career, from a Klingon bat'leth to a painting of his Enterprise.

Carson wanted a suitably remote and alien mountain location for the film's climax at Soran's compound. The scenes were filmed over eight days on an elevated plateau in the "Valley of Fire", north-east of Las Vegas, Nevada. The rise's height and sloped sides required cast and crew to climb 160 feet (49 m) using safety ropes and carry all provisions and equipment with them. The 110 °F (43 °C) heat was difficult for all involved, especially Shatner, who wore a wool costume. Safety harnesses and wires used to keep performers safe from tumbling off a precipice were removed digitally in postproduction.

As originally filmed, Kirk was shot in the back and killed by Soran. Test audiences reacted negatively to the death, so the scene was rewritten and reshot over two weeks so that Kirk sacrifices himself by leaping across a broken walkway to retrieve Soran's control pad and de-cloak the probe. Paramount allowed the film to go over budget to $35 million for the re-shoots. As the production crew had already spent weeks removing traces of their shoot from the Valley of Fire, the set had to be rebuilt under a very tight schedule, followed by effects work to remove wires and rigging in time for the footage to be included in the final cut.

=== Effects ===
Generations' special effects tasks were split between the television series' effects vendors and ILM. ILM CG Supervisor John Schlag recalled that it was easy to recruit staff who wanted to work on Star Trek; working on the film "gave me a chance to be a part of the whole Trek thing ... ILM is practically an entire company filled with Trek geeks". The screenwriters filled the initial drafts with exciting—and expensive—effects. Effects supervisor John Knoll's team then storyboarded the effects sequences, figuring out how to best service the script as cheaply as possible. When even those estimates proved too costly, ILM continued cutting shots. "[We had] nothing left to cut, and we still had to cut stuff out", Knoll recalled.

Previous Star Trek films had used conventional motion control techniques to record multiple passes of the starship models and miniatures. For Generations, the effects artists began using computer-generated imagery (CGI) and models for certain shots. No physical shooting models were built for the refugee ships, although George recalled that he created a quick physical miniature for CG modeler Rob Coleman to develop his ideas from, rather than try to articulate his feedback without it. Other CG elements included the solar collapses and the Veridian III planet. Knoll used a digital version of the Enterprise-D for the warp effect; the limitations of the motion-control programming and slitscan effect for the original meant that the effect "barely holds up", Knoll said, whereas the CG recreation could keep consistent lighting throughout. While digital techniques were used for many sequences and ships, a few new models were physically built; these included the observatory, built by model shop foreman John Goodson.

The climactic battle between the Enterprise and the Klingons over Veridian III was accomplished using traditional motion control, but without the budget for practical explosions and special breakaway models, impacts and battle damage were simulated with practical compositing tricks and computer-generated effects. The destruction of the Bird of Prey was a reuse of footage from The Undiscovered Country. Weapons fire and energy bolts were hand-animated, but Knoll had a different idea for the photon torpedoes. A fan of the impressive, arcing look of the torpedoes from The Motion Picture, Knoll scanned in footage from the film and turned to computer-generated effects. A simulator program created a similar look that could be animated from any point the effects artists wanted, without the expense and tedium required—shining lasers through a crystal in a smoky environment—to recreate the look optically.

The ribbon and the Enterprise in this scene are computer-generated; because the camera is following Enterprise so closely, the effects artists had to make sure the modeling held up to the scrutiny of the big screen.

Carson described the Nexus energy ribbon as the true villain of the film; ILM was responsible for conceiving what the ribbon would look like with no natural frame of reference. "When creating something from scratch, it's always important to rough out the whole thing... because there are so many paths you can explore, it's easy to get bogged down", recalled effects co-supervisor Alex Seiden, who had worked as a technical director on the planetary explosion of Praxis from The Undiscovered Country. Knoll decided the ribbon was a rip through universes, filled with chaotic energy, taking inspiration from images he had seen of magnetic fields around Uranus from a Jet Propulsion Laboratory simulation. The airfoil-shaped core of the undulating ribbon was enhanced with electric tendrils. To sell the ribbon's vastness in space shots where no sense of scale would be available, Seiden and George created a debris field of embers that trailed the ribbon. The inside of the ribbon was conceptualized as similar to a dense electrical storm, with electricity fogging the screen. Because of the complex interplay of the ribbon elements with the ships that would be trapped within it, ILM decided the refugee ships and Enterprise-B should be CG models. To make the switch between computer-generated and motion-control passes of the physical model appear seamless, ILM created a wireframe of the physical model, with the computer-generated model's textures taken from photos of the physical model, shot in flat light with a long lens. The tendril strike that sends Kirk into the Nexus was simulated with the layering of multiple pieces of animation, including CG explosions Knoll rendered on his personal computer and a recycled explosion effect from The Empire Strikes Back.

The Enterprise-D crash sequence was filmed in a 40-by-80-foot (12 by 24 m) forest floor set extended by matte paintings, built outside so ILM could use natural light. A 12-foot (3.7 m) model Enterprise saucer was constructed specifically for the shots; the model's size gave it the right sense of scale for flying dirt and debris, an illusion enhanced by shooting with a high-speed camera to give the saucer the expected slow movement of a massive object. ILM shot its crew members walking about their parking lot and matted the footage onto the top of the saucer to represent Starfleet personnel evacuating the saucer section.

=== Music ===
Dennis McCarthy, the principal composer for The Next Generation, was given the task of writing Generations' score. McCarthy became the first Star Trek composer to work on both television and film projects. Critic Jeff Bond wrote that while McCarthy's score was "tasked with straddling the styles of both series", it offered the opportunity for the composer to produce stronger dramatic writing. The film's opening music is a choral piece that plays while a floating champagne bottle tumbles through space. For the action scenes with the Enterprise-B, McCarthy used low brass chords. Kirk was given a brass motif accented by snare drums (a sound not used on The Next Generation), while the scene ends with dissonant notes as Scott and Chekov discover Kirk has been blown into space.

McCarthy expanded his brassy style for the film's action sequences, such as the battle over Veridian III and the crash-landing of the Enterprise-D. For Picard's trip to the Nexus, more choral music and synthesizers accompany Picard's discovery of his family. A broad fanfare—the film's only distinct theme—first plays when Picard and Kirk meet. This theme blends McCarthy's theme for Picard from The Next Generation's first season, notes from the theme for Deep Space Nine, and Alexander Courage's Star Trek theme. For the final battle of Kirk and Picard against Soran, McCarthy used staccato music to accentuate the fistfight. For Kirk's death, McCarthy mated lyrical strings with another statement of the Courage theme, while a shot of Picard standing over Kirk's grave is scored with more pomp. The Courage theme plays again at the film's close.

The original soundtrack was released in 1994 on cassette tape and CD. In 2013, GNP Crescendo Records rereleased the soundtrack as a two-disc, expanded collector's edition including previously unheard tracks.

== Release ==
=== Marketing ===
The marketing of Generations included a website, the first to officially publicize a motion picture. The site was a success, being viewed millions of times worldwide in the weeks leading to the film's release, at a time when fewer than a million Americans had internet access. Paramount also promoted the film on the Prodigy online service.

Tie-in merchandise released to promote the film included collectible cups and calendars from Jack in the Box, promotional kiosks at Kmart stores, and action figures. Due to production timelines, these figures wore the Blackman-designed Starfleet uniforms that were ultimately unused in the film itself. Other collectibles included a 600,000-run special issue of Entertainment Weekly dedicated to the film, and stamps and souvenir sheets produced by Guyana. A novelization of the film written by J. M. Dillard spent three weeks on The New York Times Best Seller list. Paramount's licensing group estimated promotional partners could add up to $15 million in the film's support.

Several tie-in video games were released to tie in with the film's release. Absolute Entertainment published Star Trek VII: Generations: Beyond the Nexus for the Game Boy and the Game Gear handheld devices. Three years after the film, MicroProse produced Star Trek VII: Generations, which featured the film's cast as voice actors. The game roughly followed the plot of the film with most of the game played in a first-person perspective.

Versions of the film's script leaked out in advance of the film. A bootleg script revealed the energy ribbon and Kirk's death; James Doohan confirmed the script's authenticity at a fan convention in March 1994, but his agent denied he had seen the finished script. In September, another copy of the film's script leaked onto the internet. As a result, news of Kirk's death was widespread.

=== Box office ===
Star Trek Generations was previewed in the United States and Canada on November 17, 1994, and grossed $3 million from 1,525 theaters. The film opened to a wide release in 2,659 theaters the following day and grossed $23.1 million during the opening weekend, averaging $8,694 per theatre. It was the highest-grossing film during the first week of its release in the United States, staying in the top ten for a further four weeks. The film went on to gross $75,671,125 in the United States and Canada and $42,400,000 internationally, making $118 million worldwide against a $35 million budget. In the United Kingdom, Generations opened on February 10, 1995, at number one with £2,040,000. In Japan, the film grossed $1.2 million its opening weekend, a large amount considering the franchise's usual poor performance in that market. Given its moderate budget, Generations's gross was considered a success.

== Reception ==
Star Trek Generations earned mixed reviews from critics and fans. On the review aggregator website Rotten Tomatoes, 48% of 65 critics' reviews are positive, with an average rating of 5.5/10. The website's consensus reads: "Generations stands as a mediocre changing of the guard for crews of the Enterprise, with a dull plot that sometimes seems like an expanded episode of the television series." Metacritic, which uses a weighted average, assigned the film a score of 55 out of 100, based on 22 critics, indicating "mixed or average" reviews. Audiences surveyed by CinemaScore assigned the film an average grade of "B+" on its A+ to F scale. Writing about the film decades later, Den of Geek described the film as divisive, and Tor.com noted the film had been picked apart for years by fans and the film's own writers. In 2001, the BBC gave it 2 of 5 stars, summarizing, "Devotees may find it necessary (if depressing) viewing."

Critics complained the film felt like an overly long episode of the television series. The Orlando Sentinel's Jay Boyar agreed, but said the film minimized the television series' tendency to "bog down" by moving to the next scene before boredom could set in. Kenneth Turan called the film safe, and said that it relied heavily on viewers' appreciation for the Star Trek television series. Jay Carr of The Boston Globe described the film as "reassuringly predictable", saying that it featured elements that would be recognizable by the fans of both series but that the lack of surprises was a benefit.

Cinefantastique's Steve Biodrowski praised some of the big-budget touches the film brought to the franchise, but wrote that most of the attempts such as John Alonzo's cinematography seemed to backfire. In contrast, Carrie Rickey of The Philadelphia Inquirer and Den of Geek's Chris Cummins praised Alonzo's work as one of the few bright spots of the film; "[Alonzo] makes the Enterprise look like an actual lived-in starship," Cummins wrote, and "for the first time ever, the crew of the Enterprise-D looked like they were truly in outer space". Elizabeth Renzetti from The Globe and Mail praised the film for its special effects, but felt they were not strong enough to cover the weak plotting.

Opinions were divided on whether or not the film was accessible to non-Star Trek fans. Critics such as The New York Times' Janet Maslin suggested that despite being "predictably flabby and impenetrable in places" and suffering from technobabble, there was enough action and spectacle to engage others. Boyar felt that specific plot beats would fly over the heads of casual viewers, but the film's innate sense of fun would keep them engaged. Others considered the film inaccessible to neophytes, and too preoccupied with fan-focused elements that detracted from the overall story, with Roger Ebert critiquing the movie as being "...so concerned with in-jokes and updates for Trekkers that it [could] barely tear itself away long enough to tell a story".

The meeting of Kirk and Picard prompted comparisons between the two respective actors; Stewart's performance was often considered superior. James Berardinelli and Ebert wrote that Kirk's lack of presence through much of the film was still keenly felt. Biodrowski wrote that Shatner's hammy acting was a better fit for the film than Stewart's subtle delivery, while Boyar thought Shatner did a good job playing a straight man in the final sequences and injecting more fun into the film. The Baltimore Sun's Stephen Hunter considered Shatner and Stewart emblematic of two different eras of stardom, and that Stewart's commanding presence "wipes poor, saintly old Shatner off the screen". Cinefantastique and others criticized the scenes between Kirk and Picard as lacking.

McDowell's turn as Soran received differing opinions. Berardinelli and Rickey called Soran a weak and ill-defined villain, and Hunter dismissed Soran as a nemesis unworthy of the titanic meeting of Kirk and Picard. People's Ralph Novak called Soran a "standard-issue Trek villain", while Maslin, Newsweek's Michel Marriott, and Entertainment Weekly's Lisa Schwarzbaum enjoyed the performance. Novak wrote that Data's subplot of learning about emotions was a highlight and probably the most enjoyable part of the film for non-fans, while Ebert said that the premise "could have led to some funny scenes, but doesn't". Coates summed up the subplot as "dreary".

== Home media ==
Generations was released on LaserDisc in the United States on July 18, 1995, followed by a September release in Japan. It was also released on the United Kingdom in 1995 in the PAL format. The film was released in the UK on VHS on 28 December 1998. It was given a DVD release in 1998, with a non-anamorphic transfer and no special features. It later received a British DVD release on October 2, 2000. A new anamorphic transfer formed the basis of a 2004 special edition, with audio and text commentaries and special featurettes. The film was released on Blu-ray in 2009 as part of a box set of The Next Generation films, along with additional material. The four Next Generation feature films were released on Ultra HD Blu-ray on April 4, 2023, in standalone and collected formats.
