= Terrence Evans =

American stage and screen actor

- Born: Terrence Howard Evans; June 21, 1934; Sharon, Pennsylvania, U.S.
- Died: August 7, 2015 (aged 81); Burbank, California, U.S.
- Education: Carnegie Mellon University
- Occupations: Actor; Sculptor
- Years active: 1957–2015
- Height: 6 ft 4 in (193 cm)
- Spouses: Paulette Rochelle-Levy; Heidi Rorick Evans (m. 2015)
- Children: 2 (with Heidi)

Terrence Howard Evans (June 21, 1934 – August 7, 2015) was an American film and stage actor. His parents met on the RMS Berengaria while coming to America from Britain in 1929.

== Career ==
Between 1957 and 1965, Evans worked on stages all over the United States performing in repertory theatre. In 1965, he first came to Los Angeles to appear in the television series Gunsmoke. Since then he has appeared in numerous television and movie roles.

Evans appeared in both Star Trek: Deep Space Nine and Star Trek: Voyager. His first appearance in Deep Space Nine was in the first-season episode "Progress", in which he played the mute farmhand Baltrim. Later he appeared in the episode "Cardassians" as Proka Migdal, the adoptive father of a Cardassian boy.

In 1991, Evans appeared in Terminator 2: Judgment Day in the role of the driver of the tanker that is killed by the T-1000. In 1997, Evans played Ambassador Treen in the Voyager episode "Nemesis". He also played Leatherface's uncle Old Monty from 2003 remake of The Texas Chainsaw Massacre as well as its prequel, The Texas Chainsaw Massacre: The Beginning. His last role was as Uncle Edgar in the 2015 released Indie Comedy Horror film Bigfoot the Movie.

== Personal life ==
Evans had two daughters, Willow Lynne Evans and Michelle Evans Greene, with his first wife Paulette Rochelle-Levy. His second marriage was to Heidi Rorick Evans. He had one grandson, Zachary Mcmillan.

== Death ==
Evans died on August 7, 2015, in Burbank, California.

== Filmography ==
Film
| Year | Title | Role | Notes |
|---|---|---|---|
| 1970 | The Young Country | Postmaster | TV movie |
| 1977 | Cody | Semore | |
| 1980 | Falling in Love Again | Beaver | |
| 1985 | Fletch | Man with Shotgun | |
| 1985 | Pale Rider | Jake Henderson | |
| 1986 | There Must Be a Pony | Craft Services Man | TV movie |
| 1987 | Kenny Rogers as The Gambler, Part III: The Legend Continues | Lucas | TV movie |
| 1987 | American Harvest | Emil Schutzel | TV movie |
| 1987 | Born in East L.A. | Immigration Officer | |
| 1988 | Perry Mason: The Case of the Lady in the Lake | Sheriff Ed Prine | TV movie |
| 1989 | The Bite | Farmer Dave | |
| 1989 | Phantom of the Mall: Eric's Revenge | Security Guard | |
| 1989 | Trapper County War | Billy Luddigger | |
| 1989 | Caddie Woodlawn | Max Skeel | |
| 1990 | Welcome Home, Roxy Carmichael | Man at Legion Hall | |
| 1991 | Terminator 2: Judgment Day | Tanker Truck Driver | |
| 1993 | What's Love Got to Do with It | Bus Driver | |
| 1994 | Alien Nation: Dark Horizon | Rancher | TV movie |
| 1997 | The Last Embrace | Mustard Mike | |
| 1997 | Madam Savant | Detective 1 | |
| 1997 | A Guy Walks Into a Bar | Rattlesnake Dave | Short film |
| 1999 | Thick as Thieves | Bus Driver | |
| 1999 | The Runner | Lefty | |
| 1999 | 24-Seven | Hick | Short film |
| 2000 | Another Woman's Husband | Earl | TV movie |
| 2000 | Crocodile | Shurkin | |
| 2000 | The Silencing | Harry | Short film |
| 2001 | Note come due | Nestro | Short film |
| 2002 | The Oldest Rivalry in the West | Jenkins Gizmo | Short film written and directed by daughter Willow Lynne Evans |
| 2003 | The Texas Chainsaw Massacre | Old Monty | |
| 2005 | Down in the Valley | Director | |
| 2005 | Blockbusters | Doc | Short film |
| 2006 | Last Rites | Preacher | |
| 2006 | The Texas Chainsaw Massacre: The Beginning | Monty | |
| 2006 | The Pumpkin Karver | Ben Wickets | |
| 2006 | Mr. Fix It | Charlie | |
| 2007 | Alexander: Hero of Heroes | Aristotle | |
| 2007 | Blind Spot | Murphy Sullivan | Short film |
| 2008 | Driver's Ed | Hitchhiker | Short film |
| 2009 | Boppin' at the Glue Factory | Nick Frosco | |
| 2010 | Chain Letter | Mr. Bradford | |
| 2015 | Bigfoot the Movie | Uncle Edgar | |
| 2015 | War Room | War Room Soldier | |

Television
| Year | Title | Role | Notes |
|---|---|---|---|
| 1979 | Hart to Hart | Poet | Episode: "Hit Jennifer Hart" |
| 1980 | The Incredible Hulk | Cecil | Episode: "Sideshow" |
| 1980 | Little House on the Prairie | Horace Choate | Episode: "The In-laws" |
| 1981 | Quincy M.E. | Russell Lujack | Episode: "Who Speaks for the Children" |
| 1982 | The Greatest American Hero | Watchman | Episode: "The Hand-Painted Thai" |
| 1982 | Voyagers! | Ben | Episode: "Merry Christmas, Bogg" |
| 1984 | The Dukes of Hazzard | Jeb | Episode: "Welcome, Waylon Jennings" |
| 1984 | The A-Team | Fireman | Episode: "Fire" |
| 1986 | Dream West | Farmer | |
| 1987 | Nutcracker: Money, Madness & Murder | Doug Steele | |
| 1987 | Hill Street Blues | Nathan Schecter | Episode: "Days of Swine and Roses" |
| 1987 | Walt Disney's Wonderful World of Color | Mechanic | Episode: "Bride of Boogedy" |
| 1988 | The Golden Girls | Police Officer | Episode: "Mother's Day" |
| 1988 | Monsters | Mr. Rizten | Episode: "Rouse Him Not" |
| 1989 | Guns of Paradise | Richie Rolleri | Episode: "The Traveler" |
| 1989 | Hard Time on Planet Earth | Guard | Episode: "Stranger in a Strange Land" |
| 1990 | Falcon Crest | Clerk | Episode: "Time Bomb" |
| 1990 | Quantum Leap | Stick | Episode: "Another Mother" |
| 1991 | The New Adam-12 | Homeless Man | Episode: "Panic in Alverez Park" |
| 1993 | Star Trek: Deep Space Nine | Baltrim; Proka | Episode: "Progress"; Episode: "Cardassians" |
| 1995 | The Fresh Prince of Bel-Air | Trucker | Episode: "Burnin' Down the House" |
| 1996 | Renegade | Sergeant Arias | Episode: "No Balls, Two Strikes" |
| 1996 | Dark Skies | Clark Balfour | Episode: "Hostile Convergence" |
| 1997 | Star Trek: Voyager | Ambassador Treen | Episode: "Nemesis" |
| 1998 | ER | Barry Mahoney | Episode: "Day for Knight" |
| 2004 | Cold Case | Lester Hughes | Episode: "Daniela" |
| 2007 | Las Vegas | Scrooge | Episode: "A Cannon Carol" |
