= The Time Is Now (Millennium) =

- Millennium episode
- Episode no.: Season 2 Episode 23
- Directed by: Thomas J. Wright
- Written by: Glen Morgan; James Wong
- Production code: 5C23
- Original air date: May 15, 1998

Guest appearances
- Stephen Macht as Mr. Lott; Glenn Morshower as Richard Gilbert; Kristen Cloke as Lara Means; Daryl Shuttleworth as Brian Dixon; David Palffy as Dr. Sorenson; Hiro Kanagawa as Team Member Lewis

Episode chronology
← Previous "The Fourth Horseman"	Next → "The Innocents"
- Millennium season 2

"'The Time Is Now" is the twenty-third episode of the second season of the American crime-thriller television series Millennium. It premiered on the Fox network on May 15, 1998. The episode was written by Glen Morgan and James Wong, and directed by Thomas J. Wright. "The Time Is Now" featured guest appearances by Kristen Cloke and Glenn Morshower.

In this episode, Millennium Group profiler Frank Black (Lance Henriksen) confronts the onset of an apocalyptic viral outbreak, dealing with the duplicity of the Group's foreknowledge of, and preparation for, such an event.

The episode's script went through several variations, taking shape after series creator Chris Carter suggested killing off the character of Catherine Black (Megan Gallagher). The episode has earned positive responses from critics, and was seen by approximately 4.8 million households during its initial broadcast.

== Plot ==
Continuing from the preceding episode, several Millennium Group members in hazmat suits sanitize and clear out a house in El Cajon, California, where a family succumbed to the viral outbreak; outside, dozens of dead birds litter the ground.

Group member Frank Black (Lance Henriksen) returns to his former home with his wife Catherine (Megan Gallagher) and daughter Jordan (Brittany Tiplady). He realizes the house holds painful memories and decides to move away; the mail contains a deed from his late father, who had left him a cabin in the woods. However, Black decides to remain with the Group, despite his belief they are dangerous, feeling a responsibility to utilize their resources and ability to predict future events for good; Catherine, though understanding, is upset.

Later, Black meets with Richard Gilbert (Glenn Morshower), who is trying to convince him to join his private security firm, The Trust. Despite accepting his offer previously, Black now declines. Gilbert warns him their lives may be threatened by the Group's activities. After he leaves, several Group members appear, telling Black they are focused more on humanity as a collective than saving the lives of individual people. The next day, Black learns that Gilbert has died in a car accident; although he believes the vehicle was tampered with, there is no evidence.

Peter Watts (Terry O'Quinn) tells Black that he broke into the Group network after being locked out. He recovered information about the virus, which was discovered by Soviet bio-weapons scientists and has been living dormant in bird species since the end of the Cold War; it may now be making a resurgence in the U.S. after a previous minor outbreak in 1986. Watts reveals that a vaccine has been developed by the Group, but only in sufficient quantities for its members. Watts and Black were unknowingly vaccinated while in quarantine after coming in contact with an infected corpse. Black asks Watts to locate Lara Means (Kristen Cloke), another Group member, as he is concerned by several rambling phone messages he's received from her.

Watts arrives at the motel where Means is sequestered but is attacked by other Group members and barely manages to escape, losing his cell phone in the process. Inside, Means is experiencing a prolonged and frightening hallucination as a result of her induction into the Group. She trashes the room and briefly considers suicide while sealing something in an envelope. Black, tracing Watts' phone, locates the motel, but when he enters Means' room she hallucinates that he is a demon and tries to shoot him. He wrestles the gun away and paramedics who have accompanied him sedate her. Black discovers the envelope has his name on it and, visiting Means in an asylum, thanks her for being the only one who could truly understand his psychic powers and sympathize with him.

Black takes his family to the cabin, where he and Catherine discuss how they would handle infection. Catherine asks to be euthanized, while Black states he would wander off into the woods, thus sparing his family the sight of his death. He reveals that Means's envelope contains a single syringe loaded with the vaccine; Catherine immediately insists it be given to Jordan. Later, Catherine wakes up, experiencing symptoms of the virus. She quietly leaves the cabin and walks into the forest. The next morning, Black notices blood on Catherine's pillow and realizes what has happened. When Jordan awakens she finds her father comatose, his hair turned pure white. He cradles her listlessly as flashes of video noise are seen, interspersed with radio transmissions depicting the collapse of society.

== Production ==
"The Time Is Now" was written by frequent collaborators Glen Morgan and James Wong. The duo would pen a total of fifteen episodes throughout the series' run. The pair had also taken the roles of co-executive producers for the season. "The Time Is Now" was directed by Thomas J. Wright, who helmed a total of twenty-six episodes across all three seasons. Wright would also go on to direct "Millennium", the series' crossover episode with its sister show The X-Files.

The episode's script went through several different versions before a final plot was decided upon, as Morgan and Wong believed the series would not be renewed for a third season and wished to write a suitable ending. The decision to kill off the character of Catherine Black was based on a suggestion by Chris Carter, the series' creator. Morgan and Wong discussed the idea with actress Megan Gallagher, who felt that it was an interesting decision to have Catherine give her life after seeing Frank Black sacrifice so much for their family throughout the previous episodes. The idea of depicting an apocalyptic scenario as being the result of a virus came from Morgan's research into possible end-of-the-world scenarios, and was influenced by the outbreak of bovine spongiform encephalopathy in the United Kingdom.

== Broadcast and reception ==
"The Time Is Now" was first broadcast on the Fox network on May 15, 1998. The episode earned a Nielsen rating of 4.9 during its original broadcast, meaning that 4.9 percent of households in the United States viewed the episode. This represented approximately 4.8 million households, and left the episode the seventy-second most-viewed broadcast that week. (Note: Each ratings point represented 980,000 households during the 1997–98 television season.)

"The Time Is Now" received positive reviews from critics. The A.V. Club's Emily VanDerWerff rated the episode—along with the preceding episode "The Fourth Horseman—an "A". VanDerWerff felt that it "may be one of the four or five best cinematic depictions of the end of the world ever filmed", praising the uncommon approach of depicting the world ending, rather than just showing the aftermath. Bill Gibron, writing for DVD Talk, rated the episode 5 out of 5. Gibron felt that the two-part episodes were "a one-two punch that many dramatic series would die for", finding the conclusion to have been effectively hinted at throughout the season. Robert Shearman and Lars Pearson, in their book Wanting to Believe: A Critical Guide to The X-Files, Millennium & The Lone Gunmen, rated "The Time Is Now" five stars out of five. Shearman felt that the episode would have been "the best end to the show imaginable", had the series not produced a third season. He considered the episode's writing and conclusion to have been a brave decision, potentially alienating its viewers but producing "a thrilling and unforgettable piece of television"; he also considered the season as a whole to be less consistent but more daring than the first season.

== Footnotes ==
=== References ===
- Shearman, Robert; Pearson, Lars (2009). Wanting to Believe: A Critical Guide to The X-Files, Millennium & The Lone Gunmen. Mad Norwegian Press. ISBN 978-0975944691.
