= Melora (Star Trek: Deep Space Nine) =

- Star Trek: Deep Space Nine episode
- Episode no.: Season 2 Episode 6
- Directed by: Winrich Kolbe
- Story by: Evan Carlos Somers
- Teleplay by: Evan Carlos Somers; Steven Baum; Michael Piller; James Crocker
- Cinematography by: Marvin V. Rush
- Production code: 426
- Original air date: November 1, 1993

Guest appearances
- Daphne Ashbrook as Melora Pazlar; Peter Crombie as Fallit Kot; Don Stark as Ashrock; Ron Taylor as Klingon Chef

Episode chronology
← Previous "Cardassians"	Next → "Rules of Acquisition"
- Star Trek: Deep Space Nine season 2

"Melora" is the 26th episode of the American syndicated science fiction television series Star Trek: Deep Space Nine, the sixth episode of the second season.

Set in the 24th century, the series follows the adventures on Deep Space Nine, a space station located adjacent to a stable wormhole between the Alpha and Gamma quadrants of the Milky Way Galaxy, near the planet Bajor. In this episode, a young officer from a low-gravity planet is assigned to DS9; Dr. Julian Bashir assists her in adapting to the station's normal gravity.

== Plot ==
Starfleet officer Melora Pazlar (Daphne Ashbrook), an Elaysian whose species' physiology is incompatible with the strength of artificial gravity used in most humanoid communities, including Deep Space Nine, arrives on the station. She must use external mechanical apparatus to exist comfortably on the station. Because of her physical condition, Melora is argumentative, even rude, in insisting that she not be shown any undue accommodation. Nevertheless, Dr. Bashir (Alexander Siddig) sees through Melora's barriers and the two become romantically involved. Meanwhile, just as Quark (Armin Shimerman) is about to conclude a deal over some historical relics with a man named Ashrock (Don Stark), Fallit Kot (Peter Crombie) walks into his bar. The two have history, with Kot declaring to Quark that he is on DS9 to settle certain "debts". However, when questioned by Security Chief Odo (René Auberjonois), Kot denies any ill intentions toward the Ferengi.

Bashir develops a medical procedure that could allow Melora to comfortably walk without the help of any of the equipment she currently uses. Even after successfully participating in tests of Bashir's new engineering technique, Melora has misgivings. If she goes through with the procedure, she will no longer be able to live in the low-gravity environment of her home world. Lt. Jadzia Dax (Terry Farrell), during a survey mission with Melora to the Gamma Quadrant, compares her predicament to that of "The Little Mermaid". Kot attacks Quark in his quarters, but Quark offers him 199 bars of gold-pressed latinum in exchange for his life. Kot takes the deal, and they go to meet Ashrock at an airlock. Quark's deal is closed, but Kot shoots Ashrock and takes the relics in addition to the latinum. Kot forces the Ferengi to go with him, and they come across Melora and Dax, who are returning from their survey. Kot takes all three hostage aboard the runabout Orinoco.

Commander Benjamin Sisko (Avery Brooks) orders the runabout to be held in a tractor beam. Kot demands they be released, shooting Melora to prove his point. Sisko lets them go, but takes Bashir and Chief Miles O'Brien (Colm Meaney) with him in the runabout Rio Grande. They pursue Orinoco through the Bajoran wormhole. Kot orders Dax to fire on the Rio Grande but as she refuses, she notices that Melora is not only still alive, but crawling toward a console controlling the ship's gravity. In her element after shutting down the gravity, Melora overpowers Kot, who is taken into custody. After finally deciding against going through with Julian's procedure, Melora and Julian enjoy the Klingon chef's (Ron Taylor) serenade at the restaurant where they had their first date.

== Reception ==
Zach Handlen of The A.V. Club called the episode "a mediocre slog weighed down by an irritating guest star and some cheesy, grating romance." Although not the worst episode, he complained that it was "annoying in a boring way". Keith R. A. DeCandido of Tor.com gave it three out of ten.

== Releases ==
"Cardassians" and "Melora" were released together on one VHS tape, Star Trek: Deep Space Nine Vol. 13 - Cardassians/Melora.

It was released on LaserDisc in Japan on June 6, 1997 as part of the half season collection 2nd Season Vol. 1, which had 7 doubled sided 12" discs. The discs had English and Japanese audio tracks.

On April 1, 2003 Season 2 of Star Trek: Deep Space Nine was released on DVD video discs, with 26 episodes on seven discs.

This episode was released in 2017 on DVD with the complete series box set, which had 176 episodes on 48 discs.
