= Peter Crombie =

American actor (1952–2024)

- Crombie as "Crazy" Joe Davola in a 1992 Seinfeld episode.
- Born: Peter B. Crombie III; June 26, 1952; Chicago, Illinois, U.S.
- Died: January 10, 2024 (aged 71); Palm Springs, California, U.S.
- Occupation: Actor
- Years active: 1987–2000
- Notable work: Seinfeld
- Height: 6 ft 2 in (188 cm)
- Spouse: Nadine Kijner (m. 1991; div. 1997)

Peter B. Crombie III (June 26, 1952 – January 10, 2024) was an American film and television actor.

== Early life and education ==
Crombie was born Peter B. Crombie III on June 26, 1952 to Virginia (née Taborsky; 1916–1999) and Peter B. Crombie Jr. (1923–2002), and raised in Oak Lawn, a suburb of Chicago. He has one brother named Jim. He studied acting at the Yale School of Drama before moving to New York City.

== Career ==
Crombie appeared in such films as Born on the Fourth of July, Natural Born Killers, Seven, My Dog Skip and The Doors. His best-known television role was as the recurring minor character "Crazy" Joe Davola on Seinfeld. The name was used with the consent of Fox TV executive, Joe "Lennard" Davola.

Crombie also made guest appearances on such television series as Spenser: For Hire, Star Trek: Deep Space Nine (in the episode "Melora"), Walker, Texas Ranger, Law & Order, Picket Fences, NYPD Blue, Perfect Strangers and many others. Crombie wrote the script for the 2006 short drama Threshold.

== Personal life and death ==
Crombie married Nadine Kijner in 1991 and the couple divorced in 1997.

Crombie died after a brief illness on January 10, 2024, at the age of 71.

== Filmography ==
=== Film ===
Year	Title	Role	Notes
1988	The Blob	Soldier at Command Post	
1989	Born on the Fourth of July	Undercover Vet	
1990	Desperate Hours	Connelly	
1990	Smoothtalker	Jack Perdue	
1991	The Doors	Associate Lawyer	
1993	Rising Sun	Greg	
1994	Natural Born Killers	Intense Cop	
1995	Safe	Dr. Reynolds	
1995	Seven	Dr. O'Neill	
2000	My Dog Skip	Junior Smalls	

=== Television ===
Year	Title	Role	Notes
1987	Broken Vows	Dan Phelan	Television film
1987	Loving	Alan Howard #2	Episode #1.1096
1987	Leg Work	Haddix	Episode: "Pilot"
1988	Spenser: For Hire	Solomon Trench	Episode: "Arthur's Wake"
1988	Perfect Strangers	Mr. Jones	Episode: "The Graduate"
1988	American Playhouse	Bernhard Goetz	Episode: "The Trial of Bernhard Goetz"
1989	As the World Turns	Gage	Episode dated 29 December 1989
1990	H.E.L.P.	Mr. Perry	Episode: "Fire Down Below"
1991	Law & Order	Howie Neffer	Episode: "Confession"
1992–1993	Seinfeld	Crazy Joe Davola	5 episodes
1993	Star Trek: Deep Space Nine	Fallit Kot	Episode: "Melora"
1993	The John Larroquette Show	Ted Slattery	Episode: "There's a Mister Hitler Here to See You"
1994	Diagnosis: Murder	Brother Charles Simmons	Episode: "Lily"
1994	L.A. Law	Julius Watson	Episode: "Dead Issue"
1995	Get Smart	Larz	Episode: "Pilot"
1996	Grace Under Fire	Counterman	Episode: "Take Me to Your Breeder"
1996	Picket Fences	Agent Wesley Banes	Episode: "Forget Selma"
1996	L.A. Firefighters	Norman Minter	5 episodes
1997	A Walton Easter	Calvin Weeks	Television film
1997	House of Frankenstein	Frankenstein's Creature	2 episodes
1998	NYPD Blue	Carney	Episode: "Honeymoon at Viagra Falls"
2000	Walker, Texas Ranger	Detective Moody	Episode: "Deadly Situation"
