= Broken Vows (1987 film) =

- Print advertisement
- Genre: Drama; Mystery; Thriller; Romance
- Based on: Broken Vows by Dorothy Salisbury Davis
- Written by: Ivan Davis
- Directed by: Jud Taylor
- Starring: Tommy Lee Jones
- Theme music composer: Charles Gross
- Country of origin: United States
- Original language: English

Production
- Executive producers: Robert C. Thompson; Peter Zinner
- Producers: Bill Brademan; Pieter Kroonenburg; Edwin Self
- Production location: Montreal
- Cinematography: Thomas Burstyn
- Editors: Norman Gay; Peter Zinner
- Running time: 95 minutes
- Production companies: Brademan Self Productions; RHI Entertainment

Original release
- Network: CBS
- Release: January 28, 1987

Broken Vows is a 1987 television film directed by Jud Taylor. It stars Tommy Lee Jones and Annette O'Toole.

== Plot ==
Peter McMahon, a priest, is summoned to a deprived neighborhood to give a stabbing victim the last rites. Fr. McMahon soon gets entangled in friendship with the dead man's girlfriend, Nim, as they collectively attempt to solve the murder. McMahon faces a battle in his commitment to the church and whether his involvement still represents his commitment to his faith.

== Cast ==
- Tommy Lee Jones as Reverend Peter Joseph McMahon
- Annette O'Toole as Nana Marie "Nim" Fitzpatrick
- M. Emmet Walsh as Detective Mulligan
- Milo O'Shea as Monsignor Casey
- David Groh as Michael Drumm
- Madeleine Sherwood as Mrs. Chase
- Jean De Baer as Gene Drumm
- David Strathairn as Stuart Chase
- Frances Fisher as Maureen Phelan
- Peter Crombie as Dan Phelan

== Production ==
The script is based on the novel Where the Dark Streets Go by Dorothy Salisbury Davis.

== Reception ==
Mike Duffy from the Detroit Free Press praised the movie as "an impressive cut above the average TV movie," describing it as an "arresting drama" and giving it 3 stars, believing that it was a lot better than how it was portrayed in commercials. Faye B. Zuckerman, writing for The Manhattan Mercury considered the movie "noteworthy," praising O'Toole's "sensitive portrayal" of the victim's girlfriend but reserved the most recognition for the "notable performance" of Walsh, whom she described as "multitalented." Michael Hill from The Evening Sun had a mixed view on the movie, describing it as being "as interesting as it is confusing," while praising the "excellent" O'Toole in her portrayal of a free-spirited artist; he gave the film 3 stars after describing the conclusion as "oblique."
