= House of Frankenstein (miniseries) =

1997 television miniseries directed by Peter Werner

- Written by: J. B. White
- Directed by: Peter Werner
- Starring: Adrian Pasdar; Greg Wise; Teri Polo; C. C. H. Pounder; Peter Crombie
- Music by: Don Davis
- Country of origin: United States
- Original language: English

Production
- Producer: Michael R. Joyce
- Cinematography: Neil Roach
- Editors: Tod Feuerman; Scot J. Kelly
- Running time: 168 minutes
- Production company: Universal Television Entertainment

Original release
- Network: NBC
- Release: November 2 – November 3, 1997

House of Frankenstein is a 1997 television miniseries that revived Universal's threesome, the vampire, Frankenstein's monster and the werewolf. It starred Adrian Pasdar, C. C. H. Pounder, Greg Wise, Teri Polo and Peter Crombie. It first aired on NBC in two parts on November 2 and November 3, 1997.

== Characters ==
- Adrian Pasdar as Vernon Coyle, a police detective trying to solve a series of murders
- Greg Wise as Crispian Grimes, a Dracula-like vampire
- Teri Polo as Grace Dawkins, a newly bitten werewolf
- C. C. H. Pounder as Dr. Shauna Kendall
- Peter Crombie as Frankenstein's monster
- Miguel Sandoval as Detective Juan 'Cha Cha' Chacon
- Jorja Fox as Felicity, Grace's friend
- Richard Libertini as Armando
- Karen Austin as Irene Lassiter

== Production ==
Shooting began during June 1997 in Los Angeles, California.

== Reception ==
Entertainment Weekly called it a "two-part silly dilly of a horror film" that "wobbles as badly as the vampire’s rubbery pointed ears." Variety said "Cliches pile up appallingly, familiar situations sneak in out of other would-be monster pics." The New York Times bluntly called it "Not scary" and claimed it ineptly borrowed from other films.
