= East of Hope Street =

- Directed by: Nate Thomas
- Written by: Tim Russ; Nate Thomas
- Produced by: Tim Russ; Nate Thomas
- Starring: Jude Herrera; Tim Russ; Roxanne Coyne; Magda Rivera
- Cinematography: Mark Woods
- Edited by: Robert Davenport II
- Music by: Jonathan Merrill
- Production companies: Nate Thomas & Associates
- Distributed by: The Cinema Guild
- Release date: November 5, 1999
- Running time: 88 minutes
- Country: United States
- Language: English

East of Hope Street is a 1998 award-winning film drama directed and produced by Nate Thomas. It was executive produced by Tim Russ (best known for his role as Lieutenant Commander Tuvok on the Star Trek: Voyager television series) who also stars in the film. East of Hope Street had a limited release in theaters beginning on November 5, 1999 by The Cinema Guild. It had a home video street date on September 21, 2004. The gritty, urban, fact-based story is loosely based on director Nate Thomas's 10 years of experience working as a counselor in a group home for pregnant teens in Los Angeles. Russ plays a role autobiographical of Thomas. The film has been called "timely and provocative" by the Los Angeles Daily News, "an emotional and powerful film" by KCOP-TV, "stark and unflinching" by Backstage, and "a testament to the human spirit" by The Austin Chronicle.

== Plot ==
East of Hope Street tells the real-life coming of age story of Alicia Montalvo, a teenage Salvadoran refugee caught up in the labyrinthine Los Angeles child protection system. Alicia struggles to survive the abuses of home, the inner city, and an overburdened social system in a Los Angeles most people never see.

== Featured cast ==
- Jude Herrera (as Jade Herrera).... Alicia
- Tim Russ.... Casey
- Magda Rivera.... Rosa
- Eve Rivera....Carmen
- Greer Bohanon.... Tameeka
- Asanio Lara.... Carlos
- Roxanne Coyne.... Bianca
- Fabiana Medici....
- Ranjani Brow.... Missy
- Pete Panos.... Luis
- Susanne McKenrick.... Mrs. Robertson
- Daniel Chace.... Mr. Robertson
- Joyce Rae.... Louise Carrington
- Sebastian Cetina.... Mario
- Barbara Jones.... Judge Francis Albee
- Rafael H Robledo....Mr. Valez

=== Awards and nominations ===
- Best Feature Film (New Orleans Urban Film Festival 1998)
- Best Actor Award (Jude Herrera) (New Orleans Urban Film Festival 1998)
- Best Urban Drama (New York International Independent Film Festival 1998)
- 1st Place Cross Cultural (Black Filmmakers Hall of Fame Festival 1998)
- Jury Award (Hollywood Black Film Festival 1999)
- Best Feature Film nomination (Imagen Foundation 2000)
- Outstanding Performance by an Actress in a Film (Jude Herrera) (FAITA Awards 2000)
