= Cardassians (Star Trek: Deep Space Nine episode) =

- Star Trek: Deep Space Nine episode
- Episode no.: Season 2 Episode 5
- Directed by: Cliff Bole
- Story by: Gene Wolande; John Wright
- Teleplay by: James Crocker
- Production code: 425
- Original air date: October 25, 1993

Guest appearances
- Andrew Robinson as Elim Garak; Rosalind Chao as Keiko O'Brien; Marc Alaimo as Gul Dukat; Robert Mandan as Kotan Pa'Dar; Terrence Evans as Proka; Vidal Peterson as Rugal; Dion Anderson as Zolan; Sharon Conley as Jomat Luson; Karen Hensel as Deela; Jillian Ziesmer as Asha

Episode chronology
← Previous "Invasive Procedures"	Next → "Melora"
- Star Trek: Deep Space Nine season 2

"Cardassians" is the 25th episode of the American science fiction television series Star Trek: Deep Space Nine. It is the fifth episode of the second season.

Set in the 24th century, the series follows the adventures on Deep Space Nine, a space station located near the planet Bajor, as the Bajorans recover from a brutal, decades-long occupation by the imperialistic Cardassians. In this episode, Cardassian ex-spy Garak and Dr. Julian Bashir investigate the identity of a Cardassian boy raised by Bajoran parents.

== Plot ==
When Garak sees a Cardassian boy on Deep Space Nine, he decides to introduce himself, but the boy, Rugal, bites him on the hand. The boy has been raised by Bajoran parents and taught to hate and fear Cardassians. His adoptive parents claim that they do not consider him a Cardassian any more, but allegations of abuse lead to an investigation into the family. Gul Dukat, the Cardassian officer who was the prefect of Bajor during the occupation, tells DS9's commander Benjamin Sisko that he is trying to bring orphaned Cardassians back from Bajor and that the discovery of Rugal will strengthen his case. Miles and Keiko O'Brien agree to care for Rugal during the investigation, and Rugal helps Miles overcome his prejudice against Cardassians.

Garak, suspecting (or perhaps knowing) that there is more to this series of events than meets the eye, persuades Bashir to request permission from Sisko to allow them to travel to Bajor and investigate. Sisko grants the request after Dukat informs him that Rugal is the son of a prominent Cardassian civilian politician, Kotan Pa'Dar. Garak and Bashir investigate records at an orphanage that took in Cardassian orphans when the occupation ended. Garak suggests that the situation is tied to a conflict between military and civilian interests on Cardassia: Pa'Dar is a political rival of Dukat, having cost Dukat his position as prefect by ordering the Cardassian withdrawal from Bajor.

Back on the station, Pa'Dar arrives to greet Rugal, but the boy does not remember him and calls Pa'Dar a "Cardassian butcher." Regardless of this, Pa'Dar wants his son back, but Rugal's adoptive father refuses to relinquish him.

A formal tribunal is established, headed by Sisko, who is seen to be a neutral arbiter. Dukat attends the ensuing hearing. Meanwhile, on Bajor, Garak and Bashir track down the woman who took Rugal in at the orphanage, who remembers that a Cardassian woman attached to Terok Nor (the Cardassian name for DS9) brought Rugal to her.

Bashir interrupts the hearing, alleging that Rugal's discovery was part of a conspiracy planned by Dukat all along: that Dukat ordered one of his subordinates to leave Rugal behind knowing that the boy would one day be found and that as a result Pa'Dar would be humiliated. The plot having been exposed, Dukat storms out of the room; Sisko awards custody of the boy to Pa'Dar, who reassures Sisko that Dukat will never reveal what happened now that he too has been humiliated. Later, Bashir and Garak sit down for lunch, and Bashir asks Garak for the truth about his history with Dukat. Garak smiles and tells him to notice the details, which he compares to crumbs scattered across the table.

== Releases ==
"Cardassians" and "Melora" were released together on one VHS tape, Star Trek: Deep Space Nine Vol. 13 – Cardassians/Melora.

It was released on LaserDisc in Japan on June 6, 1997, as part of the half season collection 2nd Season Vol. 1, which had 7 doubled sided 12" discs. The discs had English and Japanese audio tracks.

On April 1, 2003, Season 2 of Star Trek: Deep Space Nine was released on DVD video discs, with 26 episodes on seven discs.

This episode was released in 2017 on DVD with the complete series box set, which had 176 episodes on 48 discs.
