= Starship Mine =

- Star Trek: The Next Generation episode
- Episode no.: Season 6 Episode 18
- Directed by: Cliff Bole
- Written by: Morgan Gendel
- Cinematography by: Jonathan West
- Editing by: David Ramirez
- Production code: 244
- Original air date: March 29, 1993

Guest appearances
- David Spielberg – Cmdr. Calvin Hutchinson; Marie Marshall – Kelsey; Tim Russ – Devor; Glenn Morshower – Orton; Tom Nibley – Neil; Tim de Zarn – Satler; Patricia Tallman – Kiros; Arlee Reed – Arkanian Waiter; Alan Altshuld – Pomet; Majel Barrett – Computer Voice

Episode chronology
← Previous "Birthright"	Next → "Lessons"
- Star Trek: The Next Generation season 6

"Starship Mine" is the 144th episode of the American science fiction television series Star Trek: The Next Generation, the 18th episode of the sixth season. The episode marked an early appearance of actor Tim Russ in the Star Trek canon prior to his being cast as Tuvok on Star Trek: Voyager.

Set in the 24th century, the series follows the adventures of the Starfleet crew of the Federation starship Enterprise-D. In this episode, while the Enterprise is evacuated for hazardous maintenance, Captain Picard must, alone, contend with thieves posing as a work crew aboard the ship. The plot has been noted for its similarity to the 1988 action film Die Hard.

== Plot ==
The Federation starship Enterprise is docked at the Remmler Array to be decontaminated through the use of a baryon sweep, harmless to the inorganic materials of the ship but deadly to living beings. The ship is evacuated to the array's base and its systems shut down in preparation for the sweep. Captain Picard and the rest of the senior staff are invited by the base's commanding officer, Commander Calvin Hutchinson, to a cocktail party, but Picard foresees that he will be cornered by Hutchinson's "small talk" during the event. He returns to the Enterprise to retrieve his saddle to go riding instead, but on leaving finds an array technician working with the ship's panels. Picard tries to find out what the technician is doing, but he is attacked instead; Picard gains the upper hand and knocks the technician out.

Meanwhile, at the cocktail party, Enterprise Chief Engineer La Forge detects strange readings coming from one of the centerpieces with his VISOR. Before he can investigate, the other array staff members draw hidden weapons (the source of the readings) and take the partygoers hostage, injuring La Forge and killing Hutchinson. They prevent them from communicating with the rest of the crew or Starfleet while the sweep is initiated. The crew stealthily work to devise a plan to break free of their captors.

Aboard the Enterprise, Picard discovers that a small force of technicians, led by a woman named Kelsey, are aboard attempting to steal trilithium resin from the warp engines to sell to another group as part of a powerful explosive. He is captured but escapes. With the baryon sweep progressing forward through the ship, Picard plays a game of cat-and-mouse with the technicians while staying ahead. Eventually having neutralized all but Kelsey, Picard retreats to Ten-Forward, the last area that will be hit by the sweep. Kelsey manages to beam away to a waiting ship. Picard repeatedly hails the base to deactivate the baryon sweep. The Enterprise officers, having managed to overcome their captors by an elaborate ruse involving Geordi's VISOR, are able to stop the sweep just in time to save Picard's life. Data informs Picard of a shuttle trying to escape. Picard, having surreptitiously taken the control rod from the trilithium's storage container during his fight with Kelsey, states that they will not get far as the trilithium explodes, destroying the shuttle.

== Casting ==
Tim Russ, as the rogue technician Devor, made his first appearance in the Star Trek franchise in "Starship Mine". He had previously been an alternate choice for the part of Geordi La Forge at the start of the series, but LeVar Burton was chosen instead by Gene Roddenberry. Russ subsequently auditioned on multiple occasions for parts in episodes, and was again considered for a main role in Star Trek: Deep Space Nine. Following his appearance in "Starship Mine", he appeared as a Klingon in the Deep Space Nine episode "Invasive Procedures" and as an unnamed Ensign in the film Star Trek Generations, before landing the role of Tuvok on Star Trek: Voyager.

Patricia Tallman, playing Kiros in the episode, went on to portray key role Lyta Alexander in the competing science fiction series Babylon 5.

David Spielberg is cast as party-host Hutchinson.

== Reception ==
The episode has received positive reviews, with some commentators identifying it as one of the best episodes of the series overall, especially for new viewers. It has been repeatedly praised for its focus on Picard in dealing with a threat to his starship on his own, without the aid of his crew. Several writers recommended it as a good episode to watch before the Star Trek: Picard series featuring the character.

Tor.com praised David Spielberg's performance as Hutchinson, especially comedic scenes between Data (played by Brent Spiner) and Hutchinson. They also praised actress-stuntwoman Patricia Tallman for her performance as Kiros, a hostile technician. Overall they rated the episode six out of ten, noting not just the Picard action sequences, but also the many smaller lines of dialogue and details of the episode.

The plot of episode has been favorably likened to the 1988 action film Die Hard, with Games Radar calling it "Die Hard in a Jefferies Tube".

== Releases ==
The episode was released as part of the Star Trek: The Next Generation season six DVD box set in the United States on December 3, 2002. A remastered HD version was released on Blu-ray optical disc, on June 24, 2014.

An example of a broadcast television release was on April 4, 1993, when the episode aired at 5:30 PM, with the television guide noting that "Thieves posing as technicians trap Picard as lethal rays bombard the Enterprise."
