= Glenn Morshower =

American character actor (born 1959)

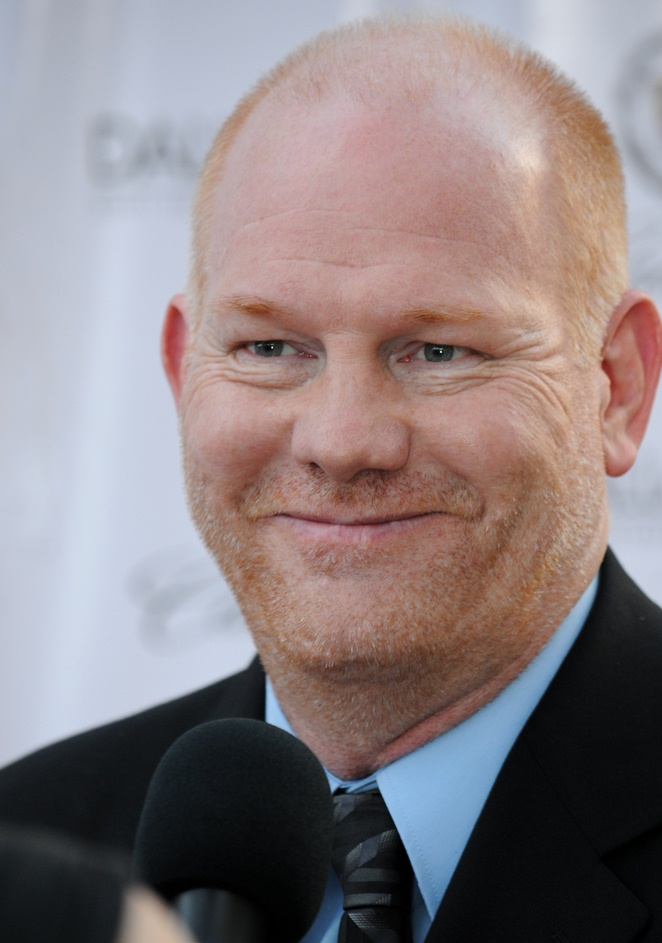
- Morshower in 2011
- Born: Glenn Grove Bennett; April 24, 1959 (age 67); Dallas, Texas, U.S.
- Occupation: Actor
- Years active: 1976–present
- Spouse: Carolyn Morshower
- Children: 2

Glenn Morshower (born April 24, 1959) is an American actor and an inspirational speaker. Known for his distinctive Texas accent, he is well known for playing military and law enforcement roles in both live-action and voice work, particularly Secret Service Agent Aaron Pierce in 24 and as an unnamed SOCCENT Sergeant in the first Transformers film; he returned in future Transformers films as a different character known as General Morshower. Aaron Pierce was the only character (other than Jack Bauer) to appear in each of the first seven seasons of 24. He has appeared in many feature films and television series.

== Early life and family ==
Morshower was born in Dallas, Texas, the son of Alan Jackson Bennett and Barbara Mae Bennett (née Phelps). He was raised Jewish, graduated from Hillcrest High School, and from the age of 12 acted at the Dallas Theater Center. The year after graduation from high school, in 1978 he married his high school sweetheart, Carolyn. He has studied the beliefs of Jehovah's Witness, attends a Religious Science church, and has taught at a Baptist church.

== Inspirational seminars ==
Since the late 1980s, Morshower has been a speaker at seminars. His speaking career began with his audition mastery course, The Extra Mile, which he took across the country on the advice of his agent. In the early 2000s, Morshower's speeches to actors about auditioning led to an invitation to speak at Exxon, and more seminars followed. Morshower prefers to describe his talk as "inspirational" rather than "motivational", and has said that he enjoys giving these speeches even more than acting.

== Personal life ==
Morshower and his wife Carolyn have two children.

== Filmography ==
=== Film ===
Glenn Morshower' film credits
Year	Title	Role	Notes	Ref(s)
1976	Drive-In	Orville Hennigson		
1978	The Bermuda Triangle	Gallivan	Documentary	
1981	Dead & Buried	Jimmy		
1984	The Philadelphia Experiment	Mechanic		
1988	Defense Play	Bartender		
1989	Tango & Cash	Co-Worker		
1989	84C MoPic	Cracker		
1992	Under Siege	Ensign Taylor		
1994	The River Wild	Policeman		
1994	Star Trek Generations	Enterprise-B navigator		
1994	In the Army Now	Recruiting Sergeant Richard Day		
1995	Dominion	Lance		
1997	Air Force One	United States Secret Service Agent Walters		
1998	Godzilla	Kyle Terrington		
1998	Phoenix	Anti-Abortionist		
2001	Pearl Harbor	Vice Admiral William F. Halsey		
2001	Black Hawk Down	Colonel Thomas Matthews		
2002	Blood Work	Captain		
2003	The Core	FBI Agent		
2003	Gacy	Ted Boyle		
2004	The Last Shot	Agent McCaffrey		
2005	Good Night, and Good Luck	Colonel Anderson		
2005	Hostage	Lt. Leifitz		
2005	Disaster!	General Washington / The President	Voice role	
2005	The Island	Medical Courier		
2006	Behind Enemy Lines II: Axis of Evil	Admr. Henry D. Wheeler	Direct-to-video	
2006	All the King's Men	Commissioner Sherman		
2006	Striking Range	Ted Billings		
2007	Transformers	Colonel Sharpe		
2007	Delta Farce	General		
2008	Grizzly Park	Ranger Bob		
2009	Transformers: Revenge of the Fallen	General Morshower		
2009	The Men Who Stare at Goats	Major Jim Holtz		
2009	ExTerminators	Boss		
2009	Desdemona: A Love Story	Father Wade		
2009	Fire from Below	General Cook		
2010	The Crazies	Intelligence Officer		
2010	The Waiter	Nigel Hamilton		
2010	Psychic Experiment	Mr. Anderson		
2011	X-Men: First Class	Colonel Robert Hendry		
2011	Transformers: Dark of the Moon	General Morshower		
2011	Moneyball	Ron Hopkins		
2011	In My Pocket	Professor Taples		
2011	The Legend of Hell's Gate: An American Conspiracy	J.H. Gordon		
2012	Backwards	Coach Spriklin		
2013	After Earth	Commander Velan		
2013	Parkland	Mike Howard		
2014	Flutter	Mark	Also producer	
2015	Dark Places	Jim Jeffreys		
2015	Hoovey	Dr. Kattner		
2015	The Doo Dah Man	Smitty		
2016	When the Bough Breaks	Martin Cooper		
2017	Transformers: The Last Knight	General Morshower		
2017	Aftermath	Matt		
2017	Curvature	Tomas		
2017	Bomb City	Cameron Wilson		
2019	Neon Days	Luke		
2023	Grumpy Old Santa	Nic		
2024	Dragpires	Regina	Post-production	

=== Television ===
Glenn Morshower' television credits
Year	Title	Role	Notes	Ref(s)
1989	Star Trek: The Next Generation	Burke	Episode: "Peak Performance"	
1990	The Court-Martial of Jackie Robinson	Capt. Spencer	Television film	
1991	Full House	Farmer Bob	Episode: "The Wedding: Part 2"	
1991	Quantum Leap	Grady	Episode: "Justice"	
1993	12:01	Detective Cryers	Television film	
1993	Star Trek: The Next Generation	Orton	Episode: "Starship Mine"	
1995	Star Trek: Voyager	Guard	Episode: "Resistance"	
1995–05	JAG	Chief Petty Officer Ned Bannon	Recurring role	
1998	The X-Files	Aaron Starkey	Episode: "All Souls"	
1998	Millennium	Richard Gilbert	Episode: "The Time Is Now"	
2000–01	CSI: Crime Scene Investigation	Sheriff Brian Mobley	Seasons 1&2, recurring role (7 episodes)	
2001–02	The West Wing	Mike Chysler	Recurring role (5 episodes)	
2002	Buffy the Vampire Slayer	Mr. Newton	Episode: "Help"	
2001–09	24	Aaron Pierce	Recurring role (52 episodes)	
2003	NCIS	Commander Robert Peters	Episode: "Sub Rosa"	
2003	Star Trek: Enterprise	Sheriff MacReady	Episode: "North Star" Season 3	
2003	The Commission	James J. Humes	TV film	
2004	ER	Rick Decoyte	Episode: "Intern's Guide to the Galaxy"	
2005	Charmed	Agent Keyes	Episode: "Still Charmed and Kicking"; Episode: "Something Wicca This Way Goes"	
2005	Monk	Martin Willowby	Episode: "Mr. Monk Gets Cabin Fever"	
2007–10	Friday Night Lights	Chad Clarke	Recurring role (10 episodes)	
2008	King of the Hill	Bud Ferguson	Episode: "Six Characters in Search of a House"	
2009	Criminal Minds	Lt. Kevin Mitchell	Episode: "Haunted"	
2010	Lie to Me	Col. Gorman	Episode: "Beat the Devil"	
2010	Army Wives	Detective Gibson	Episode: "Murder in Charleston"	
2012	Hawaii Five-0	Agent Kendricks	Episode: "Ua Hopu"	
2012–2014	Dallas	Lou Rosen	recurring cast seasons 1–3	
2013	Castle	Defense Secretary Michael Reed	Episode: "Dreamworld"	
2013	Dads	Officer Silverton	Episode: "Dad Abuse"	
2014	Agents of S.H.I.E.L.D.	General Jacobs	Episode: "Ragtag"; Episode: "Beginning of the End"	
2014	Law & Order: Special Victims Unit	Coach Bill Becker	Episode: "Gridiron Soldier"	
2015–16	Bloodline	Wayne Lowry	10 episodes	
2015	Scandal	Admiral Hawley	Episode: "A Few Good Women"	
2015–16	Supergirl	Sam Lane	Recurring role (5 episodes)	
2017	Preacher	Preacher Mike	Episode: "On the Road"	
2017	I'm Dying Up Here	Warren Hobbs	Recurring role (4 episodes)	
2017	Narcos	Senator Martin	Episode: "Follow the Money"	
2018	Philip K. Dick's Electric Dreams	Ed	Episode: "Kill All Others"	
2018–2022	The Resident	Marshall Winthrop	Recurring role (24 episodes)	
2019	Madam Secretary	General Arthur Hayes	Episode: "Carpe Diem"	
2022	Women of the Movement	Editor	Episode: "The Last Word"	
2022	Ozark	FBI Executive Assistant Director Graves	2 episodes	
2022	Panhandle	Sheriff Grant	Main cast (8 episodes)	
2024	Manhunt	Andrew Johnson	7 episodes	

=== Video games ===
Glenn Morshower' video game credits
Year	Title	Role	Notes
2006	24: The Game	Agent Aaron Pierce	Voice and likeness
2009	Call of Duty: Modern Warfare 2	Overlord	
2010	Singularity	Additional Voices	
2011	Battlefield 3	Agent Gordon	Voice and likeness
2012	Call of Duty: Black Ops II	FBI Announcer (Multiplayer)	
2017	Wolfenstein II: The New Colossus	Rip Blazkowicz	
2020	Call of Duty: Modern Warfare 2 Campaign Remastered	Overlord	
2022	Call of Duty: Modern Warfare II	General Herschel Shepherd	Voice and likeness
2023	Call of Duty: Modern Warfare III	General Herschel Shepherd	Voice and likeness
