= Invasive Procedures (Star Trek: Deep Space Nine) =

- Star Trek: Deep Space Nine episode
- Episode no.: Season 2 Episode 4
- Directed by: Les Landau
- Story by: John Whelpley
- Teleplay by: John Whelpley; Robert Hewitt Wolfe
- Cinematography by: Marvin Rush
- Production code: 424
- Original air date: October 18, 1993

Guest appearances
- John Glover as Verad; Megan Gallagher as Mareel; Tim Russ as T'Kar; Steven Rankin as Yeto

Episode chronology
← Previous "The Siege"	Next → "Cardassians"
- Star Trek: Deep Space Nine season 2

"Invasive Procedures" is the 24th episode of the American syndicated science fiction television series Star Trek: Deep Space Nine. It is the fourth episode of the second season.

Set in the 24th century, the series follows the adventures on Deep Space Nine, a space station located near a stable wormhole between the Alpha and Gamma quadrants of the Milky Way Galaxy, near the planet Bajor. This episode explores the Trill species, of which DS9 officer Jadzia Dax is a member: They are formed of a host and a symbiont, with the symbiont passed from host to host as the previous one dies. In this episode, a bitter unjoined Trill attempts to steal the Dax symbiont from Jadzia.

== Plot ==
During a plasma storm, Deep Space Nine is evacuated, with only a skeleton crew remaining behind to maintain the station until the event passes. Posing as a cargo transport in distress, an unjoined Trill, a pair of hired Klingon mercenaries, and a former prostitute named Mareel board the station and overpower the crew. Major Kira tries to take Mareel by surprise, but Mareel outfights her. The Trill, Verad, once applied to be joined with a symbiont and was rejected; now he wants the Dax symbiont. After restraining the shapeshifting Constable Odo in a container and taking the rest of the crew hostage, he forces Dr. Bashir to transfer the symbiont into his body. Without her symbiont, Jadzia will die within hours.

Bashir has one of the Klingons assist him as he tries to save Jadzia's life. Meanwhile, Commander Sisko deals with Verad, who now has the memories of all the Dax hosts, including Curzon Dax, who was a very close friend and mentor to Sisko. He implores Verad to set things right, but sees that he intends to let Jadzia die. Meanwhile, Mareel, whom Verad had befriended early in life, begins to realize how much the man has changed since he received the symbiont, and begins to think the joining may have been a bad idea. However, she remains loyal to him.

The bartender Quark, who helped Verad and his crew board the station by bypassing the security lockdown, pretends to be injured and thereby provides Bashir with the opportunity to sedate one of the Klingons. He then cracks the lock on the container holding Odo. Once Verad discovers what has happened, he heads for his ship, taking Kira as a hostage.

By the time Verad reaches his ship, Odo has released the docking clamps, leaving him stranded. Kira overpowers the Klingon who is holding her, but in the confusion Verad slips away, heading for another ship. In the meantime, Mareel now knows that the man she loves truly is gone and decides to help Sisko. Sisko confronts Verad at the airlock. Believing that Sisko will not shoot his old friend and risk damaging the recently joined symbiont, Verad begins to walk away, but Sisko stuns him with a phaser. The Dax symbiont is returned to Jadzia, leaving Verad alone once again.

== Casting ==
Tim Russ portrays the Klingon T'Kar in this episode; he also appeared in a similarly minor antagonistic role as Devor in the Star Trek: The Next Generation episode "Starship Mine", and would go on to portray one of the main crew members, the Vulcan Tuvok, in Star Trek: Voyager.

== Reception ==
In 2018, SyFy included this episode on their Jadzia Dax binge-watching guide.

== Releases ==
"The Siege" and "Invasive Procedures" were released on VHS together on one cassette tape (catalog number VHR 2719).

It was released on LaserDisc in Japan on June 6, 1997 as part of the half season collection 2nd Season Vol. 1, which had 7 doubled sided 12" discs. The discs had English and Japanese audio tracks.

On September 17, 1997, "The Siege" and "Invasive Procedures" were released on one LaserDisc in the United States. Released by Paramount Home Video, the 12 inch optical disc used both sides for a runtime of 92 minutes with the two shows.

On April 1, 2003 Season 2 of Star Trek: Deep Space Nine was released on DVD video discs, with 26 episodes on seven discs.

This episode was released in 2017 on DVD with the complete series box set, which had 176 episodes on 48 discs.
