= Ryan Dunlap =

American actor (born 1983)

Ryan Patrick Dunlap
- Born: October 21, 1983 (age 41); Tulsa, Oklahoma, U.S.
- Occupation(s): Director, Actor, Writer
- Spouse: Sarah Dunlap

Ryan Dunlap (born October 21, 1983) is an American independent film and short story actor, writer, and director. He is often recognised for his feature film, Greyscale.

== Life and career ==
=== Early life and career ===
Ryan Dunlap was born and raised in Tulsa, Oklahoma, where he studied film at the University of Tulsa.

According to Dunlap himself, he made his "directorial debut" at the age of four, having loved to fiddle with his parents' camcorder and filming his surrounding.

=== Film ===
After graduating from the University of Tulsa, he produced several short films such as Smugglin and Return to Volition before he wrote the film, Greyscale. His first feature film role was in Brian Shoop's Treasure Blind, playing the role of Alva Battlefield, one of three primary civil war thieves trying to steal a load of Confederate gold. After the role in Treasure Blind, he began to write Greyscale. Dunlap conceived the idea in May 2008, and shooting began in September 2008 and ended in April 2009. It was privately screened in Tulsa in late summer 2010. As of January 2011, he is based in Nashville, Tennessee. Dunlap was reported in January 2011 to have been creating a feature documentary for BrightBulb Entertainment.

He manages his own film production company, Daros Films, with his wife and two of his friends.

=== Writer ===
A member of the Tulsa NaNoWriMo group, Dunlap has written a book, entitled The Wind Merchant, to finance Greyscale. He reportedly wrote the book by hand, using a fountain pen and a leather-bound book. A sequel is in development.

In 2016, Dunlap entered JukePop and 1888 Center's Summer Writing Project 2016 and was selected the winner. His manuscript, The Goldfish was chosen for publication.

== Select filmography ==
=== Film ===
- Greyscale (2015; as Oliver Allen, also writer and director)

== Select works ==
=== Literary ===
- The Wind Merchant (2012)
- The Littlest Clockwork (2014)
- The Reclaimer (2014)
- The Goldfish (2016)
