= Walter O'Brien (disambiguation) =

Walter O'Brien (born 1975), is Irish businessman, information technologist, executive producer, and media personality.

Walter O'Brien may also refer to:

- Walter O'Brien (Scorpion), fictional character in the American drama television series Scorpion
- Walter A. O'Brien (1914–1998), Progressive Party politician
- Wally O'Brien (1907–1983), Australian rules footballer
