= Elyes Gabel =

English actor (born 1983)

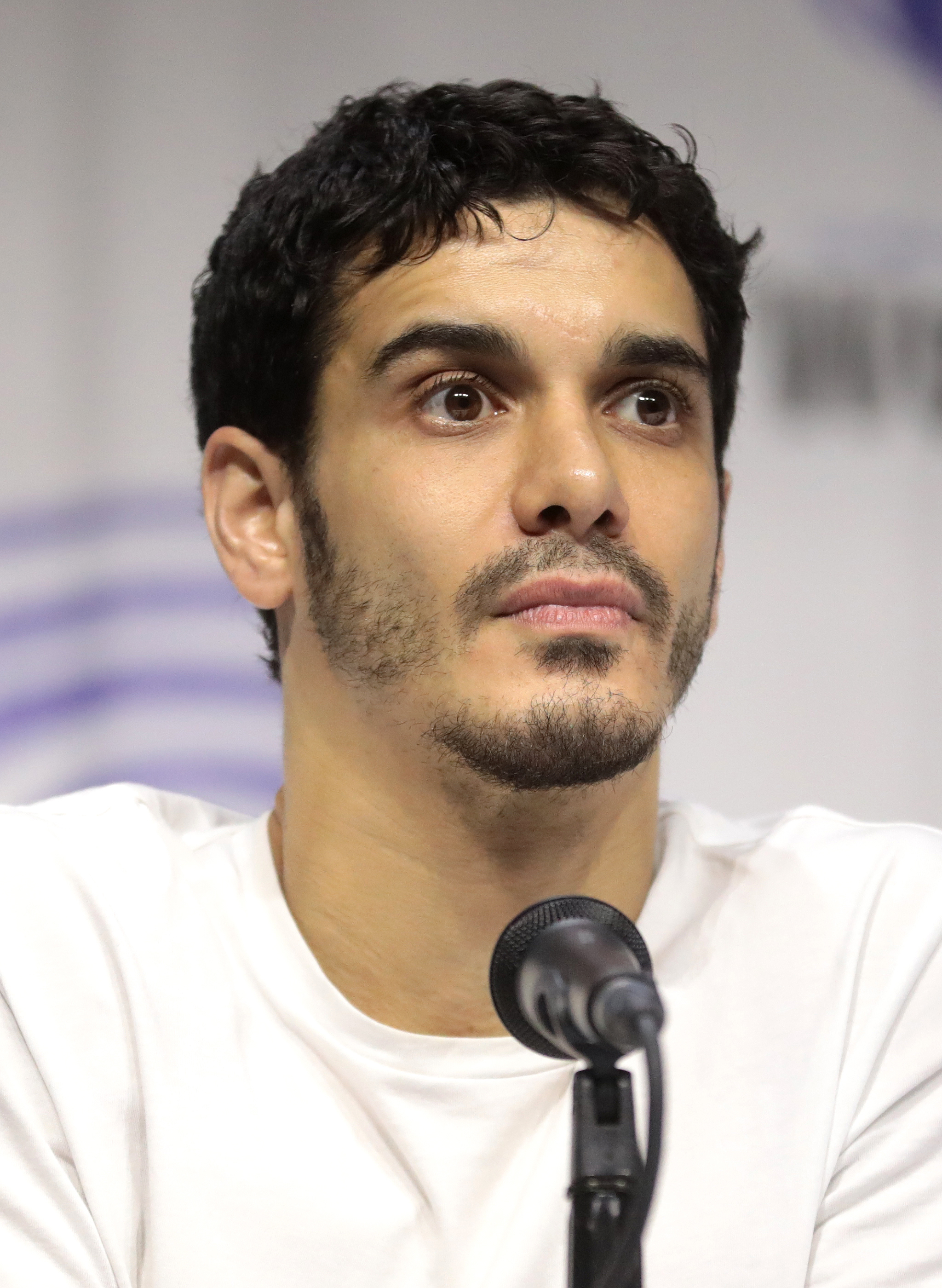
- Gabel at the 2019 WonderCon
- Born: Elyes Cherif Gabel; 8 May 1983 (age 43); Westminster, London, England
- Occupation: Actor
- Years active: 2001–present

Elyes Cherif Gabel (/ˈɛliəs ɡəˈbɛl/; born 8 May 1983) is a British actor. Gabel's global breakout role was portraying computer genius Walter O'Brien in the CBS series Scorpion (2014–2018). Earlier he gained recognition as series regular Dr. Gurpreet "Guppy" Sandhu in the BBC medical drama Casualty (2004–2007), as Dothraki Rakharo in seasons 1 and 2 of the HBO series Game of Thrones (2011–2012), as PE teacher Rob Cleaver in series 4 of BBC One's school-based drama series Waterloo Road (2009) and as DC Jose Rodriguez in the ITV drama Identity (2010).

In 2011, he appeared as Prince Djem in a guest-star-role in the 3-times Emmy awarded TV show The Borgias, and appeared later in 2011 as Shahrouz in the dark comedy Psychoville. He moved to the US and was starting to be cast in US TV shows, as series-regular Detective Adam Lucas in season 3 of Body of Proof (2013). In February 2022, Gabel starred as Sean Tilson in Apple TV's 8-part-thriller Suspicion. In 2024, he appeared as Hassan in the CBS series FBI episode "Creating a Monster".

His most notable film appearances are as virologist Andrew Fassbach in the post-apocalyptic thriller World War Z (2013), as Julian in J.C. Chandor's Golden Globe and Independent Spirit Award nominated crime drama A Most Violent Year (2014), and as Adem Qasim in the spy thriller Spooks: The Greater Good (2015). He voiced Thom Kallor/Star Boy in Justice League vs. the Fatal Five (2019).

== Early life ==
Gabel was born in Westminster and lived in Canada before returning to the UK to live in Bristol and Manchester. He is of French-Algerian, Anglo-Indian, Spanish, Dutch, Irish and Portuguese descent. He attended St Damian's Roman Catholic Science College in Ashton-Under-Lyne and later trained at Strodes College, the Oldham Theatre Workshop, the Northern Kids Theatre Company and at Webber Douglas Academy of Dramatic Art, London. At the age of 18, he left school to shoot for a TV show in Toronto.

== Career ==
=== 2001–2012: Early career ===
Gabel made his debut in 2001 as the character Jean-Claude Tournier in episode titled Breaking point of series 15 of BBC medical drama Casualty. In 2002, Gabel dropped out of drama school to appear on the children's fantasy sitcom I Love Mummy where he portrayed Pharaoh Prince Nuffratuti (Prince Nuff) of Abu Simbel, who is unable to ascend to the afterlife until he has completed his scroll of tasks. In 2004, he appeared as Steve in BBC One medical soap opera Doctors. In the same year, Gabel appeared as two different characters in different episodes of Casualty. He joined as series regular character Gurpreet Guppy Sandhu in the same show as a part of series 19. He was nominated as Most Popular Newcomer at the 2005 National Television Awards for the role. He also appeared as Gurpreet in episode four titled "Teacher's Pet" of Casualty@Holby City, a nine part special crossover series of Casualty and its spin off Holby City in 2005. He decided to leave Casualty in 2007 to pursue new acting challenges and concentrate on recording music with his band.

In 2008, he made his film debut portraying the character Ben in American supernatural horror film Boogeyman 3, the final installment of the Boogeyman film series. He went on to appear as Danny in Charlie Brooker's horror comedy drama miniseries based on a zombie outbreak titled Dead Set. In the same year, Gabel appeared as Vimal, a trainee priest, in the BBC drama Apparitions, alongside Martin Shaw. The first episode aired on BBC One on 13 November 2008. He then starred as P.E. teacher Rob Cleaver in the BBC One school drama Waterloo Road from series 4, which began on 7 January 2009. In 2010, Gabel starred in the 6-part British police procedural series Identity as DC Jose Rodriguez on ITV, a member of the identity unit. In the same year, he lent his voice to Apache: Air Assault, a combat flight simulator video game. In 2011, He played Prince Djem, brother of Sultan Bayezid II of the Ottoman Empire in Showtime's The Borgias. In the same year, he played Shahrouz in the second series of Psychoville and as Ahmed in war torn Baghdad based hostage drama Kingdom of Dust (2011).

He appeared as the Dothraki "Bloodrider" Rakharo, loyal bodyguard of Daenerys Targaryen in season 1 and the beginning of season 2 of HBO fantasy series Game of Thrones. According to the showrunners David Benioff and D. B. Weiss, the journey of his character in the show had to be cut short as he quit the show to pursue projects that put him more front and center. In 2011, he joined the cast of CIA procedural Fox pilot Exit Strategy, portraying transport expert Tarik Fayad alongside Ethan Hawke but the show was dropped after being considered for a midseason airing and later released as a television film. In the same year, he appeared as Jaz in British coming of age drama Everywhere and Nowhere alongside James Floyd and Adam Deacon. In 2012, he appeared as Troy Vargas in David Hubbard's Widow Detective. In the same year, he appeared as Umar in the Silent Witness two-part episode "And Then I Fell in Love".

That same year, Gabel founded his own production company Roughened Verse Entertainment and went to pursue more roles in the United States.

=== 2013–present: Career in the U.S. ===
In 2013, Gabel starred as Detective Adam Lucas in the third season of the American medical/crime comedy drama television series, Body of Proof on ABC. His character Adam Lucas was described as young, smart, a rebel and a Philadelphia native, who is a new entrant in the Philadelphia Homicide division. The show was ABC's third most-watched show and yet was cancelled by the channel after the third season. He appeared as Ruan Sternwood in Eran Creevy's action thriller Welcome to the Punch alongside James McAvoy, Mark Strong, and Andrea Riseborough. In the same year, he appeared as a young virologist Andrew Fassbach in World War Z, based on the 2006 novel of the same name by Max Brooks.

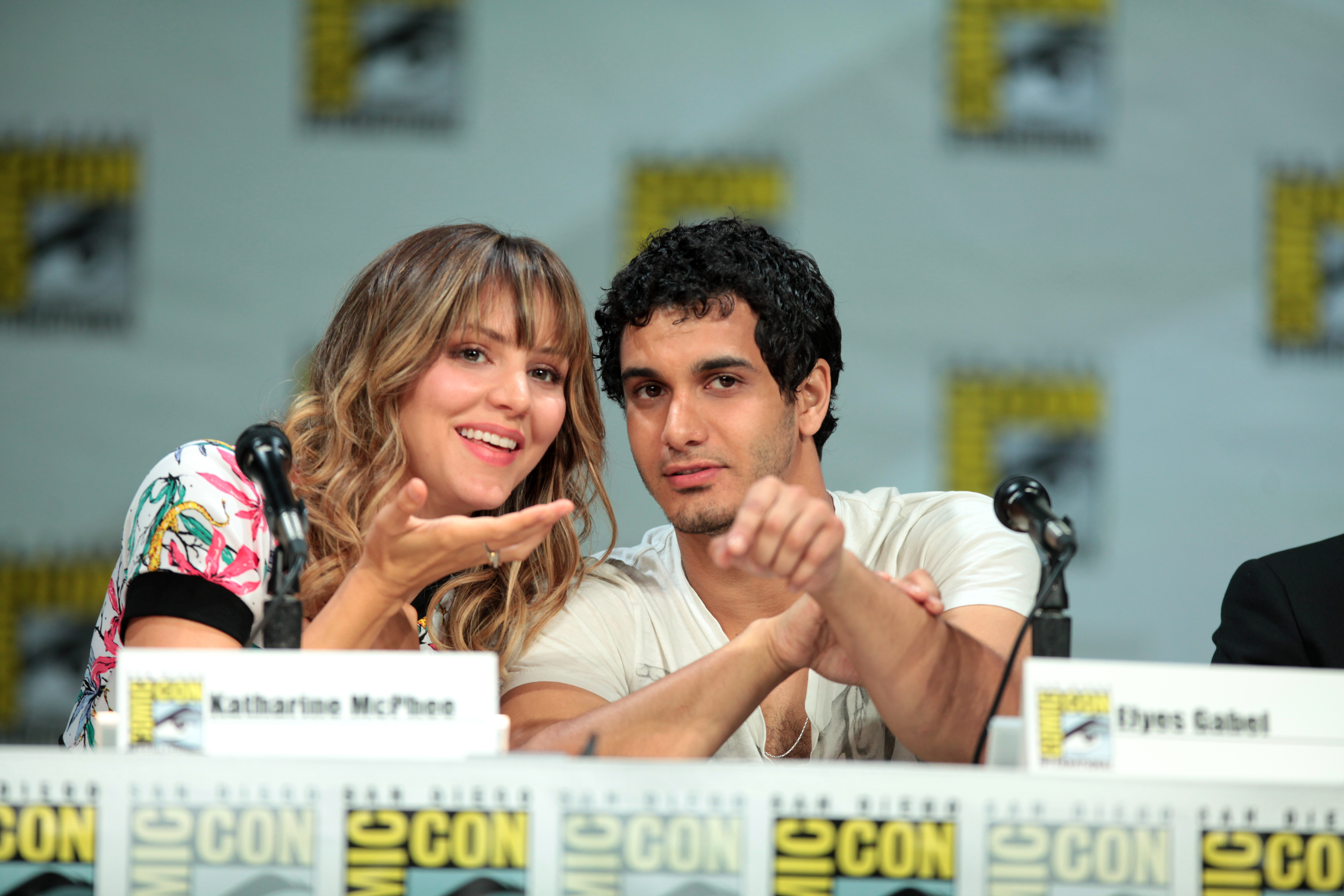
Katharine McPhee and Elyes Gabel speaking at the 2014 San Diego Comic-Con, for Scorpion.

Gabel starred as an eccentric computing genius Walter O'Brien on the American drama series Scorpion by Nick Santora on CBS, based on the real life of Walter O'Brien. According to the show creator Nick Santora, "Gabel was able to play the difficulty of expressing emotion while being emotional" for the character of Walter O'Brien, who had difficulty processing and expressing emotions. The series debuted on 22 September 2014 and became the highest rated and highest streamed drama for CBS. Scorpion also won The Golden Nymph award for 'Best Action & Science Fiction TV Series' in Monte-Carlo Television Festival (2018). The series was cancelled after four seasons and 93 episodes, despite having higher ratings than other cancellations with the last airing on 16 April 2018. Gabel starred in all 93 episodes of the series and was termed as one of the "11 Breakout Stars of the Fall TV Season 2014" by TheWrap and TVLine. In the same year, he made an appearance in a crossover episode of Scorpion with American action television series NCIS: Los Angeles.

In Christopher Nolan's science fiction film Interstellar, which premiered on 26 October 2014, Gabel had a small cameo appearance as the administrator who fanboyed over the lead character played by Matthew McConaughey and showed him to his quarters.

In November 2014, he was seen in J. C. Chandor's American crime drama film A Most Violent Year, which was among "323 feature films eligible for the 87th Academy Awards" as announced by the Academy of Motion Picture Arts and Sciences. A Most Violent Year premiered to great critical acclaim. Gabel played Supporting Lead. Several critics were much impressed by his portrayal of Latin American immigrant Julian, who becomes the sacrificial lamb in a politically motivated barter. In a review of the film, Howard Feinstein stated, "If there were an Oscar for best actor in a single scene, Gabel should win for his mad soliloquy on repentance and despair."

In 2015, he appeared as Adem Qasim, again a Supporting Lead role, in British spy thriller film Spooks: The Greater Good alongside Kit Harington and Jennifer Ehle. He is the primary antagonist of the film, a terrorist who escapes MI5 custody thanks to a traitor in MI5's leadership.

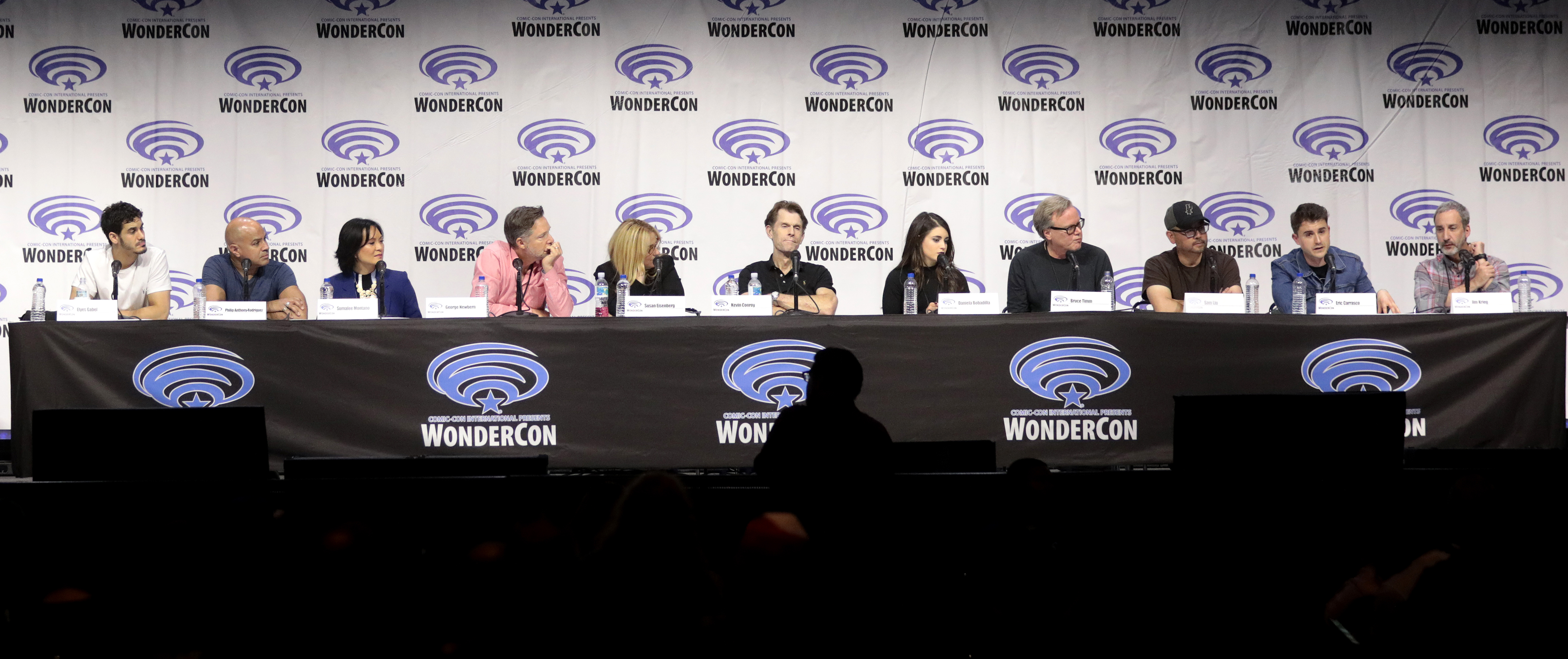
Justice League vs. the Fatal Five cast at WonderCon 2019

In 2019, Gabel voiced the superhero and Legion of Super-Heroes member Thomas Kallor, also known as Star Boy, in DC Entertainment's direct-to-video animated superhero film Justice League vs. the Fatal Five. Its world premiere was at WonderCon (March 29–31, 2019).

In 2020, he joined the cast of Suspicion on Apple TV+ an eight part thriller series which premiered on 4 February 2022, based on the Israeli TV series False Flag, Gabel portrayed British citizen Sean Tilson alongside Uma Thurman and Kunal Nayyar.

=== 2017–present: Filmmaking ===
In 2017, Gabel directed the pilot episode titled "Black White & a shade of grey" of TV series Stakes. In the same year he wrote, produced, directed and starred in his own passion project Game Show Hurt a piece that tells the story about a man who creates and hosts a game show which unconsciously plays out elements of the past. It is set to release soon. As the third filmmaker project of 2017, Gabel directed and produced a short feature film titled Grimshaw based on drug addiction and regression of individual freedom. The film gained critical acclaim, with wins for Best Narrative and honorable mentions as Best Featurette and Gabel himself gained a nomination as and a win as Best Director at two different film festivals.

== Personal life ==
Gabel was in a relationship with Sarah Barrand who played Shannon in Footballers' Wives. He met Scorpion co-star Katharine McPhee on set and they later dated, but split in early 2016.

=== Music ===
Gabel is a singer, songwriter and a guitarist who also fronts a band El & The Broken Bones. He considers music as passion and has expressed his love for emotional and haunting scores. Gabel along with his Casualty costar, Luke Bailey performed a rendition of The Beatles song "I Saw Her Standing There" in 2005 edition of annual BBC charity telethon for disadvantaged children and young people in the UK, Children in Need. In 2008, Gabel recorded a single along with Luke Bailey, Stephen Nicholas, Lee Otway, Junior Witter and Girls Aloud, under the collaboration UK Flow, a campaign aimed at raising money to fight the spate of knife crimes. In 2016, he did a karaoke rendition of Elton John's "Don't Go Breaking My Heart" alongside his costar Katharine McPhee in the season 2 episode "Sun of a Gun" and a musical in the season 4 episode "Extinction" (2017) for his show Scorpion.

== Philanthropy ==
In 2005, Gabel performed in Children in Need, an annual BBC charity telethon for disadvantaged children and young people in the UK. In 2008, he joined actors and sports stars to record a rap-single to support the Anti-knife campaign and raising money to fight the spate of knife crimes. He supports ALS Association Golden West Chapter to help in the fight to end ALS and raising awareness and funds for the disease in honor of his maternal grandmother Noreen Gurney who suffered from the disease via his fundraising page Teamelyes.org. In 2014, he was part of ALS Association Golden West Chapter's "walk to defeat ALS" alongside Renée Zellweger, Reese Witherspoon. In the same year, Gabel along with the cast of Scorpion was part of CBS Cares's awareness and discussion campaigns for Autism. He was associated with American Forces Network / AFN's Stop Bullying Body Positive campaign along with the Scorpion cast in 2015. In the same year, Gabel along with his Scorpion co-star Katharine Mcphee joined Sloane Stephens, CoCo Vandeweghe, Justin Gimelstob, Boris Kodjoe and others for a Pro-Am tennis tournament in Brentwood to help raise money for the United States Tennis Association Foundation, which supports tennis and educational programs, under- resourced youth, individuals with disabilities, and wounded, ill and injured service members, veterans and their families. Gabel was also involved in CBS Cares's awareness, discussions and fundraising campaigns for Multiple sclerosis (MS) during its awareness month, March in association with a nonprofit organization, National Multiple Sclerosis Society in 2017. In 2019, he supported "Raising the Stakes" charity by One Step Closer Foundation for raising funds towards helping people with cerebral palsy by participating in the Cerebral Palsy (CP) Celebrity Poker Tournament.

== Filmography ==
=== Film ===
| Year | Title | Role | Notes |
|---|---|---|---|
| 2008 | Boogeyman 3 | Ben | |
| 2011 | Kingdom of Dust: Beheading of Adam Smith | Ahmed | |
| 2011 | Everywhere and Nowhere | Jaz | |
| 2013 | Welcome to the Punch | Ruan Sternwood | |
| 2013 | World War Z | Andrew Fassbach | |
| 2014 | Interstellar | Administrator | |
| 2014 | A Most Violent Year | Julian | |
| 2015 | Spooks: The Greater Good | Adem Qasim | |
| 2019 | Justice League vs. the Fatal Five | Thom Kallor / Star Boy | Voice |
| 2024 | Game Show Hurt | Game show host / Defiant | Writer, producer and director |
| 2026 | The Odyssey | Elatus | |

=== Television ===
| Year | Title | Role | Notes |
|---|---|---|---|
| 2001 | Casualty | Jean-Claude Tournier | Episode: "Breaking Point" |
| 2002–2003 | I Love Mummy | Prince Nuffratuti / Nuff | 26 episodes |
| 2004 | Doctors | Steve | Episode: "They Never Cut the Cord" |
| 2004 | Casualty | Jude | Episode: "Where There's Life..." |
| 2004–2007 | Casualty | Gurpreet "Guppy" Sandhu | 127 episodes |
| 2005 | Children in Need | Himself | Performed a rendition of The Beatles song "I Saw Her Standing There" in 2005 edition of annual BBC charity telethon |
| 2005 | Casualty@Holby City | Gurpreet "Guppy" Sandhu | Episode: "Teacher's Pet" |
| 2008 | Dead Set | Danny | 3 episodes |
| 2008 | Apparitions | Vimal | Episode #1.1 |
| 2009 | Waterloo Road | Rob Cleaver | 10 episodes |
| 2010 | Identity | DC Jose Rodriguez | 6 episodes |
| 2011 | Psychoville | Shahrouz | 5 episodes |
| 2011 | The Borgias | Prince Djem | Episode: "The Moor" |
| 2011–2012 | Game of Thrones | Bloodrider Rakharo | 7 episodes |
| 2012 | Silent Witness | Umar | 2 episodes |
| 2012 | Widow Detective | Troy Vargas | Television film |
| 2013 | Body of Proof | Det. Adam Lucas | 13 episodes |
| 2014–2018 | Scorpion | Walter O'Brien | 93 episodes |
| 2015 | The Messengers | Walter | |
| 2015 | Exit Strategy | Tarik Fayad | Television film |
| 2016 | The Price Is Right | Walter O'Brien | Crossover with Scorpion S2 E18 "The Fast and the Nerdiest" |
| 2022 | Suspicion | Sean Tilson | 8 episodes |
| 2024 | FBI | Hassan Billal | Episode: "Creating A Monster" |

=== As writer, producer and director ===
| Year | Title | Notes | | | |
| Year | Title | Notes | Director | Producer | Screenwriter |
|---|---|---|---|---|---|
| 2017 | Stakes (TV series) | Episode: "Black, White & a Shade of Grey" | Yes | No | No |
| 2018 | Grimshaw | Short film | Yes | Yes | No |
| 2024 | Game Show Hurt | Short film | Yes | Yes | Yes |

== Theatre ==
| Year | Work | Role | Notes | Ref |
|---|---|---|---|---|
| 2003 | Fragile Land | Hassan | Hampstead Theatre, London | |
| 2003 | Mr Elliot | Ash | Chelsea Theatre, London | |
| 2004 | Headstone | Jack | Arcola Theatre, London | |
| 2006 | Borderline | Haroon | Royal Court Theatre | |
| 2008 | Prince of Delhi Palace | Happy | National theatre | |
| 2008 | The Projectionist | Mark | Audio-play/podcast | |
| 2009 | Awhi Tapu | | Finborough Theatre (UK Debut of New Zealand's Māori playwright) | |
| 2009 | Shades | Ali | Royal Court Theatre | |
| 2009 | The Secret of Iguando | | Radio play | |

== Awards and nominations ==
| Year | Award | Category | Work | Result | Refs |
|---|---|---|---|---|---|
| 2005 | National Television Awards | Most Popular Newcomer | Casualty | Nominated | |
| 2012 | Screen Actors Guild Awards | Outstanding Performance by an Ensemble in a Drama Series (shared with other cast) | Game of Thrones | Nominated | |
| 2018 | Top Shorts Film Festival | Jury prize for Best Narrative Film (shared with Cottrell Guidry) | Grimshaw | Won | |
| 2018 | Show Low Film Festival | Jury Award for Best Director | Grimshaw | Won | |
| 2018 | Independent Shorts Awards | Honorable Mention as Best Indie Short | Grimshaw | Won | |
| 2019 | Idyllwild International Festival of Cinema | Grand Jury Award for Best Director | Grimshaw | Nominated | |
| 2020 | CinEuphoria Awards | Merit – Honorary Award (shared with other cast) | Game of Thrones | Won | |
