= Don't Burst My Bubble =

Don't Burst My Bubble may refer to:

- "Don't Burst My Bubble", an episode of the television series Scorpion
- "Don't Burst My Bubble", a previously unreleased song included on the 2012 deluxe edition of Small Faces, the debut album by the British rock band the Small Faces
