= Identity (TV series) =

- Genre: Police procedural
- Created by: Ed Whitmore
- Starring: Aidan Gillen; Keeley Hawes; Holly Aird; Elyes Gabel; Shaun Parkes
- Composer: John Lunn
- Country of origin: United Kingdom
- Original language: English
- No. of series: 1
- No. of episodes: 6 (Episode list)

Production
- Executive producers: Kate Bartlett; Ed Whitmore
- Producer: Lachlan Mackinnon
- Running time: 51 minutes (including adverts)
- Production company: ITV Studios

Original release
- Network: ITV
- Release: 5 July – 9 August 2010

Identity is a British police procedural television series starring Aidan Gillen and Keeley Hawes, airing in the UK during July–August 2010. Concerning identity theft, the series was created and written by Ed Whitmore, a writer most noted for his work on the BBC's Waking the Dead and the ITV mini-series He Kills Coppers. It was cancelled on 19 October 2010, after a single series.

== Plot ==
In London, the Identity Unit, led by its founder, Detective Superintendent Martha Lawson, specializes in cases concerning identity fraud, by outsmarting, hunting down and unmasking the modern day Jekyll and Hydes.

Martha takes a risk in employing DI John Bloom, an SO10 officer who has just spent 15 years undercover. He knows first hand what it is like to pretend to be someone you are not. He is also only too aware of how easy it is to lose your own identity when you have lived a lie for the previous 15 years as a Dublin money launderer and bagman for the Turkish mafia, and the past will not go away.

Completing the team are Tessa Stein, IT expert in everything from trawling databases to cracking security codes; DS Anthony Wareing, who has his eye on promotion and a stance on cases that can err on the self-righteous, and DC José Rodriguez – cocky and self-assured, yet with a seriousness and sensitivity that gives him insight into cases.

As the series unfolds, DS Wareing becomes more and more concerned about Bloom's methods and frustrated by what he sees as Martha's blind and foolish indulgence of him.

== Cast ==
- Aidan Gillen as DI John Bloom
- Keeley Hawes as DSI Martha Lawson
- Holly Aird as Tessa Stein
- Elyes Gabel as DC Jose Rodriguez
- Shaun Parkes as DS Anthony Wareing
- Patrick Baladi as AC Hugh Wainwright

== Episodes ==
No.	Title	Directed by	Written by	Original release date	UK viewers (millions)
1	"Second Life"	Brendan Maher	Ed Whitmore	5 July 2010	6.37
Justin Curtis claims to have had his identity stolen when he stands accused of a hit and run accident. He names "Smith" as the thief and it is the Identity Unit's task to prove he exists.
2	"Chelsea Girl"	Brendan Maher	Ed Whitmore	12 July 2010	4.56
The Identity Unit investigates the murder of Olivia Knighton in Australia, when, hours after her death, records show another woman using her passport to enter the UK to fulfil a psychological need from her childhood. Identified as the mentally scarred Jane Calshaw, they have to find her father and his new fiancée to work out what she has planned.
3	"Pariah"	Brendan Maher	Ed Whitmore	19 July 2010	4.77
Amy Quilan and her son Sam, on a witness protection scheme after her husband kidnapped, ransomed and killed a seven-year-old girl, are exposed on the internet and are placed in grave danger. The Identity Unit investigates and find all involved are working to their own agendas.
4	"Reparation"	Andy Hay	Edward Bennett	26 July 2010	4.18
The Identity Unit have to prove an Indian businessman, with a dubious past lying in a guarded sick bed, is who he is claimed to be when he is about to sign a major government deal worth £50 million.
5	"Somewhere They Can't Find Me"	Andy Hay	Edward Bennett	2 August 2010	4.03
A respectable woman, admitted to hospital following a traffic accident, has the DNA of a woman terrorist missing for the past 25 years. When she escapes from hospital, the Identity Unit has to track her down; however, her past life is more complicated than they suspect.
6	"Tomorrow Comes Early"	Andy Hay	Ed Whitmore	9 August 2010	4.03
Bloom's past undercover life catches up with him when a mass grave containing the body of a Turkish mafia boss, in whose killing he was involved, is discovered. The Identity Unit is tasked with the job of identifying the victims.
