= Scorpion (TV series) =

American action drama series (2014–2018)

- Genre: Action; Drama
- Created by: Nick Santora
- Starring: Elyes Gabel; Katharine McPhee; Eddie Kaye Thomas; Jadyn Wong; Ari Stidham; Robert Patrick; Riley B. Smith
- Composers: Brian Tyler; Tony Morales
- Country of origin: United States
- Original language: English
- No. of seasons: 4
- No. of episodes: 93 (list of episodes)

Production
- Executive producers: Danielle Woodrow; Danny Rose; Scooter Braun; Walter O'Brien; Heather Kadin; Justin Lin; Nicholas Wootton; Nick Santora; Alex Kurtzman; Roberto Orci; David Foster
- Producers: Scott Manson; Troy Craig Poon; Clayton Townsend; Marco Black; Don Tardino; Rob Pearlstein; Agatha Aro Warren; Kevin J. Hynes; Adam Higgs
- Cinematography: Gyula Pados; Ken Glassing; David J. Miller; Fernando Argüelles
- Editors: Dylan Highsmith; Steven Sprung; Rosanne Tan; Eric Seaburn; J.J. Geiger; Heather McDougall; Peter Forslund; Anthony Miller; Christopher Petrus
- Running time: 40–44 minutes
- Production companies: K/O Paper Products; Black Jack Films; Perfect Storm; SB Projects; CBS Television Studios

Original release
- Network: CBS
- Release: September 22, 2014 – April 16, 2018

Scorpion (stylized as </SCORPION>) is an American action drama television series created by Nick Santora for CBS. The series stars Elyes Gabel (Walter O'Brien), Katharine McPhee (Paige Dineen), Eddie Kaye Thomas (Tobias Curtis), Jadyn Wong (Happy Quinn), Ari Stidham (Sylvester "Sly" Dodd), and Robert Patrick (Cabe Gallo). Very loosely based on the life of executive producer Walter O'Brien, the series centers on O'Brien and his friends helping to solve complex global problems and save lives. The series premiered on September 22, 2014. On October 27, 2014, CBS placed a full-season episode order for the first season. In March 2017, CBS renewed the series for a fourth season, which premiered on September 25, 2017.

Scorpion received mixed critical reception. On May 12, 2018, CBS cancelled the series after four seasons.

== Plot ==
Scorpion is said to be the last line of defense against complex, high-technology threats around the globe. Drawing on a diverse set of skills and experience, such as coding, psychology and engineering, they can solve these situations. The team tackles a variety of problems, many of which are extremely complicated. While they are frequently called into service by the Department of Homeland Security, they also accept work from private individuals and organizations.

== Cast and characters ==
=== Main ===
- Elyes Gabel as Walter O'Brien, a genius with an IQ of 197. He was arrested for hacking into NASA's mainframe as a child, seeking a set of blueprints to put on his bedroom wall. He has a hard time handling emotional situations. Walter is incredibly intelligent, but also has a very low EQ. He is blunt and does not really care how his words affect others, causing him to come off as arrogant and rude. Due both to his high IQ and low EQ, he has problems connecting with people, even geniuses he has known for years. He fears being alone, though he once claimed to not have feelings, a notion he has since rejected. He is confident and when he sees a problem, he wants to solve it. He cares for his friends, so much so that he is willing to risk his life for them without a second thought. When he believed he was going to die, he told them stories of his fond memories of them, his way of telling them he loved them. He has occasionally said warm words to them, but rarely. Not only does he not often express emotions, but also when faced with grief or anger or other extreme emotions, he compartmentalizes his feelings until something triggers them and then they all come gushing out. His inability to express emotions normally stems mainly from the fact that for most of his life, he only ever connected with two people - his sister, Megan, and his surrogate father, Cabe Gallo. His relationship with Megan was very loving and the only friction in it was caused by their different views on her multiple sclerosis. Walter can be selfish and arrogant at times, but at heart is a kind individual who is always willing to help others and lay down his life for them, if need be, especially for his loved ones.
- Katharine McPhee as Paige Dineen, whose mother had her when she was 17. Her mother was frequently in jail for various kinds of fraud, so Paige would lie to her friends and say her mom was a saleswoman. Eventually, her mom left. At 22, Paige had her son Ralph with her then-boyfriend Drew, but eventually, he left, telling Ralph he was going to see a movie. When Ralph was three, they were evicted. She worked at a diner until she met team Scorpion. She now serves as office manager for the team and helps to "translate" the real world for them, to help them interact with the people they meet. In turn, the team helps her understand her genius son, Ralph. Paige is very kind, caring, and emotional. Not only is she a great mother to Ralph, but also she plays the role of the team's mother, as she takes care of them, makes sure they eat, socialize, and have fun. Though Paige is not one of the geniuses, she manages to fit in on numerous situations. While she is not an intellectual genius, because she has humanitarian and social knowledge that none of her other teammates possess, she is occasionally the one with the right solution. Paige is very empathetic, and she likes to embrace that, and help others embrace it, as well.
- Eddie Kaye Thomas as Tobias "Toby" Merriweather Curtis, M.D., a Harvard-trained psychiatrist with an IQ of 170, which is the lowest on the team. Toby serves the team as a behaviorist, "reading" people whom the team encounters. His gambling addiction occasionally causes trouble for the team and him. Toby was raised in Brooklyn and attended PS 90 in Coney Island. His mother was clinically bipolar, and his dad often forgot he was there because Toby's mom's disorder drove him crazy. Toby decided to become a psychiatrist to help his parents. His father would also take him to tracks on Christmas Day, and later to pay for school, Toby began to gamble, which led to an addiction and often trouble with loan sharks. His fiancée left him because of his addiction. He received his doctorate when he was 17. Toby is a narcissist with a slight dusting of addiction tendencies. He is usually humorous, but can become very serious in appropriate situations (for example when Happy Quinn is in danger). He usually jokes in inappropriate situations, as well. He makes these jokes to cover his true feelings about both his failed previous engagement and his parents’ mental issues that he failed to cure. He met Walter at the Cornet Room, a sleazy casino where he hustled. Walter intervened and bailed him out, just as he was about to receive a beating from the pit boss. He starts dating Happy and they are later married.
- Jadyn Wong as Happy Quinn, a gifted mechanical engineer with an IQ of 178. She was named for her parents' favorite song, R.E.M.'s "Shiny Happy People". Her mother died giving birth to her, which led to her father becoming an alcoholic, so he gave her up for adoption because he thought he was an unfit parent. Happy never found a real home, constantly moving from foster home to foster home. Many of these homes promised they would be the last one, but inevitably sent her back. This could be why she has a difficult time interacting with and relating to others. Eventually, she found a cousin who owns a mechanic shop in Phoenix, Arizona, where she became interested in the profession. Happy has a hostile exterior. Her name is "Happy," but generally she is not happy. The trauma in the foster system caused her mistrust of people. She possibly has PTSD from her trauma, and her symptoms include flashbacks, aggression, and avoidance of certain memories. She normally keeps her emotions in check, but gets angry quickly and tries to deal with her pain by turning it into rage. Despite being closed off, she truly does love her friends. Toby and she start dating and are later married.
- Ari Stidham as Sylvester "Sly" Dodd, a gifted mathematician and statistician with an IQ of 184; he is described as a "human calculator". He is a highly sensitive person and struggles with obsessive–compulsive disorder and anxiety, and harbors fears of germs, air transportation, and boats and open water. He has more phobias than can be counted (including claustrophobia and ornithophobia) and an eidetic memory. Sly's phobias can be limiting, but he is a courageous man who fights through those fears during times of distress. His parents were frustrated with him, as he was a disappointment to them, and sent him to live with his uncle before Christmas one year. However, at the age of 16, he hacked a bank and stole $2,500, and ran away. Eventually, he ended up alone, broke, and scared, "contemplating bad things", until the bank's forensic analyst tracked him down. Walter never reported him to the bank. Once, his father gave him weights as a gift, as his father wanted him to be into sports. He was married to Walter's sister Megan before she died.
- Robert Patrick as Agent Cabe Gallo, a former Marine and an FBI agent before joining Homeland Security; Gallo initially recruits the team to fix a serious air traffic control problem; afterwards, he asked them to become a liaison team to tackle difficult missions that the government does not have the human resources or technological prowess to handle. When he was younger, he was married to a woman named Rebecca, with whom he had a daughter, Amanda, who died of a terminal illness at a young age with him by her side. He divorced Rebecca, but he only asked for their house. He first met 11-year-old Walter when he was the agent who was sent to investigate the NASA hacker, and he recruited Walter to work for the government. He was Walter's handler and father figure for five years until he asked Walter to design some tracking software for "humanitarian purposes". However, the software was really used to bomb Baghdad and kill 2,000 civilians. Walter broke all ties with Cabe, but was continuously tailed thereafter by Homeland. Cabe is an outgoing man who seeks to help those he loves, and seems to have a lot of trust in his people. In the show, Cabe demonstrates this trust to his surrogate son Walter, with whom he had difficulties in the past. Walter even states outright near the end of season three that out of all the crew, Cabe trusts him the most. Cabe is a very forgiving person, given Walter's actions in the past, but when Allie, his girlfriend, betrays Sylvester by posting humiliating videos of him under the instruction of her boss, Cabe cannot forgive and ends the relationship. With Sylvester’s encouragement, they later get back together.
- Riley B. Smith as Ralph Dineen (recurring season 1, main seasons 2–4), Paige's son. He is initially believed to be a troubled child before meeting and interacting with Walter, who tells Paige that he is actually a genius. He interacts well with the team, and on occasion, assists with cases. Ralph was born to Paige Dineen and Drew Baker, and unbeknownst to them, was a genius. His father left when he was young, saying he was going to go see a movie, so Ralph had little memory of his father. Later, when Ralph had a sense of math, he started counting how many movies his dad would have seen until the present day. He has an IQ of 200.

=== Recurring ===
- Camille Guaty as Megan O'Brien (seasons 1–2), Walter's sister and Sylvester's wife, who had multiple sclerosis, a condition that Walter sought to "fix" to repay the favor of her always being there throughout his childhood. She died in the episode "Arrivals and Departures" after suffering complications due to her disease.
- Brendan Hines as Drew Baker (season 1), Ralph's biological father, who is a struggling minor-league baseball player.
- Daniel Zolghadri as Young Walter (season 1)
- David Fabrizio as Paul Merrick (seasons 1–2), the Director of Homeland Security. After the events of season 1, Merrick was demoted and reassigned as Homeland Security's liaison to NASA. He dies in the episode "Da Bomb" after being exposed as a mole for China.
- Andy Buckley as Richard Elia, a billionaire technology mogul who wants Walter to work for his company.
- Jamie McShane as Patrick Quinn, a mechanic and father of Happy.
- Joshua Leonard as Mark Collins, a former member of Team Scorpion, who kidnapped Toby.
- Alana de la Garza as Adriana Molina (season 2), the new Director of Homeland Security, who is Merrick's successor. Eventually, as of "Fish Filet", she is no longer interacting with team Scorpion since Cabe called her a disappointment for offering to leave Sylvester in a prison to die.
- Kevin Weisman as Ray Spiewack (seasons 2–4), Walter's new buddy from community service; Ray is a former firefighter who has post-traumatic stress after losing his best friend in a fire 10 years ago. After Paige leaves the team briefly, Ray temporarily joins Scorpion. He also conducts Sylvester and Megan O'Brien's wedding, and sometimes hangs out outside the Scorpion headquarters.
- Peri Gilpin as Katherine Cooper (season 2), the Deputy Homeland Security Director who takes over for Molina as Scorpion's Homeland liaison; before working with Scorpion, Cooper had never served in the field.
- Pete Giovine as Chet (season 2), Happy's "date", a comedian who is her comedy coach.
- Horatio Sanz as Heywood "Jahelpme" Morris (season 2), a lawyer with his own TV commercial who first takes on Sylvester's game-show contract case, then eventually becomes the team's personal attorney.
- Brooke Nevin as Linda (season 2), a matchmaker in speed dating whom Walter ends up briefly dating in an attempt to try to connect emotionally with others.
- Scott Porter as Tim Armstrong (seasons 2–3), a Homeland Security trainee and former Navy SEAL, whom Cabe brings in to work with Scorpion. Armstrong starts to develop feelings for Paige on their first meeting, and he soon takes Paige out on a date. Armstrong also takes Paige to a jazz concert upon Walter's insistence; however, Walter intended the tickets to the concert for Paige and himself. Although initially established as a master chief petty officer, Tim's uniform for the United States Marine Corps birthday ball in "We're Gonna Need a Bigger Vote" is that of a lieutenant. In "Don't Burst My Bubble", Paige and Tim are revealed to have broken up.
- Lea Thompson as Veronica Dineen (season 3), a con artist and Paige's mother, with whom Paige does not get along.
- Reiko Aylesworth as Allie Jones (seasons 3–4), who works for the campaign of the city councilman against whom Sylvester is running, and who later dates Cabe.
- Nikki Castillo as Patricia "Patty" Logan (seasons 3–4), a high-schooler and Sylvester's manager for his campaign, who has been a reporter since sixth grade. After interviewing Sly, Patty becomes his intern and often hangs out around Scorpion, occasionally getting caught up in their cases. She is a perfectionist who is known for never being tardy. Ralph develops a romantic interest in Patty, something she appears oblivious to though she and Ralph are good friends.
- Tina Majorino as Florence "Flo" Tipton (season 4), a chemist whose lab is next to the team's garage. After initial tensions between Flo and Scorpion's members, she develops a friendly relationship with the team and begins assisting them with cases. She ends up being a romantic interest for Walter which causes Paige to leave him at the end of Season 4.
- Jeff Galfer as Dr. Quincy Berkstead (seasons 2–4), a hated nemesis of Toby Curtis and annoying, pop psychologist married to Toby's ex-fiancée Amy.

== Production ==
=== Development ===
According to Walter O'Brien, the idea for the show came from his company Concierge Up when they asked the question, "How do we attract more bright people to contract with our company to work on interesting projects?". They decided to pitch the idea for a 10-season show that would compete with CSI: Crime Scene Investigation and "inspire a whole generation to see that 'smart is cool'".

CBS leadership viewed the show as a dramatic variation of another CBS show, The Big Bang Theory – at that time the nation's most popular TV comedy – which featured a cast of similar brainy-young-nerd characters. CBS Primetime senior executive vice president Kelly Kahl, in a 2014 interview, indicated that CBS had intended the show as "kind of an extension of The Big Bang Theory but in the drama world."

== Episodes ==
Season	Episodes	Originally released		Rank	Avg. viewership (in millions)
Season	Episodes	First released	Last released	Rank	Avg. viewership (in millions)
1	22	September 22, 2014	April 20, 2015	15	13.63
2	24	September 21, 2015	April 25, 2016	17	12.05
3	25	October 3, 2016	May 15, 2017	22	10.65
4	22	September 25, 2017	April 16, 2018	43	8.38

== Reception ==
=== Ratings ===
Scorpion premiered on CBS on Monday nights in the fall of 2014, in a 10 pm (Eastern) time slot that had become an underperformer for CBS. To give Scorpion an initial boost in audience for the first few weeks, CBS scheduled it to come on immediately after episodes of The Big Bang Theory, at that time television's most popular comedy. Scorpion became CBS's highest-rated drama series for the advertiser-sought 18- to 49-year-old TV audience demographic. "Live + 7" numbers showed a 4.5 rating in the key demographic, and Nielsen ratings were a 3.7. The results helped CBS's primetime growth-leadership that fall, CBS's Monday night having improved more than any other night, not only for CBS, but also more than any night for any of the "Big 4" networks.

The increase in CBS's own ratings in the Monday 10 pm time slot was sizeable - a 65% total-audience increase over the same period a year earlier, and a 23% boost since that period for the age 18-49 audience. Even after it was detached from The Big Bang Theory, the show continued to rank as the second-most popular new drama on CBS. In the older-focused 25- to 54-year-old audience demographic segment, Scorpion initially averaged a 4.9, the second-highest ranking new show in that audience, improving the network's previous-year performance in that time slot by 29%. (L+7's measurement of 25-54 year olds put Scorpion at 6.0.) Scorpion's initial popularity extended beyond immediate-broadcast audiences, to include delayed-viewing audiences, making Scorpion CBS's most-streamed new show of the season, initially, across multiple platforms.

Viewership and ratings per season of Scorpion
Season	Timeslot (ET)	Episodes	First aired		Last aired		TV season	Viewership rank	Avg. viewers (millions)	18–49 rank	Avg. 18–49 rating
Season	Timeslot (ET)	Episodes	Date	Viewers (millions)	Date	Viewers (millions)	TV season	Viewership rank	Avg. viewers (millions)	18–49 rank	Avg. 18–49 rating
1	Monday 9:00 pm	22	September 22, 2014	13.83	April 20, 2015	10.71	2014–15	15	13.63	19	3.1
2	Monday 9:00 pm	24	September 21, 2015	11.09	April 25, 2016	8.98	2015–16	17	12.05	24	2.5
3	Monday 10:00 pm	25	October 3, 2016	8.30	May 15, 2017	7.89	2016–17	22	10.65	28	2.0
4	Monday 10:00 pm	22	September 25, 2017	5.75	April 16, 2018	5.22	2017–18	43	8.38	62	1.5

=== Critical response ===
Scorpion has received mixed reviews from critics. On Rotten Tomatoes, season one holds a rating of 42% based on 48 reviews, with an average rating of 5.1/10. The site's critical consensus reads, "Typical procedural plot lines and boring characters using a distracting amount of geek-speak make Scorpion a forgettable show without sting." On Metacritic, the show has a score of 48 out of 100, based on 24 critic reviews, indicating "mixed or average reviews".

On Rotten Tomatoes, season two holds a rating of 80% based on 5 reviews, with an average rating of 10/10.

The show premiered on September 22, 2014, earning a 3.2 rating in the 18–49 demographic and 13.83 million total viewers. This improved CBS' Monday 9 p.m. time slot from the previous season by 66% in total viewers and 22% in the 18–49 demographic. It was also Monday's top new series in viewers and key demographics. The number of viewers during the first season across all platforms was 26 million.

== Broadcast ==
Scorpion was picked up in 14 countries, including in the UK by ITV2 for broadcast starting on October 23, 2014. The series premiered in fall on RTÉ2 in Ireland. Australian Network Ten began airing the show on September 28. In New Zealand, Prime began airing the show on October 10. The show aired in Canada on City simultaneously with CBS. The series aired first on Rai 2 and then by Rai 4 in Italy from 2015 to 2019.

A special 63-minute episode, "Tech, Drugs, and Rock 'n' Roll", was originally aired as a single episode in season two, but shown in Britain and its overseas territories in two parts.
