= Walter O'Brien (Scorpion) =

Fictional character in television series

- Scorpion character
- Elyes Gabel as Walter O'Brien
- First appearance: "Pilot"
- Last appearance: "A Lie in the Sand"
- Created by: Scooter Braun; Walter O'Brien
- Portrayed by: Elyes Gabel

In-universe information
- Occupation: Hacker, Computer expert
- Family: Megan O'Brien (sister); Sean O'Brien (father); Louise O'Brien (mother)
- Relatives: Sylvester Dodd (brother-in-law)
- Nationality: Irish, American (After S3E7 – A Bigger Vote)

Walter O'Brien is the fictional lead character in the American drama television series, Scorpion. The character is inspired by the Irish businessman and information technologist of the same name. The character, played by actor Elyes Gabel, follows a loose trajectory of Walter O'Brien's alleged real-life exploits that thwart terrorism and disasters in each episode of the series.

== Character origin and casting ==
Walter O'Brien approached Scorpion executive producer Scooter Braun with the idea of making a show about him in order to attract more genius employees to his company. Actor Elyes Gabel stars as Walter O'Brien in the Scorpion television series.

== Characterization ==
Recurring protagonist Walter O'Brien is a genius with a 197 IQ. Agent Cabe Gallo was the person who brought him from Ireland to America after O'Brien hacked into NASA computers to get a set of blueprints for his wall.

Walter O'Brien and a team of outcasts that he befriends and works with are recruited by federal agent Cabe Gallo of the U.S. Department of Homeland Security to form Scorpion, said to be the last line of defense against complex, high-tech threats around the globe. The team includes O'Brien and his friends Sylvester Dodd, a "human calculator" dealing in statistics; Happy Quinn, a "mechanical prodigy"; and Toby Curtis, a "world-class shrink" (a Harvard-trained behaviorist). Paige Dineen is a former waitress whose intuitive interaction with people translates the real world to the team, and they, in exchange, translate her young mentally gifted son, Ralph, to her.

=== Personality ===
O'Brien is often described as the stereotypical computer "nerd". He is usually characterized as extremely intelligent, socially inept, and rigidly logical. He regularly displays a lack of emotional intelligence and empathy, preferring to use logic and reasoning to “fix” the world around him. His beyond genius-level IQ allows him to solve problems that other people could not, but it also diminishes his ability to relate and empathize with other people. When O'Brien feels like he is failing at a task, he panics and starts to lash out at those around him.

Like his friends in team Scorpion, O'Brien is scientifically inclined and gifted with computers. He sometimes shows empathy, particularly towards the empathetic waitress Paige Dineen, who coaches O'Brien and his Scorpion team as they attempt to mature emotionally.

=== Relationships ===
O'Brien forms a relationship with Paige, (played by Katharine McPhee), a struggling waitress when she meets O'Brien and his team in the pilot episode. She works to help O'Brien and his team interact with normal people and learns from O'Brien that her son is not challenged but really a genius. She also seems to have feelings for O'Brien, but has trouble dealing with them due to Walter's not believing that love and emotion are real. The two eventually begin a romantic relationship.

In the plot, Agent Cabe Gallo recruits O'Brien and his team to help the United States government fix a serious air traffic control problem and then asks them to become a liaison team to tackle difficult missions that arise that the main government organizations do not have the manpower or technological prowess to handle, like stolen nuclear weapons and similar issues. He was the one who brought Walter over from Ireland and then worked with him for several years. They had a falling out when O'Brien was 16 over civilian casualties during an attack on Iraq using a computer program that Walter had created for humanitarian purposes.

O'Brien's sister, Megan O'Brien (deceased), who he was very close to, and a mother and father, who he is less close to, though his sister's death helped him try to mend their burnt bridges. He also grew up in Callan, Ireland, where his sister got him out of trouble when he was too much of a smart aleck.

O'Brien's relationship with his team is a little rocky, owing to his low EQ panics and rages, which happen usually whenever they run into trouble in a mission. But thankfully, Paige helps calm him down and keep him from going too far and to stay productive. But even after this, his team members still respect him as a leader of them and like him as a friend, even when he can be a little short sighted and thinks of the world in only logical steps and explainable equations as opposed to human unpredictability and emotions.

== See also ==
- Real person fiction
