= List of Scorpion episodes =

Scorpion is an American drama television series developed by Nick Santora for CBS. The series premiered on September 22, 2014, and is loosely based on the life of self-proclaimed genius and computer expert Walter O'Brien. The series follows Walter O'Brien and his team of genius outcasts as they are recruited by federal agent Cabe Gallo of the U.S. Department of Homeland Security to form Scorpion, said to be the last line of defense against complex, high-tech threats around the globe.

On May 12, 2018, CBS cancelled the series after four seasons. During the course of the series, 93 episodes of Scorpion aired, between September 22, 2014, and April 16, 2018.

== Series overview ==
Season	Episodes	Originally released		Rank	Avg. viewership (in millions)
Season	Episodes	First released	Last released	Rank	Avg. viewership (in millions)
1	22	September 22, 2014	April 20, 2015	15	13.63
2	24	September 21, 2015	April 25, 2016	17	12.05
3	25	October 3, 2016	May 15, 2017	22	10.65
4	22	September 25, 2017	April 16, 2018	43	8.38

== Episodes ==
=== Season 1 (2014–15) ===
No. overall	No. in season	Title	Directed by	Written by	Original release date	U.S. viewers (millions)
1	1	"Pilot"	Justin Lin	Teleplay by : Nick Santora	September 22, 2014	13.83
Special Agent Cabe Gallo hires former child prodigy Walter O'Brien to lead a team of his brilliant friends. They are assigned their first mission by the government to help land airplanes at LAX when the air to ground communication system is shut down by a bug in the new traffic control software. They instantly connect with a waitress named Paige, the mother of a genius child.
2	2	"Single Point of Failure"	Bobby Roth	David Foster	September 29, 2014	13.36
Team Scorpion is called upon by the governor when his daughter is a victim of biohacking and has only 24 hours to live. The mission hits a raw nerve with Walter, who receives a letter regarding his sister Megan's worsening multiple sclerosis. Toby reaches out to his ex-fiancée, Happy is not so happy about people letting her down in her past, and Cabe is reminded of the loss of his own daughter while working this case.
3	3	"A Cyclone"	Gary Fleder	Nick Santora & Nicholas Wootton	October 6, 2014	12.05
After failing a military training exercise ordered by Director Merrick, the team is determined to prove their worth. When Internet infrastructure is threatened by random bomb strikes around the city, they set up their own operation to find the bomber. Cabe takes them off the mission for violating orders, while Paige tries to find her place on the team.
4	4	"Shorthanded"	Dwight H. Little	Elizabeth Beall	October 13, 2014	11.51
Wanting publicity on their last case, Scorpion takes on a private contract in spite of Cabe's objections. They travel to Las Vegas to help a casino that is losing money on their high-roller blackjack tables. Walter sees a heist about to happen, but he is accused of masterminding the robbery and is sent to jail. However, his team is able to crack the case and exonerate him, with Cabe's help.
5	5	"Plutonium Is Forever"	Jeff T. Thomas	Paul Grellong	October 20, 2014	10.75
A nuclear reactor at a Los Angeles power plant with an out-of-date system nears a cataclysmic meltdown. Walter must enlist the help of genius Mark Collins (Joshua Leonard), a troubled former team member who brought him "down the rabbit hole", what he calls a dissociative state of intelligent thought years ago that almost jeopardized Scorpion.
6	6	"True Colors"	Jeff Hunt	Rob Pearlstein	October 27, 2014	10.39
After taking a security job at an art museum, Scorpion is accused of destroying a priceless piece of art which they determine is a forgery. They must pass a mandated psychological evaluation or be banned from all Homeland assignments. Gallo has a connection, Hetty Lange (Linda Hunt), who is the operations manager of NCIS in Los Angeles and who helps them track down the real painting. Paige tasks Walter with an experiment to gain emotional quotient so his team can get more work, and also asks them for help when Ralph does not have anyone to go with him to his school's Halloween party.
7	7	"Father's Day"	Milan Cheylov	Nick Santora	November 3, 2014	10.34
When Ralph's absentee father Drew calls the Scorpion office to talk to Paige, it triggers the familial memories of everyone. The team tries to protect Ralph by running a background check on Drew, who is a struggling minor league baseball player. Meanwhile, the team is tasked with finding out how three convicts, including a high IQ hacktivist, escaped from a high-tech prison and as to what their plan really is.
8	8	"Risky Business"	Matt Earl Beesley	Nicholas Wootton	November 10, 2014	10.08
A musical prodigy (Scott Mescudi), who created a controversial algorithm that generates the perfect hit pop song, helps Scorpion investigate the murder of his friend who was a music industry blogger. Meanwhile, Drew takes Ralph out to a baseball game and later visits the team's garage to seek Walter's advice to help him connect with his son. Also, Walter needs a distraction and takes on a new hobby—street racing supercars around town at night.
9	9	"Rogue Element"	Jerry Levine	Paul Grellong & Kim Rome	November 17, 2014	10.17
Scorpion tries to help Cabe after he is alerted by a distress code sent by his ex-wife Rebecca (Jessica Tuck), who fears she is being targeted for stumbling upon a money trail linked to the assassination of a prominent congressman and special elections to be held thereafter. Meanwhile, Drew thanks Walter for the kinetic pitching diagnostic analysis improving his fastball speed; however, this lands him a tryout with a Double-A baseball team in Portland, Maine and does not know what to do with Ralph.
10	10	"Talismans"	Sam Hill	Alex Katsnelson	November 24, 2014	9.28
When an F-120 Hawkwing carrying a classified cloaking radar device goes down over Bosnia, Scorpion must help a disapproving Navy SEALs team locate the jet, recover the stealth technology and find the pilot's remains. Also, on a request from the pilot's wife, they have to retrieve his special necklace. After a drunken run-in with the police in an attempt at temporary freedom from her MS and the hospital, Megan meets the team, who are taken aback that Walter would even bring his sister to the garage in the first place.
11	11	"Revenge"	Mel Damski	Elizabeth Beall & David Foster	December 8, 2014	10.00
During an investigation on an international brutal gang of thieves called "The Ghosts", who broke into a complex system safe from a warehouse, Sylvester ends up seriously injured after accidentally triggering an explosive device that was left behind. Not only does the team have to keep their composure as their friend is in critical condition in the hospital, they must work with Interpol and remain focused on finding the culprits. Meanwhile, Drew grows closer to Ralph and also wants to get close with Paige again.
12	12	"Dominoes"	Omar Madha	Rob Pearlstein & Nick Santora	December 15, 2014	10.07
On Christmas Eve, Scorpion must race against time in order to save a young boy who gets trapped in a 14-foot deep sinkhole in a cave at Zuma Beach, where the rising tide threatens his life. Walter pulls some favors to get Megan into a study with a new MS drug, but she does not want to be a guinea pig. Meanwhile, since Drew has to miss the holiday with Ralph for a baseball try-out in Portland, Paige tries to bring the Christmas spirit to the team by decorating, giving them gifts and hosting a holiday dinner at the garage.
13	13	"Kill Screen"	Jace Alexander	Nicholas Wootton & Paul Grellong	January 5, 2015	12.32
Scorpion must help Ralph when he is brought in for questioning by the DOJ after he unlocks a secret level in a dark website video game that unintentionally revealed the location of a CIA safe house in Culiacán, Mexico, resulting in the murders of two agents. Meanwhile, Walter enters an aerospace contest by studying jet propulsion on a dismantled CL-460 rocket engine he purchased to win $15 million for Megan's MS research.
14	14	"Charades"	Christine Moore	Rob Pearlstein	January 18, 2015	12.29
When the CIA's Internal Affairs Division intercepts an encrypted message that was sent by someone in their L.A. office, Scorpion must uncover the mole who leaked classified information and snuck out chemicals for pesticides to an aid worker he loves in Yemen, thinking it was for a humanitarian cause. The team is confronted with stopping a seductive agent trying to produce nerve gas with the stolen chemicals. Meanwhile, Paige confronts her feelings for Walter and helps him prepare for the case by giving him a lesson in flirting.
15	15	"Forget Me Nots"	Jann Turner	Alex Katsnelson & Nick Santora	January 19, 2015	12.08
When an attempted hack tries to launch a weapon of mass destruction at a nuclear missile silo in Keflavik, Iceland, the team must help an institutionalized former POTUS Secret Service agent (David James Elliott) to remember events from 16 years previously in order to prevent a nuclear attack on an American ally. Meanwhile, Paige is torn between staying in L.A. or moving 3,000 miles away after Drew finds a gifted school for Ralph in Portland, Maine, causing Walter to get in the middle of her decision.
16	16	"Love Boat"	Sam Hill	Elizabeth Beall & Kim Rome	February 9, 2015	11.86
As Valentine's Day approaches, Scorpion must search for stolen experimental shoulder-launch rockets that are being transported aboard a luxury cruise ship, and identify the arms dealer who is transporting them and targeting the one percenters aboard. Meanwhile, Happy and Toby help Ralph awe his first crush and Sylvester makes a valentine for Megan. Also, Walter plans to take Paige out to a top L.A. restaurant, but cancels after the mission.
17	17	"Going South"	David Grossman	Nick Santora & Nicholas Wootton	February 23, 2015	10.69
Billionaire tech mogul, Richard Elia hires Scorpion to rescue his daughter who was kidnapped by a Mexican drug cartel while on a journalism assignment. Meanwhile, wanting media coverage for the team, Walter gives an interview to a local news station, but the story has misinformation and he also fails to acknowledge the other members, hurting their feelings in the process. Later, Sylvester tries to find the right time to tell Walter that he is dating Megan and resorts to blurting it out during their case.
18	18	"Once Bitten, Twice Die"	Guy Ferland	David J. North	March 9, 2015	10.59
When a century-long border conflict between Belarus, Lithuania and Latvia reignites, Scorpion is called in by Homeland to help facilitate secret peace talks to prevent this developing crisis escalating into World War III. Meanwhile, wanting to better herself and set a good example for Ralph, Paige re-enrolls in college and starts going to night classes so she can finish her Liberal Arts degree. Merrick threatens Cabe with disclosing details of a past case to Walter. Also, Happy and Toby's friendship takes a brief hiatus.
19	19	"Young Hearts Spark Fire"	Mel Damski	Paul Grellong & Jay Beattie & Dan Dworkin	March 23, 2015	9.70
After Scorpion's helicopter crashes while on a mission to save lost hikers from a church group, the crash ignites a massive wildfire that quickly closes in on them due to the Santa Ana winds. Meanwhile, Sylvester tries to help the injured pilot (Rick Ravanello) who is unable to make it to safer ground through the rapidly spreading brushfire. Also, Toby tries to mathematically prove his "Walter likes Paige" theory by concocting an elaborate diagram.
20	20	"Crossroads"	Kevin Hooks	David Foster & Rob Pearlstein	March 30, 2015	9.38
When Scorpion helps the U.S. Marshals in the protection of a key witness set to testify against a vicious Nicaraguan crime syndicate called the DL, they end up taking her on the run across the two counties, with the gang's leader hot on their trail. Meanwhile, a nervous Toby takes an Alprazolam and accidentally falls asleep, missing his dinner date with Happy who does not accept his apology. Later, he talks Walter into taking a risk by telling Paige he has feelings for her.
21	21	"Cliffhanger"	Sam Hill	Nick Santora & Nicholas Wootton	April 13, 2015	9.53
After a hacker takes control over a neurotoxicity lab outside L.A., he uses the ventilation system to spread sarin gas throughout the facility that could kill 23 scientists trapped inside. And worse, he wants revenge for the Baghdad bombings in 1997, forcing Cabe to tell Walter his long-buried secret about the covered-up mission and the real end user for his code being the DoD and CIA who used it to kill and not help people. Ralph, wanting to prove he is a part of Scorpion, puts his life on the line to help them. Also, Richard Elia stops by to give Walter a gift for his propulsion rocket, and loans him a Ferrari Testarossa to test its engine. Eventually, Walter kicks Cabe off the team and gets in a fight with Paige as she contemplates moving her and Ralph to Portland with Drew. Walter takes a late night joyride to clear his head in Elia's Ferrari but this goes awry when he has to take evasive action to avoid hitting a coyote.
22	22	"Postcards from the Edge"	Milan Cheylov	Nick Santora & Nicholas Wootton	April 20, 2015	10.71
The rest of the team are uncertain about the future of Scorpion without Cabe or Paige and with Walter AWOL, and are not used to being leaderless. However, they are all forced to come together for their most important mission ever, which is to save Walter's life as his car gingerly balances on the edge of a cliff. In the end, Paige stays on with Scorpion, who is her real family. After Walter is stabilized in the hospital but on strong pain medication, Paige kisses him and expresses her feelings by saying she cares about him. Unfortunately, he does not hear Paige's declaration because he is heavily sedated.

=== Season 2 (2015–16) ===
No. overall	No. in season	Title	Directed by	Written by	Original release date	U.S. viewers (millions)
23	1	"Satellite of Love"	Sam Hill	Nick Santora & Nicholas Wootton	September 21, 2015	11.09
Scorpion is back in business after new Homeland Security director Adriana Molina tasks them with a case when the nuclear-powered Russian K-12 satellite is knocked out of orbit by space debris. They race to the Rocketry Aeronautics Center to divert the now-turned A-bomb's course before it detonates over Southern California. But after last year's car accident, Walter is not one hundred percent physically or mentally there due to a hand injury and post-concussion syndrome. His hidden feelings for Paige have also seemed to cloud his judgment. When problems arise on the job, they have to work extremely close together. Later, they test their theory of the team vs. their attraction with a working hypothesis of a kiss.
24	2	"Cuba Libre"	Mel Damski	Rob Pearlstein & Nick Santora	September 28, 2015	9.49
After a woman (Izabella Miko) Cabe saved in Croatia 20 years ago when she was a child pleads for his help, the team travels to Cuba for an off-the-grid mission to apprehend a Serbian war criminal who killed her family. Meanwhile, Toby gets Sylvester to confess his love for Megan by subduing his anxiety through exposure therapy. Later, not wanting to admit he was in an emotional state that led to negligence resulting in his car accident, Walter wants to plead recklessness, but may wind up in jail. However, on his lawyer's advice, Paige convinces him otherwise and he is sentenced to court-mandated community service by picking up trash in town, where he meets a new friend named Ray.
25	3	"Fish Filet"	Omar Madha	Paul Grellong & Nick Santora	October 5, 2015	9.95
In order to save the lives of three judges being targeted by a Japanese gang, Sylvester goes undercover in a federal prison to decipher the gang boss' codes. But when Molina refuses to help them get him out, Scorpion plans his escape when his life is threatened by an inmate. In order to break him out, Walter must work with Ray and his "Ray Way" of doing things by having his man on the inside smuggle drugs for Sylvester to take, appearing dead. Meanwhile, Ralph is getting bullied at school and takes matters into his own hands by becoming a celebrity on the news for getting accepted to multiple prestigious colleges. Later, Sylvester has a new lease on life after his "death" and works up the courage to tell Megan he loves her. Also, Toby overhears Happy making a date to meet a man at a club.
26	4	"Robots"	Sylvain White	David Foster & Nicholas Wootton	October 12, 2015	9.40
Happy continues to date Chet, upsetting Toby, who takes out his frustration on a punching bag. The team meets deputy director Katherine Cooper, who is now Scorpion's Homeland liaison. She tasks three members of the team, Walter, Cabe and Happy, with analyzing a "vulture" data hunter device that is attached to a communications cable 300 ft (91 m) down in international waters off the coast of California. After analyzing the vulture from a top secret U.S. Navy submarine, the vulture explodes, crippling the submarine. With limited air and no communications, Scorpion must rescue everyone on board the submarine before it self-destructs. Later, Walter proves he is not a "robot" and lets Ray stay in a trailer at the garage.
27	5	"Super Fun Guys"	Bobby Roth	Adam Higgs & Nick Santora	October 19, 2015	9.46
The team must pose as a film crew to get onto the Super Fun Guy movie set in hopes of locating a Soviet 1970s-era nuclear missile that is being sold by arms dealers on an old military base in Kazakhstan. To sneak past the armed-guards, they must disguise themselves as the film's superheroes so they can disable the warhead. Meanwhile, Megan undergoes a deep brain stimulation procedure and asks Sylvester not to tell Walter, causing Sly to work from the garage and have to sit out from partaking in his favorite comic book characters during the mission. Also, in order to forget about his affections for Happy, Toby's boxing improves and, with Cabe's help, he wants to fight in an amateur match.
28	6	"Tech, Drugs, and Rock 'n' Roll"	Sam Hill	Elizabeth Davis Beall & Nicholas Wootton	October 26, 2015	9.69
The team is ready to open the new smart building project they have been working on with Elia, but the building has been infected by a swiftly spreading worm that was uploaded onto Walter's computer by a mysterious woman he met at a tech conference mixer the night before. It is turning the now dangerous building into a burning death trap for all inside, including three children, one of whom is the head of security's son. They must work to simultaneously stop the fire and find the person responsible for planting the deadly virus.
29	7	"Crazy Train"	Jeff T. Thomas	Kevin J. Hynes & Nick Santora	November 2, 2015	9.51
With Paige and Ralph stuck on an out of control L.A. Metro subway train, the team must stop it before it derails. They discover that the runaway train's been sabotaged to clear the tracks for a heist to steal a $50 million collection of British gold coins. Walter, with sheer disregard to his personal safety, bravely jumps onto the 90 mph speeding train and successfully stops it from derailing. Paige gets scared of seeing this and due her insecurity of losing Walter, hits him. Later she apologizes to him for her juvenile behavior. Elsewhere, Toby has his first fight and gets knocked out in the boxing ring. Meanwhile, Happy seeks her own distraction from their failed relationship by going out with Chet, who is actually her comedy coach. The men then track her down at a comedy club where she totally bombs her science-based routine that only Sylvester appreciates.
30	8	"Area 51"	Carey Meyer	Kim Rome & Nicholas Wootton	November 9, 2015	9.34
A CIA agent bribes the team to search for their top-secret flagship 27B/6 plane from the CIA's new Integrity Airlines after two agents go rogue and end up in Area 51 during a routine mission. Happy creates a gamma ray spectrometer to use in the base's "cone of silence". Toby makes predictions for the future by writing down what will happen on their case in sealed envelopes that usually turn out to be correct. Happy, Toby, and Sylvester donate their portion of the $350,000 CIA money to Walter for his research funding goals towards Megan's MS. Walter plans to upload Megan's consciousness into a hard drive as a technological singularity, Transcendence-style. Later, tension grows between Walter and Sylvester when Sylvester obeys Megan's wishes and does not go forward with the aggressive treatment of intubation that Walter wants.
31	9	"US vs. UN vs. UK"	Omar Madha	Scott Sullivan & Nick Santora	November 16, 2015	9.16
The team works with MI6 to infiltrate the United Nations headquarters in New York City to stop Jonas Madaky, an ambassador/gun runner from the African nation of Buritan, from making a deal to supply militants with weapons to destroy their rebellious revolutionaries. However, things take a bad turn when the British operative turns on the team and blackmails Scorpion into helping assassinate Madaky. It appears that MI6 agent Gleason is killed and that the team decides to carry out the plan to take out Madaky. It is later revealed that Gleason is alive and Scorpion played a Houdini stunt. They orchestrate Madaky's arrest and reveal that MI6 director Olivia Cromwell was in business with Madaky, leading to her arrest, as well. On the home front, Walter gets a court order to have Megan intubated, much to Sylvester's dismay. In order to protect Megan's wishes, Sylvester makes a bold decision and gets Ray, an ordained minister of the Immaculate Church of the Internet, to marry them, making Walter accept that the situation is beyond his control.
32	10	"Arrivals and Departures"	Sam Hill	Aadrita Mukerji & Nicholas Wootton	November 23, 2015	8.95
When Walter's parents visit Megan as her condition worsens, the hospital is infected by a fatal fungus outbreak cutting Walter off from his sister and placing the whole team at risk. Thinking it is stachybotrys, the infectious disease unit searching for a cure collapse by spraying the wrong fungicide. It now falls to Scorpion to search for a cure themselves. Toby examines gold dust, a natural fungicide, on a cafeteria worker's boots and sees the man cut his leg, becoming a host to Meliola anfracta, an ancient fungus unearthed in soil. In a surprising discovery, Sylvester's OCD about using antibacterials has caused him to grow a superbacteria on his hands that is fatal to the fungus. With help from Ralph and Cabe, who the CDC keep outside, they spread the bacteria through the water standpipes and save those trapped inside. Walter reaches Megan in time to be at her side as she dies. Later, he receives an email with a video from Megan telling him that, he is more than just his brain, he is his heart and he should not be afraid to love. As a result, Walter begins to open up to his estranged parents and holds hands with Paige while sharing memories of his beloved sister.
33	11	"The Old College Try"	Christine Moore	Rob Pearlstein & Nick Santora	December 7, 2015	9.30
As the team deals with Megan's death six weeks later, they must stop a cyber terrorist, using code written by college students, who is threatening to shut down the Federal Reserve if they do not receive a quarter of a billion bitcoin in the next 72 hours. For their mission, they have to go undercover at a local university; Happy goes as a sorority pledge, Walter as a visiting drama instructor, Sylvester as a wrestling transfer student, Cabe as a campus security guard, and Toby a professor applying for a position in the Psychology Department headed by a former rival who stole his fiancée. But, in order to foil this unknown hacker, they must get into the school's server, which is a highly sophisticated quantum computer, to kill the ransomware. Meanwhile, Walter conducts an experiment to prove that Ray's firefighting partner's death was not Ray's fault by using Tuggle's tank that Cabe's friend acquired from police evidence storage. Later, Ray discovers the submerged tank in liquid glycerin which would harden any air leakage from the tank to create a bubble pattern. The test proves the tank was defective, giving Ray the peace of mind to go back into the world again, leaving Scorpion headquarters.
34	12	"Dam Breakthrough"	Adam Rodriguez	Paul Grellong & Nicholas Wootton	December 14, 2015	9.28
On Christmas Eve, Scorpion receives a mission from the DWP at the Augustine Power Station on Mount Baldy, which may go critical after a 50-foot pine tree uproots and crushes the building's wall. If the transformer gets flooded and shorts, 100,000 people will lose power on Christmas Day. After they re-boot the computer and engineer the roof, they notice a mudslide spilling into the reservoir has put a crack in the nearby dam's wall following torrential rains. Now, they have to stop the dam from breaking and wiping out the town down in the valley by repairing it. Walter deals with Megan's death by putting her ashes in a coffee can in his glove compartment and talking to himself. When Walter misplaces his pet ferret, he is so overwhelmed by the loss that his emotions finally get the best of him in front everyone; he really misses Megan. The Karmen Prize committee notifies him that he has won the $15 million grant, but he decides to launch the rocket to honor his sister.
35	13	"White Out"	Jeff Hunt	David Foster & Nick Santora	January 4, 2016	11.67
Scorpion has to survive subzero temperatures trekking to the remote McMurdo Station in Antarctica to save a U.S. Special Forces unit in Darfur that is trying to take down a genocidal warlord eviscerating border-town farming villages. The Pentagon lost contact with a low geosynchronous orbit satellite that controls a military drone used to support their operation and the team needs to reconnect it to give cover to the four-man strike team. During the mission, Toby risks his life to save Happy after she gets cut off from the rest of the team by getting lost in a whiteout blizzard. For her New Year's resolution, Happy starts reading Toby's rival Quincy Berkstead's book, Your Essential Strategies for Saying Yes to Life to be a little more positive and a little less mean and sarcastic, while Walter tries to be more social and Cabe gives up coffee to lower his blood pressure.
36	14	"Sun of a Gun"	Dwight Little	Adam Higgs	January 18, 2016	11.60
Sylvester's estranged father Ken, a retired army colonel (Jeff Fahey), enlists Scorpion's help after discovering that the mythical Sun Gun, a deadly weapon of mass destruction, is actually real and was found in an old German bunker from World War II by an African president/dictator. The team goes to a North African nation to find out if the dictator has hidden metallic sodium panels that are capable of concentrating sunlight to be launched as a satellite death ray. During the mission, Walter must use dishonesty and flattery to get up close and personal with the megalomaniacal dictator, who is smitten by his intellect. Also, in order to be more social in their daily lives, Walter and Cabe decide to go speed dating together, but they are unsuccessful.
37	15	"Da Bomb"	Steven A. Adelson	Kim Rome	January 25, 2016	10.69
The team is tasked with helping NASA find whatever alerted a possible system failure on their top-secret JC-49 rocket that is set to launch from an Air Force base. To their surprise, former Homeland Security director Merrick, who is now working for NASA, asked for Scorpion personally and begrudgingly works with them. However, the mission is threatened when Walter's date from the previous night, Linda, walks into the garage, handing him a jump drive with a recording of a scrambled voice giving them instructions to sabotage the launch or face the consequences of the bomb strapped to her chest. Meanwhile, Sylvester decides to audition for Jeopardy! in order to win enough money to buy the naming rights for the new pediatric wing at Megan's hospital so that it can be named after her, but he is nervous to be in front of the cameras.
38	16	"Fractured"	Christine Moore	Matthew Davis & Nick Santora	February 8, 2016	11.36
While Sylvester takes Ralph on an educational field trip to the beach, Paige forces Toby and Walter, who have been constantly fighting lately, into a couples therapy session specialized for business partners, but their therapist's (Penn Jillette) credentials are from online colleges and his methods are unorthodox. Cabe and Paige help to prepare Happy for a presentation of her newly designed airbag to a prospective client. Suddenly, a major 7.8-magnitude earthquake hits the L.A. area, causing significant infrastructure damage to the city including water main explosions and major fires. The team must work fast with limited resources to stop a broken gas main under Koreatown from exploding.
39	17	"Adaptation"	Sam Hill	Story by : Scott Sullivan and Aadrita Mukerji; Teleplay by : Scott Sullivan	February 22, 2016	9.87
When Mexican drug runners start to use armed drones to smuggle extremely pure bricks of heroin across the border, Scorpion is tasked by the Policía Federal Ministerial to find a way to stop them. Walter and Toby continue their therapy and Dr. Rizzuto makes them use sock puppets to express their feelings. After being rejected by Jeopardy, Sylvester memorizes product pricing in order to be on The Price Is Right. Meanwhile, Toby and Happy's private relationship becomes public, leading Walter to issue them an ultimatum based on his rule against intra-team fraternization; either they break up or one of them leaves the team.
40	18	"The Fast and the Nerdiest"	Don Tardino	Kevin J. Hynes	February 29, 2016	9.23
An old ex-con childhood friend of Cabe's, Mick Doherty (Eric Roberts), approaches the team, asking for their help in stopping a group from smuggling a biological weapon into Balio in Central America. The team manages to infiltrate the garage of a high-end vehicle import/export business and, on Toby's bet, Walter is forced to challenge one of the mechanics to a drag race in order to stall for time while Happy searches the office for incriminating paperwork. Meanwhile, Happy and Toby have begun to fight regarding Toby's increasingly frequent gambling habit, and CBS suspects Sylvester of cheating after having won $100,000 on The Price is Right in memory of Megan.
41	19	"Ticker"	Mel Damski	Rob Pearlstein	March 14, 2016	8.96
When Walter gets into a fender bender, he goes to the hospital and meets a nice little girl named Olivia who is in need of a heart transplant. However, Toby notices a patient with symptoms of the Nibori virus, a lethal disease found only in the Far East, and discovers the blood supply at Los Angeles' blood bank has been hacked, resulting in all the bags being mislabeled. Scorpion decides to help find the perpetrator in order to save Olivia's life, but they only have 4 hours until her surgery and need to find a sample of Lutheran AB negative, her incredibly rare blood type. Back at the garage, the team competes in the "ScorpiOlympics," their version of the Olympic Games that is only for geniuses testing their mental and physical abilities. Also, Sly's prize-winning days are over when he receives rejection letters from multiple game shows after winning big on The Price Is Right.
42	20	"Djibouti Call"	Omar Madha	David Foster	March 21, 2016	8.65
Scorpion is hired by the F.B.I. to install a newly developed audio surveillance system on the only U.S. military base located in Djibouti, Africa so that they can pick up on terrorist chatter. But this is just a ruse in order for Cabe and his Homeland Security trainee, Tim Armstrong (Scott Porter), to run a top secret op across the border in Makuria, gathering intel on a businessman who raids antiquities from Middle Eastern museums and sells them on the black market to fund training, fake visas, and advanced explosives for terrorists. However, it turns into a rescue mission when the team must save Cabe after he is captured behind enemy lines. Also, Sylvester hires a lawyer named Haywood "Jahelpme" Morris (Horatio Sanz) from a TV commercial to help him get past the boilerplate contracts for game show auditions.
43	21	"Twist and Shout"	Christine Moore	Paul Grellong	March 28, 2016	8.74
When a construction company that is clearing a site for a factory build unearths an ammunition belt belonging to a Marine patrol that went missing in 1971 near Pleiku, Vietnam, retired Marine John Pandova (Josh Randall) of the Defense POW/MIA Accounting Agency hires Scorpion to enhance his ground imaging technology and ground penetrating radar equipment in only two days to give him proof that the remains (including his father's) are still there. However, they only have two hours when they find themselves in the path of an F4 tornado. Later, after he receives a failing grade for his coding project, Ralph's college professor steals his sound wave software, causing him to hire Haywood as his attorney. Tim asks Walter to a meal, but is rejected as Walter is going to call Linda, who came back, to set up a date, so he takes Walter's advice on having dinner with a smart, kind, beautiful woman and asks to meet up with Paige at the diner. Linda does not return his call and it leaves Walter by himself, trying to beat Tim's high score on Proton Arnold.
44	22	"Hard Knox"	Omar Madha	Scott Sullivan	April 11, 2016	8.60
In order to test their security system, Scorpion is hired by an agent from the Department of Defense to break into Fort Knox and steal a 300-year-old Prussian scepter, proving that their depository is not run properly by a private firm. However, they discover half a pound of polonium, a toxic substance, hidden inside the artifact and must escape the buildings' traps with it intact. Elsewhere, Haywood wins his first case by helping gain more time while Ralph proves in court that the software he created was actually his by bookmarking his code data with important dates, like when he first met Walter. Also, Toby has suspicions about Linda, who he believes is less attracted to Walter than suffering from damsel syndrome, experiencing the same endorphin/dopamine rush from when he saved her. Walter breaks up with her, pledging to remain friends, while Paige accepts a date with Tim.
45	23	"Chernobyl Intentions"	Jeff T. Thomas	Nick Santora & Nicholas Wootton	April 18, 2016	8.35
Scorpion is tasked with helping Oksana Nastrova (Kathleen Munroe) of the Global Nuclear Energy Council move an improved concrete sarcophagus in place over the old deteriorating sarcophagus at the Chernobyl Nuclear Power Plant before corium trapped under the reactor destabilizes. Toby, who has diagnosed ex-Scorpion team member Mark Collins (Joshua Leonard) as insane, remains in Los Angeles for Collins' competency hearing. Scorpion discovers unmelted caesium rods near the corium using a robot designed by Happy. While Paige and Sylvester fly with Oksana in her plane over the sarcophagus, taking measurements, the robot is affected by the radiation and punctures the corium, resulting in the ejection of a radioactive cloud that disables the plane. It crashes into the old dome, trapping the plane's occupants while the team tries to save them and stop the corium from reaching the caesium rods. After returning to the United States, Walter tries to ask Paige out to a jazz festival, but decides to give her his tickets so that she can take Tim instead. Meanwhile, Toby covertly meets his jeweler in a parking garage to pick up a bespoke hex nut engagement ring for Happy, only to be kidnapped by Mark.
46	24	"Toby or Not Toby"	Sam Hill	Nick Santora & Nicholas Wootton	April 25, 2016	8.98
Scorpion has to outsmart the mentally-unstable Mark Collins, who has kidnapped Toby and intends to torture and kill him unless he receives Walter's BBI (brain–brain interface) research. But, if his demands are met, he has the ability to advance the technology to where he can read peoples' minds. When they find where Mark's hideout is through ham radio frequencies, Walter has to choose whether to capture his nemesis or let him go to disarm his elaborate booby trap—an intricate maze of dental floss holding a single jar of acid over Toby's head. After Toby's brush with death, Walter catches up to Mark and captures him on a bus going to South Carolina, the location of his favorite childhood memory. Meanwhile, Sylvester lets Toby's marriage proposal to Happy out of the bag, but she has a marriage secret of her own. Later, Walter comes to his senses about Paige, realizing he loves her. He leaves to stop her from spending the weekend with Tim at a jazz festival in Lake Tahoe.

=== Season 3 (2016–17) ===
No. overall	No. in season	Title	Directed by	Written by	Original release date	U.S. viewers (millions)
47	1	"Civil War"	Sam Hill	Nick Santora and Nicholas Wootton	October 3, 2016	8.30
After both of their personal and romantic issues fail with Paige and Happy, Walter, Toby, and the rest of Scorpion put their plans on pause as they work with the U.S. Navy to stop two out of control fighter jets taken over by hackers while flying over Los Angeles, targeting their weapons at each other. The hackers also cyberjack four U.S. destroyers and position the ships 300 yards (274 m) outside Miami, Boston, Portland, and Long Beach with high explosive BGM missiles pointed at the cities. This forces the U.S. military to ground all planes and shut down the nuclear missile silos, leaving the country defenseless. The hackers are back-traced to Bulgaria. Happy and Toby successfully help the Navy regain control of the remaining fighter plane after the hackers use it to shoot down the other. However, Walter and Paige are unsuccessful at hacking the hackers' signal and are almost killed trying. Meanwhile Sly, Cabe, and Tim travel to Sofia, Bulgaria in a Valkyrie to find the hackers, where Sly shows off his card counting skills to get the attention of a crime boss they need to find the hackers.
48	2	"More Civil War"	Jeffrey Hunt	Nick Santora and Nicholas Wootton	October 3, 2016	8.30
After Sly gains the attention of a crime boss, he must help him win back millions from a Chinese rival in exchange for the address of the hackers. The others successfully regain control over the destroyers, only to find out there is also a nuclear submarine under the hackers' control. They try to use magnets to disrupt the hackers' signal, but are mere seconds too late in implementing their solution. Cabe and Tim run into a trap, eventually managing to find the hackers' lair, but not before the hackers launch a nuclear missile. In a team effort, Walter reprograms the rocket's GPS to disable it. Meanwhile, Sly accidentally loses the game. After the crime boss finds out Sly works for the U.S. government, he decides to kill him. On the way to a secluded area, Sly escapes and is ultimately rescued by the Valkyrie pilot. Later, on Cabe's advice, Walter must face the reality that he is not emotionally ready for Paige, deciding to make amends with her and Tim.
49	3	"It Isn't the Fall That Kills You"	Sanford Bookstaver	Nick Santora and Scott Sullivan	October 10, 2016	7.05
Tech mogul Richard Elia returns to hire Scorpion to help his company with their first crewed space launch, with a deadline with NASA looming. Walter's rocket throttle design seems unstable, so he runs diagnostics on it. While working on the rocket, a lightning strike launches Walter into space. Due to several malfunctions, including low oxygen, he starts to hallucinate that Paige is with him in the rocket capsule. The team must figure out how to save Walter before his oxygen runs out in less than 30 minutes, all while dealing with the uncomfortable situation. They turn to the Russian Federal Space Agency for help in return for giving them credit for saving an American citizen. Walter and Toby devise elaborate plans to deal with their loves while at the garage.
50	4	"Little Boy Lost"	Steven A. Adelson	Rob Pearlstein and Nick Wootton	October 17, 2016	7.17
After Ralph's friend Daniel, a non-verbal autistic boy, goes missing during their school field trip, Scorpion searches for him only to find that a suspicious man took Daniel's voice tablet mistaking it for his intended dead drop. They soon discover that the tablet is linked to the S6, an international mercenary ring. The team races to track Daniel before the S6 do, but arrive too late and then must save a panicked Daniel. He reveals that he opened a file on the wrong tablet, detailing an assassination plan to use smart bullets to take out a candidate running for Senate. They work together to stop the plan, succeeding thanks to Happy's quick thinking. Toby visits Mark Collins in prison to ask him about Happy's husband and, instead of an answer, he gives Toby a riddle. Later, he finally figures out the riddle and finds out the identity of Happy's husband: Walter. Happy reveals their marriage was purely to help Walter get a green card and then reveals that she is pregnant, requesting a divorce from Walter.
51	5	"Plight at the Museum"	Christine Moore	Paul Grellong and Nick Santora	October 24, 2016	7.03
Scorpion is hired by L.A.'s Natural History Museum to determine why an ancient pillar is rapidly decaying and must stay overnight during lockdown to solve the problem. The simple mission turns complex when a group of Aldorrian thieves infiltrate the museum, wanting to steal tantalum-181 from an asteroid on display in order to enhance a nuclear bomb. Meanwhile, Toby panics about becoming a father and Paige gives him some parenting advice. Later, a hard-nosed case worker from USCIS shows up and is curious as to why Walter and Happy have been living at separate addresses for the past six years. This causes Toby to give them behavior lessons.
52	6	"Bat Poop Crazy"	Omar Madha	David Foster and Nicholas Wootton	October 31, 2016	6.51
Scorpion travels to a remote location in Wonder Rift, Arizona, where they go spelunking into a deep cave system in an effort to save a disease-ridden bat population from harming the North American ecosystem. In order to prevent the spread of White Nose Syndrome, they must aerosol fungicide into the cave after they meet up with two zoologists. They end up having to save the scientists after the bats become aggressive and attack them. Meanwhile, Happy stays at the garage running comms and has to look after a hyperactive Ralph who is on a sugar rush from eating too much candy. Later, the team throws a Halloween party and wears costumes to help Happy and Walter with their impending immigration inspection by strict agent Joyce Linehan.
53	7	"We're Gonna Need a Bigger Vote"	Sam Hill	Elizabeth Davis Beall and Nick Santora	November 7, 2016	6.92
Scorpion gets a mission directly from the U.S. President and works with the FBI on election day when hackers try to crash the voting servers in the latest U.S. presidential election. Since Walter is flagged by immigration as a person of interest for citizen fraud, he cannot help the team. Undeterred, he partners with Ralph to find out that the Chinese consulate and their ambassador are behind the vote hack as a means to gain control of international shipping lanes. Later, Paige goes with Tim to the Veterans' Ball and has to meet his parents. Meanwhile, Agent Linehan visits the garage and, although she knows Walter and Happy perpetrated a fraudulent marriage, is forced to grant Walter his citizenship after Washington, D.C. enacts a private bill as a reward for his work on the case. Happy finds out she was not pregnant, her blood test a false positive caused by contracting cadmium poisoning after working on the solar panels, but she and Toby do get properly engaged.
54	8	"Sly and the Family Stone"	Jeff Hunt	Adam Higgs and Nicholas Wootton	November 14, 2016	7.22
Most of Scorpion escorts Walter to his hometown in Ireland to help his parents with the blessing of Megan's cenotaph on Pattern Day for her one-year remembrance memorial. Toby stays at the garage to aid Happy with her chelation treatment and convince her to have a big wedding. Meanwhile, the Irish tradition is broken when Walter discovers the nearby lake is about to erupt, which would result in a poisonous gas cloud of carbon dioxide threatening the entire village. Cabe and Toby, via cell phone, try to ease the tension between Walter and Tim, who must work together to save the townsfolk. Also, Walter makes amends with his childhood bullies by fighting them, earning their respect.
55	9	"Mother Load"	Jeff T. Thomas	Kevin J. Hynes	November 21, 2016	7.07
Paige's Thanksgiving dinner for the team is put on hold when her estranged con-artist mother Veronica (Lea Thompson), posing as a real estate investor, enlists Scorpion's help after she accidentally discovers a forgotten radioactive nuclear reactor that is about to explode in an abandoned building. In addition, she is being hunted by shady businessmen who want their money back. Wanting to save his beloved Warlock's Chest comic book store from demolition, Sly starts a petition and decides to run for town alderman. Meanwhile, Cabe becomes interested in Allie Jones (Reiko Aylesworth), the competition's campaign manager. Later, Veronica, after reading Walter's good intentions, declares that he is what is best for her daughter, not Tim – and that she will help him get her back.
56	10	"This is the Pits"	Sam Hill	Kim Rome & Nicholas Wootton	December 12, 2016	6.98
Scorpion must act quickly with LAFD Fire and Rescue after a woman runs off the road to avoid a cyclist and gets trapped in her car at the bottom of the La Brea Tar Pits. Also, Sly and Cabe fail to raise enough money for Sly's campaign to run for alderman of West Altadenia, leading Veronica to teach Ralph how to make a bigger profit by selling his Forestry Brave cookies as ice cream sandwiches to hipsters and, instead of keeping the conned money, they give it to Sly as a campaign donation. Later, Walter ends his partnership with Veronica, feeling the deceit would eventually hurt Paige. Tim declines a security job offer in Amman, Jordan in order to stay with Paige and continue helping Scorpion, this time with a permanent position.
57	11	"Wreck the Halls"	Milan Cheylov	Scott Sullivan	December 19, 2016	7.53
Scorpion spends Christmas Eve at a cabin free of all electronic devices, cell reception, and Wi-Fi. But it is not a team holiday without a problem. While out searching for a Christmas tree to cut down, they encounter gunrunners in the woods holding an ATF agent hostage. The team is discovered at their retreat and sets up homemade traps to take down the criminals. Even though their plan works, the agent is really a part of the gunrunning gang and captures Ralph. Paige and Walter race after him and rescue Ralph. Later, Tim and Walter have a heated argument over Paige, causing Tim to rethink his position as a full-time member of Scorpion. In the end, he decides to take the security job in Amman, but Toby tells Walter that Paige will blame Walter for it.
58	12	"Ice Ca-Cabes"	Jeff T. Thomas	David Foster & Nick Santora	January 2, 2017	7.37
Scorpion is back to normal with the regular roster after Tim's departure, but Paige is upset about how Walter handled the situation and just wants to focus on work. Meanwhile, Cabe is moving out of Happy's home and she is actually sad about it; he gives her his mother's brooch to wear on her wedding day and she considers him a friend. The team's routine mission at the Federal Pumping Station in Redwood, California in the desert turns into their hardest case when they are forced to freeze Cabe's body in order to save his life after he is seriously wounded by a copper shard that snapped off from the force of the turbine's friction. The team must collect various materials, forcing Sly and Happy to face their fears and Paige and Walter to enter a nudist spring. Later, at the hospital, Walter finally expresses his feelings for his long-time fatherly friend and tells Cabe he loves him.
59	13	"Faux Money Maux Problems"	Omar Madha	Aadrita Mukerji & Nicholas Wootton	January 16, 2017	7.81
Scorpion takes a private job revamping a winery's viticulture technology with selective harvesters and optical sorters. On the way to the winery in a limousine, the team is knocked out by kevloturane, a subtle but potentially lethal gas. They are tricked by a foreign diplomat posing as the vineyard owner, and she forces them to make American counterfeit money for her country, the fictional Norteguay of which her brother is dictator, that intends to ruin the U.S. economy. After being locked in a warehouse with her mother, Paige has to rely on her mother's con-artist skills to save them all. Meanwhile, at the winery, Toby and Happy are followed by a Norteguaian henchman and escape to the garage to help the rest of the team, who believe they are out of the country but are really in Simi Valley, California.
60	14	"The Hole Truth"	Sam Hill	Story by : Matthew David & Rob Pearlstein; Teleplay by : Rob Pearlstein	January 23, 2017	7.77
Scorpion is hired by the US Army Corps of Engineers to help a sandhog unit locate a leak in a municipal water line. The micro leaks they find cause the soft soil to create a massive sinkhole that is ready to swallow up a silo filled with chemicals, along with a worker trapped on top of it. If this happens, the drinking water supply of one of Southern California's most prominent aquifers will be tainted. Meanwhile, Toby and Happy have to help Walter, who is slipping down their "EQ" scale, as he has been too sharp and insensitive to people's emotions ever since Paige decided to leave him to his own devices. Paige also has to help Veronica get back the con money she buried at the abandoned factory where they found the nuclear device, which is now being worked on by a demolition crew. She devises a cunning plan for her mother to cheat the men who want her to pay for her sins; however, it forces Veronica to part ways with Paige for good. She leaves a large cache of her dirty money to Paige in Ralph's name.
61	15	"Sharknerdo"	Tim Story	Elizabeth Davis Beall	February 6, 2017	7.76
After Scorpion loses a contract with the Department of Energy to upgrade their server when Walter disagrees with a rep over their "mathematically inaccurate" fee, he takes on a case to use their echolocation tech in search of pirate treasure. The team is hired by a Marine salvage company that believes they've found the San Caldera, a Manila galleon that sunk by Drakes Bay in 1595 carrying a fortune in gold. Meanwhile, Allie helps Sly out with his campaign by getting him an interview with a teenage reporter for the West Altadena Shopper. However, he has more important matters to attend to when he has to help rescue Walter and Paige when they're stranded in the middle of the Pacific Ocean after their boat explodes from an electrical problem. Even though they're able to make it to a Danish buoy to get out an S.O.S., a frenzy of sharks surrounds them.
62	16	"Keep It In Check, Mate"	Christine Moore	Kim Rome	February 13, 2017	7.24
Scorpion gets a case from the Eastern European Desk of the CIA when two informants in Sardovia are murdered. In order to get close to a Sardovian asset, Walter and Sylvester enter an international chess competition undercover in an effort to extricate the spy/chess grandmaster before her identity is exposed by code breakers. Meanwhile, Cabe works with the FBI to convince Happy's father Patrick to testify against Sonny Dubin, a man who ran a stolen car ring to move drugs across the border for whom Patrick used to illegally wipe off VIN numbers of vehicles that he brought him at his garage. In order to take advantage of the deal Cabe has struck, he has to self-surrender and will be imprisoned for two years, causing Happy heartbreak. Later, Ralph is asked to the Valentine's Day dance by two girls and goes to the men for advice instead of Paige, who is disappointed since emotional problems are her specialty. However, he comes to her wanting to learn how to dance.
63	17	"Dirty Seeds, Done Dirt Cheap"	Jeff T. Thomas	Adam Higgs	February 20, 2017	7.19
Scorpion travels to Greenland for a simple job, repairing a malfunctioning system at the Granse World Seed Vault. When they become trapped in high humidity rooms, Happy, Sylvester, and Cabe have life-threatening psychotic hallucinations due to ergot spores, which affect the fear center of the brain. Happy relives her childhood rejections waiting to be adopted, Sly believes he will catch a disease from chickens, and Cabe believes he is too old to date Allie, who is 15 years his junior, and turns into an arthritic old man. Meanwhile, Paige, Walter, and Toby, who are not infected, try to help them overcome their worst fears over their comms. Later, Sly must overcome his fear of public speaking to win a political debate against his opponent, who tries to use a bullying tactic on him.
64	18	"Don't Burst My Bubble"	Omar Madha	April E. Brassard & Nicholas Wootton	February 27, 2017	6.88
When Happy's new online friend Ada, a teenage girl she met on a website for female mechanics, doesn't respond to a private chat, Happy heads to Ada's hometown of Lancaster. She enlists Scorpion to help her move Ada, who has a severe immunodeficiency brought on by aplastic anemia, and the sterile bubble that protects her weak immune system to a germ-free location after a severe storm leaves her home surrounded by dangerous debris. Meanwhile, Walter tries out his newfound emotional state on Paige when she and Tim break up after he decides to accept an eight-month contract extension in Jordan. Later, Sly loses the alderman election after Allie's boss and Sly's opponent forces her to post a photo on the internet of the germophobic Sly shaking hands with a veteran and wiping his hand afterwards. This causes Cabe to break up with Allie, although Sly nonetheless manages to save the Warlock's Chest from being condemned by qualifying it as a historical landmark. Also, the team holds a Winter Formal and uses a virtual reality headset designed by Walter to allow Ada to experience the dance.
65	19	"Monkey See, Monkey Poo"	Don Tardino	Scott Sullivan	March 13, 2017	6.61
Scorpion works with the World Health Organization to stop the dangerous Marari virus from spreading throughout South America and causing a pandemic. They travel to the Amazon rainforest to locate an endangered monkey species called the Homboldt Capuchin that may have the antibody for the cure. Meanwhile, in order for their marriage to work, Happy wants to express herself better, so she drags Toby to see "quack" therapist Dr. Cecil Rizzuto (Penn Jillette) for premarital counseling. Later, Walter identifies with Cabe's emotional pain from losing Allie after his own heartbreak over Paige and actually shows some empathy towards him.
66	20	"Broken Wind"	Steven A. Adelson	Caitlin Duffy & Nick Santora	March 20, 2017	6.46
Scorpion is hired by the Department of Energy to design a special graphene alloy turbine to upgrade their experimental blade-less windmills at a wind farm in Energy Valley. When Happy and Paige get stuck in a gondola, the rest of the team races to save them after the cable supporting it snaps. The men make it hard for Toby to decide on a best man for his wedding, resulting in him asking Paige to be his "best ma'am." To avoid a similar competition, Happy declares them all her "dudes of honor." Additionally, Sly earns the Stone of Valor at The Knights of Altadenia vesting ceremony and wants a reluctant Cabe to join in being knighted into his clan after his contributions towards saving The Warlock's Chest.
67	21	"Rock Block"	Antonio Negret	David Foster	April 10, 2017	6.40
Scorpion is hired by the government of the fictional Hechnyan Republic to retrieve a space capsule carrying an asteroid, but discover it contains DNA strands that may have deadly pathogens capable of killing millions. During the mission, Allie visits Cabe, who stayed behind, to inform him that her boss will be stripped from his position as alderman for accepting bribes and that Sylvester will be able to take his place. Sly initially rejects the offer, instead offering Cabe a trade; he will take the oath of office only if Cabe takes Allie to dinner. Happy and Toby secretly take advantage of freebies from reception venues while Paige struggles with her "best ma'am" duties. When she discovers their secret, they offer her a bribe from their haul. Later, things heat up for Walter and Paige when they see if the song Walter picked out for the wedding is suitable for dancing.
68	22	"Strife on Mars"	Jeff Hunt	Kevin J. Hynes	April 17, 2017	6.59
Scorpion is hired by Kapper Aerospace Industries in Solvang to fix the thorium power grid in their Mars simulation biodome. When a critical system fails, they must extract a pair of scientists who have been living inside for 11 months. Also, Walter and Paige plan out their own versions of Toby and Happy's Jack and Jill Bachelor/Bachelorette Party: Walter with a trip to the science center, a planetarium, and the natural history museum, Paige with a party bus and look-a-like piñatas. Meanwhile, the couple prepares to move in with each other, quickly learning that they have different styles and ways of living. An oxygen-ozone mix in the dome triggers Walter's memory of the earlier rocket mission and he discovers what really happened in space with Paige. Later, realizing Paige played him, Walter fires Paige at Scorpion but does so only after landing a position for her with Richard Elia; Paige however tells him to "go to hell" and leaves with Ralph.
69	23	"Something Burrowed, Something Blew"	Christine Moore	Aadrita Mukerji & Nick Santora	May 1, 2017	7.11
On the day of Happy and Toby's wedding, Scorpion gets a case in Wyoming when lightning strikes set fire to an underground coal mine. They must extinguish the fire before it destroys a telecom cable, but they need to be back in San Jose, California in time for the ceremony. When complications arise and they don't make it, Paige plans an impromptu wedding at Kovalsky's Diner, their favorite greasy spoon, and gets Ray, who's an ordained minister, to give the vows. Walter expresses his feelings for Paige, stating the reason he fired her is because he's in love with her. To his surprise, she feels the same way and they share a not-so-intimate moment. Later, Cabe gets a call; the French Polynesian governor needs help setting up their underwater wave-powered generators and they're willing to fly the team out to Tahiti. Looks like the newlyweds get a free honeymoon. However, on the private flight, they hit some turbulence and, with Happy as the co-pilot, the plane starts to go down.
70	24	"Maroon 8"	Milan Cheylov	Paul Grellong	May 8, 2017	7.52
On the way to Tahiti, the team's plane crashes on a deserted island after a battery in one of the wave-powered generators explodes, causing shrapnel to cut the plane's hydraulic lines. Everyone except for the pilot, Scotty (Rockmond Dunbar), is unharmed. Scotty is suffering from crush syndrome and will die if freed. The team rushes to build a makeshift dialysis machine out of the wreckage to save him, while also trying to find a way off the island. In the meantime, Sylvester's near-death experience instills him with a new surge of confidence and Toby learns some surprising secrets about Happy's past. They found the old Japanese bunker from the Pacific War in World War II, as Sylvester will try to translate to Japanese language on the old Japanese radio. Also, an overeager Walter struggles with his emotions while adjusting to his new relationship with Paige and Ralph is worried the relationship won't survive long on the island.
71	25	"Scorp Family Robinson"	Sam Hill	Nick Santora & Nicholas Wootton	May 15, 2017	7.89
Three weeks after crashing on a deserted island, the team is divided on plans to get rescued before the monsoon season, so the team splits up. Walter thinks a magnetic field change can get them home, while Toby tries to make a raft out of newly discovered oil drums. Meanwhile, a long-bearded Sylvester is losing his mind in the bunker with his pet chameleon. Everyone works together to rescue Ralph and Scotty when they are smothered in a sand pit created by an exploding copper wire experiment that results in an electrical disturbance, signalling a plane to fly above them. They spell out SOS on the sand and are saved. Back home safe, Paige and Walter are finally left alone and they consummate their relationship.

=== Season 4 (2017–18) ===
No. overall	No. in season	Title	Directed by	Written by	Original release date	U.S. viewers (millions)
72	1	"Extinction"	Sam Hill	Nick Santora & Nicholas Wootton	September 25, 2017	5.75
Walter gets a call from ex-Scorpion member and old nemesis Mark Collins. While in prison, Mark discovered an extinction event from a temperature shift in Northern Norway. In order to prevent mass extinction, the team has to work with the mad genius to stop methane from leaking through cracks in the ice caused by an earthquake. However, methane geysers are created during an aftershock and, if not plugged up, will start warming the earth's atmosphere within hours instead of weeks. During the mission, Walter and Paige awkwardly resume their new relationship at work, causing Walter to burst out into song and dance. Also, Sly questions his lack of achievements after seeing his short obituary in a shrine dedicated to him at the Warlock's Chest.
73	2	"More Extinction"	Sam Hill	Nick Santora & Nicholas Wootton	October 2, 2017	5.23
With the new Homeland Security director refusing to help, Team Scorpion and Mark Collins are forced to come up with a plan to save the world on their own. After learning of a nearby luxury resort for Russian military higher-ups, the team decides to raid it for an experimental assault helicopter and the supplies they need to perform cloud seeding with the intention to cause it to snow and freeze over the crevices. Despite some issues, the team succeeds in stealing the necessary supplies and successfully freezes over the methane hotspots, buying the needed time for specialists to come with methane-eating bacteria to remove the threat completely. However, Collins tricks Cabe and is able to escape. In the aftermath, the team comes to realize that Collins had planned all along to use the extinction event to escape and Cabe is arrested for instigating Collins' escape. Walter and Paige, after experiencing doubts about their relationship, reconcile and Happy, revealing she recovered his old wedding ring earlier, makes Sly a wedding ring of bandage fragments within a plastic mold.
74	3	"Grow a Deer, A Female Deer"	Milan Cheylov	David Foster & Nick Santora	October 9, 2017	4.82
After learning of Cabe's arrest from Ally, Scorpion pools their funds to pay his $500,000 bail, angering Cabe. Now in desperate need of funds, Scorpion agrees to fly to Africa to stop a poacher cabal from targeting rhinos. During the mission, Walter's guilt causes him to channel Cabe's mannerisms to nearly disastrous effect. After locating the correct valley, Scorpion rescues a deer from a poacher. The deer, which is of a nearly-extinct species, is severely injured and pregnant. The team is forced to move the baby into an artificial womb and to transport both mother and baby to safety while chased by poachers. The team succeeds in saving both mother and child while Ralph is able to decrypt the satellite phone of one of the poachers, identifying the entire organization. With the help of Ralph, Cabe realizes how selfish he's being, while Ralph develops a crush on Sly's new intern, Patty.
75	4	"Nuke Kids on the Block"	Elodie Keene	Paul Grellong & Nicholas Wootton	October 16, 2017	4.84
Scorpion is called in to decommission a nuclear missile, but Happy accidentally drops a wrench and punctures the missile's fuel tank. With four hours until help arrives and the fuel vapors threatening to cause the warhead to detonate, Scorpion comes up with a plan to use a 3D printer and neon gas to create a plug for the leak. A mistake in the gas they receive causes the situation to worsen, so Walter decides to use an explosion to harmlessly launch the warhead into the countryside, where it can safely be recovered later. While the launch is successful, the vapors arm the warhead. At the last second, Happy disarms it and Scorpion leaves the Air Force to clean up the mess. At the same time, Sly's new intern Patty struggles to save the local science club. Sly finds a way to save the city plenty of money to fund the science club. Happy announces that she wants to have a baby with Toby, while Walter admits his insecurities about Paige growing bored with their relationship.
76	5	"Sci Hard"	Dwight H. Little	Rob Pearlstein & Nick Santora	October 23, 2017	5.15
Walter, Paige, Cabe, Toby, and Happy visit a technology conference in Los Angeles while Sly takes the Vermont bar exam. While at the conference, which features Scorpion's old acquaintance Richard Elia, the conference is taken over by masked men, resulting in Paige and Walter being taken hostage. As the others try to foil a clever bank robbery scheme, Sly is forced to interrupt his test to help, observed by his test proctor to monitor for possible cheating. Cabe is able to overpower two of the villains and aid Walter and Sly in tricking the remaining two into thinking they have gotten their money. However, Toby and Happy's attempt to help gets them arrested by a suspicious police detective. In the end, Cabe captures the robbers and Toby and Happy are exonerated. Sly's efforts to help results in his only answering about seventy percent of the questions before running out of time. To Sly's shock, he later finds out that the sympathetic proctor rushed his test results through and he passed, meaning that Sly can act as Cabe's lawyer in his upcoming trial.
77	6	"Queen Scary"	Omar Madha	Adam Higgs & Nicholas Wootton	October 30, 2017	4.93
The team meets Dave who offers them a job to prove the existence of ghosts on the Queen Mary for his documentary. Due to the financial problems that the team currently have, they accepted the job though Walter stays behind due to his skepticism. During the mission, the team discovers that the Queen Mary is being used to house an antenna guiding uncrewed ships. Due to a malfunction, one such ship ends up a disastrous collision course with a refinery and the team's attempts to stop it make the situation worse. Finally, Walter manages to board the ship, but is unable to stop it directly due to its damaged electronics. Instead, the team manages to use the ship's sonar and the Queen Mary's PA system to create a sonic wall that stops the ship feet from the refinery. Though the ghosts were debunked, Dave still produces a heavily edited version of the documentary. At the end of the episode, Toby manages to get Cabe to open up about his upcoming trial and Cabe finally admits that he's worried.
78	7	"Go With the Flo(rence)"	Sam Hill	Kevin J. Hynes & Nick Santora	November 6, 2017	5.18
While tracking a device that can prevent a nuclear meltdown through the Los Angeles sewers, Walter learns the nuances of listening and not offering advice to Paige. Also, Team Scorpion meets Florence, their new neighbor at the garage, after she sends a mix of smelly chemicals through their shared ventilation as a warning to keep the noise down,
79	8	"Faire is Foul"	Sanford Bookstaver	Scott Sullivan	November 13, 2017	4.74
For Sylvester's birthday, Team Scorpion visits a renaissance festival, but the revelry is cut short when a group tries to rob a nearby police evidence locker. Also, Paige grows weary of Walter's play-by-play of all the festival's historical inaccuracies.
80	9	"It's Raining Men (of War)"	Antonio Negret	Kim Rome & Nicholas Wootton	November 20, 2017	5.13
The team is hired to dissolve a garbage island made out of plastic. They are helped by their new neighbor Flo, a chemist, who devises a formula that dissolves plastic. Walter, Flo and Happy walk onto the floating garbage to disperse the formula. While the formula starts dissolving the island, it appears that it attracts deadly jellyfish. Meanwhile, their boat has engine problems and drifts away. The team uses their combined intellect to get back to the boat. Walter and Flo get stung by the jellyfish and need medical attention.
81	10	"Crime Every Mountain"	Sam Hill	Aadrita Mukerji & Nick Santora	November 27, 2017	5.50
While testing a new winch, Scorpion witnesses a plane go down and attempts to help the man flying the plane save his children. The team learns too late that the man and his daughter are drug runners and get taken captive, ultimately resulting in Walter and Paige being trapped in a small cave. Toby manages to rescue the two and they are able to outfox and capture the pair. The incident causes Happy to experience some doubts about having children after seeing the criminal family, but she is soothed by Toby. At the same time, Cabe attempts to capture Mark Collins with Sly's help after they receive a lead. However, it is just a trap set by Collins to frame Cabe for taking a $50,000 bribe. With Cabe's situation worsening, Walter attempts to distance himself from Cabe, leading to some strain between him and Paige. In the end, Sly decides to request a bench trial instead of a jury trial so that Cabe's guilt will only be determined by an experienced judge. While helping prepare for the trial, Walter reconciles with Cabe.
82	11	"Who Let the Dog Out ('Cause Now It's Stuck In a Cistern)"	Omar Madha	David Foster & Nick Santora	December 11, 2017	5.92
Joined by Florence and a new handler from Homeland Security, Scorpion sets out to rescue a diabetic dog trapped underground with only a short time to live. The team manages to save the dog and their handler decides to report to Homeland Security that the team is unconventionally effective, giving his support in allowing the team to continue to operate. At the same time, Cabe goes on trial for aiding and abetting Mark Collins' escape and taking a bribe. Cabe's trial is a bench trial overseen by a judge with a history of handing down harsh sentences. The judge rejects most of Sly's defenses, making it seem like Cabe will be convicted. However, Sly has a last minute idea using an obscure case from 1804 and maritime law. Ultimately, the judge dismisses the bribery charges based on evidence presented by Sly of Collins' bank hacking to frame Cabe. Based on maritime law, Cabe is exonerated of helping Collins escape and is released. At the end of the episode, Sly helps Toby and Florence deal with charges of their own relating to helping him save Cabe and Cabe gives each member of the team a memento with personal value to show their importance to him.
83	12	"A Christmas Car-Roll"	LeVar Burton	Paul Grellong & Nicholas Wootton	December 18, 2017	5.35
While the rest of Scorpion plans to enjoy the Christmas holiday, Walter continues to work, resulting in a life-threatening fall. While Scorpion attempts to save Walter, his unconscious self experiences a dream world where Scorpion was never formed. As a result, several of the disasters they prevented have happened. In Walter's dream, he is married to Florence, Paige owns a chain of restaurants, Cabe is Chief of the LAPD, Sly owns a video game company, Toby is a famous motivational speaker, Happy runs a podcast on rare cars, and Ralph is his former silent genius self. In order to save himself, represented by a doppelganger of Walter trapped after a car accident, Walter is forced to bring the team together. Scorpion is able to save Walter's life and he awakens in a hospital in the real world. The dream gives Walter a new perspective on the team and his dream marriage to Florence intrigues him.
84	13	"The Bunker Games"	Milan Cheylov	Rob Pearlstein	January 15, 2018	5.62
Scorpion is hired to check out the AI system in a doomsday bunker. Due to Cabe's upcoming physical, Paige remains behind to help him train while Toby is barred from the job by the owners. To the team's surprise, they are greeted by Toby's rival Quincy Berkstead and his wife Amy, who is Toby's ex-fiancée. When Toby follows the rest of the team out of suspicion, the bunker's AI Dorie labels Toby as a threat and locks the team, Quincy, and Amy in the bunker while Cabe and Paige try desperately to save them. With time running out until Dorie releases a deadly gas, the team implements a plan that releases them from the bunker and locks Dorie in an unsolvable challenge. During the mission, Happy grows jealous of Amy, who appears to be more beautiful and successful than her, but the two bond. Quincy's cowardice causes Amy to leave him in the end. At the same time, Walter remains freaked out by his dream about being married to Florence and attempts to maintain his distance from her on the mission. While Florence takes the news well when Walter explains, Paige does not.
85	14	"Lighthouse of the Rising Sun"	Sam Hill	Adam Higgs	January 22, 2018	5.23
After a solar flare knocks out power and communications in Southern California, Scorpion, Ralph, Cabe's girlfriend Allie, Sly's intern Patty, and Sly's science club team up to save two teenagers trapped on a plane with no way of landing. Cabe, Allie, Toby, and Happy reactivate the lighthouse both couples went to for a romantic weekend away to help guide the teenagers in while Paige and Sly break into a flight school to get the plane's specifications. However, the plane suffers damage and is unable to land and a controlled crash-landing proves to be impossible as well. With the help of the science club, Walter comes up with a plan for the teens to jump into a massive net, saving their lives. During the crisis, Cabe encourages the teens to admit their love for each other while he finally does the same with Allie, who reciprocates his feelings. Throughout the crisis, Ralph continues his efforts to impress Patty and succeeds to the point that she requests his help in running Sly's reelection campaign. Due to Walter's dream, Paige is harsh with Florence while giving her advice to get investors. Paige's advice works and Paige makes amends with Florence and Walter, though a planned romantic night suffers an unfortunate interruption.
86	15	"Wave Goodbye"	Jeff T. Thomas	Kevin J. Hynes	January 29, 2018	5.82
Scorpion is called to Fuente Roja, Mexico to repair a nuclear power reactor that was damaged by an earthquake. Sly stays behind to get an autograph from his favorite author. As the team prepares to repair the reactor, another earthquake at sea triggers a massive tsunami that threatens the town. Able to effect repairs but unable to leave the town in time, Scorpion enacts a plan to dissipate the tsunami before it can reach land and the remaining townspeople. At the same time, Toby's ex-fiancée Amy asks him to help her recover her identity which was previously stolen and sold. Toby tracks Amy's stolen identity to his old enemy, the Gooch. Though Toby offers to return to gambling to help Amy, the Gooch tries to kill them. Happy learns of Toby's actions and arrives in time with Cabe and the police to arrest the Gooch and save the two. Though Sly misses meeting his favorite author, Cabe is able to arrange a private meeting for him at the garage.
87	16	"Nerd, Wind and Fire"	Bethany Rooney	Scott Sullivan	February 5, 2018	5.55
On Valentine's Day, Scorpion gets called in to rescue a doctor and a pilot whose helicopter crashed into an incomplete building due to powerful winds. The doctor is needed by a critically-injured patient who will soon die if the doctor can't reach him. As Toby struggles to keep the young man alive, Walter uses equipment from the hospital to create a makeshift zipline to reach the helicopter, but faces problems during the rescue itself. With the team's help, the doctor and the pilot are saved. However, facing mortal danger, Walter must jump off the building to survive. Meanwhile, Toby and Happy await the results of their fertility tests. Toby is discovered to have sertoli cell-only syndrome. The couple can't afford the treatment, so Scorpion and Ally pool their resources to help. Ralph is asked by Patty to tutor her crush, something he tries to sabotage until Walter gives him advice. From Paige, Florence learns of Walter's dream and assures her she has no romantic interest in him. Instead, Sly and Florence appear to develop feelings for each other. Paige finds Walter's unfinished song to her.
88	17	"Dumbster Fire"	Sanford Bookstaver	Aadrita Mukerji	February 26, 2018	5.06
Scorpion is called in to verify a potentially major discovery. However, the lab is so deep underground that spending over four hours causes the pressure to damage the team's IQ. Due to a prairie dog mishap and Walter's inability to properly fix it in his altered state, the lab's particle collider threatens to create a black hole and the team lacks the smarts to fix it. Guided by Paige and Cabe, they are able to come up with simpler solutions to some of their problems. After Toby collapses due to the pressure, an effort to save his life by creating a makeshift vacuum restores Toby's intelligence and he is able to come up with a solution to the problem. In the aftermath, Toby and Happy finally agree on a doctor for their fertility problems and Sly comes up with a new water filter to reduce the amount of plastic used, enlisting Florence's help to perfect it. Though the low-IQ Walter resulted in him having a higher EQ, Walter returns completely to normal and rejects Paige's attempts to go on a date with him based on the things he suggested while dumb. Instead, Walter and Florence spend the night in the lab using their complementary geniuses to solve a problem.
89	18	"Dork Day Afternoon"	Steven A. Adelson	Paul Grellong	March 5, 2018	5.51
During a rush to get Toby's sperm to a fertility clinic to get Happy pregnant through artificial insemination, Walt chooses to stop at a bank, incidentally getting him and Toby trapped in the middle of a bank robbery. With the robbers unaware of Walt and Toby having hidden coms, the two work with the rest of Scorpion and Florence to foil the robbery. An attempt to get Toby's sperm sample to the clinic before it loses viability results in it becoming stuck in the bank's old pneumatic tube system. The team is able to come up with a plan to stun the robbers which will also free the sample. Meanwhile, Walt falls into danger when he is caught by the lead robber. The plan works, stunning the leader long enough for Walt to subdue him. The robbers are arrested and the LAPD provides a police escort to the clinic, allowing the sperm sample to arrive in time. An attempt by Sly to ask out Florence fails due to miscommunication, while Walt shares a family dinner with Paige and Ralph and afterwards chooses to forego work in favor of spending time with Ralph.
90	19	"Gator Done"	Omar Madha	Kim Rome	March 19, 2018	4.82
Scorpion is called to a bayou in New Orleans, Louisiana, where a new mosquito-borne virus is threatening to become an epidemic. Scorpion's mission is to spread genetically-engineered, sterile mosquitoes to curtail the local population of infectious mosquitos, thwarting the disaster. However, things go wrong when Toby's antics cause the container to be swallowed by an alligator. An attempt to retrieve it leads to Cabe being hit instead. Toby is able to get help for Cabe in time, realising how dangerous his immaturity is with a baby potentially on the way. Walt and Paige eventually succeed in retrieving the container and releasing the mosquitoes. Meanwhile, Sly's intern Patty Logan gets her first tardy ever due to bullying. Sly and Ralph attempt to help, leading to Sly having a breakdown in the principal's office. The principal finally agrees to remove the tardy from Patty's record. Throughout these events, Paige attempts to teach Walt the concept of a white lie. After discovering Paige's hatred of a lecture Walter invited her to attend with him, he lies to spare Paige and goes with Florence instead.
91	20	"Foul Balls"	Nick Santora	David Foster & Nick Santora	March 26, 2018	4.84
Director Carson demands that Scorpion play in a softball game against the Homeland Security team led by Carson, with the team's future as government contractors at stake. With no other choice, Scorpion, Ralph, Florence, Patty Logan, one of Sly's friends from the Warlock's Chest, and Cecil form a softball team that does badly at first until the team begins using science to stretch the rules and increase their odds. At the same time, Walt and Cabe get trapped in an evidence locker and Walt is forced to admit to a childhood trauma that makes him reluctant to play sports in front of Cabe. Toby and Happy learn of Walt and Florence's night out and become suspicious. After a failed attempt to get help from pro player Kyle Dirk, Walt and Cabe return in time to win the game and save Scorpion's contract, bringing the team closer in the process.
92	21	"Kenny and the Jet"	Jeff T. Thomas	Adams Higgs & Rob Pearlstein	April 9, 2018	5.44
On the way back from Hawaii after pitching Sly's new water filter to the military, Cabe notices the air marshal growing nervous and discovers that she suspects a bomb on the plane. Using a passenger's fishfinder as a makeshift x-ray device, the team discovers that a young boy, Kenny, stowed away in the wheel well to follow his father after his recently-divorced parents moved him to Hawaii. With Kenny in serious danger in the unpressurized wheel well, the team and Ralph work together to save him, but suffer complications, including an engine fire that causes the plane to have to fly on a single engine. An attempt to rescue Kenny through a makeshift airlock fails and results in Paige getting trapped as well. Paige risks her life to keep Kenny safe until the plane makes a bumpy landing; Kenny is taken to the hospital and expected to make a full recovery. During the episode, Happy acts recklessly following the failure of her first attempt to get pregnant, but agrees to moderate herself after a talk with Toby. Walt considers telling Paige the truth about his night out with Florence, but ultimately chooses against it. However, Paige realizes that Walter is lying to her about something. Ralph and Paige experience conflict over Ralph's interest in Patty Logan, culminating in Ralph asking out Patty. However, Patty kindly rejects Ralph due to their age difference, leaving them with too many hurdles to have a relationship; Paige spends the night consoling her son. At the end, Sly learns that the military has decided to buy his water filter and, with Cabe's help, gains the courage to finally ask out Florence.
93	22	"A Lie in the Sand"	Sam Hill	Paul Grellong & Scott Sullivan	April 16, 2018	5.22
Scorpion is called to Africa by Sly's pen pal to help save his village elder, the only hope for peace talks with militants. The elder is in heart failure and the only way to bring needed fuel is through a minefield. An attempt to bring the fuel through the minefield during a sandstorm places Walter and Happy in danger, but they ultimately succeed. At the same time, Toby discovers that the elder has been misdiagnosed and fights against a reluctant doctor's beliefs to save the elder's life using bloodletting. Toby succeeds in keeping the elder alive long enough for the fuel to arrive and saves the peace talks. Their experiences in Africa cause Toby and Happy to reconsider their options for having children and they decide on adoption. Paige discovers Walter's lie about taking Florence to the lecture and Scorpion has a major blowout, compounded by the fact that Florence admits to having fallen in love with Walter, leaving Sly heartbroken. Paige breaks up with Walter and most of the team quits. Two weeks later, Scorpion 2.0 has been reduced to Walter, Cabe, and Florence while Paige, Sly, Happy, and Toby have formed Centipede, their own rival team in direct competition with Scorpion; Paige refuses to hear out Walter.

== Ratings ==
=== Season 1 ===
Viewership and ratings per episode of List of Scorpion episodes
No.	Title	Air date	Rating/share (18–49)	Viewers (millions)	DVR (18–49)	DVR viewers (millions)	Total (18–49)	Total viewers (millions)
1	"Pilot"	September 22, 2014	3.2/9	13.83	1.8	5.32	5.0	19.22
2	"Single Point of Failure"	September 29, 2014	3.1/8	13.36	1.5	4.56	4.6	17.94
3	"A Cyclone"	October 6, 2014	2.6/7	12.05	1.3	4.49	3.9	16.54
4	"Shorthanded"	October 13, 2014	2.4/6	11.51	1.2	4.18	3.6	15.69
5	"Plutonium Is Forever"	October 20, 2014	2.4/6	10.75	1.4	4.24	3.8	14.99
6	"True Colors"	October 27, 2014	2.3/6	10.39	1.3	4.25	3.6	14.64
7	"Father's Day"	November 3, 2014	2.2/6	10.34	1.3	4.85	3.5	15.20
8	"Risky Business"	November 10, 2014	2.0/6	10.08	1.3	4.64	3.3	14.72
9	"Rogue Element"	November 17, 2014	2.0/5	10.17	1.3	4.22	3.3	14.39
10	"Talismans"	November 24, 2014	1.9/5	9.28	1.1	4.00	3.1	13.42
11	"Revenge"	December 8, 2014	2.1/6	10.00	1.4	4.47	3.5	14.47
12	"Dominoes"	December 15, 2014	2.0/6	10.07	1.3	4.08	3.3	14.15
13	"Kill Screen"	January 5, 2015	2.4/7	12.32	1.4	4.35	3.8	16.67
14	"Charades"	January 18, 2015	3.2/10	12.29	1.0	3.10	4.2	15.39
15	"Forget Me Nots"	January 19, 2015	2.3/6	12.08	1.2	4.14	3.5	16.22
16	"Love Boat"	February 9, 2015	2.3/6	11.86	1.2	4.09	3.5	15.95
17	"Going South"	February 23, 2015	2.1/6	10.69	1.3	4.49	3.4	15.18
18	"Once Bitten, Twice Die"	March 9, 2015	2.0/6	10.59	1.3	4.06	3.3	14.65
19	"Young Hearts Spark Fire"	March 23, 2015	2.1/6	9.70	1.1	4.25	3.2	13.96
20	"Crossroads"	March 30, 2015	2.0/6	9.38	1.0	3.90	3.0	13.28
21	"Cliffhanger"	April 13, 2015	1.9/6	9.53	1.2	4.46	3.1	13.99
22	"Postcards from the Edge"	April 20, 2015	2.2/6	10.71	1.1	3.87	3.3	14.58

=== Season 2 ===
Viewership and ratings per episode of List of Scorpion episodes
No.	Title	Air date	Rating/share (18–49)	Viewers (millions)	DVR (18–49)	DVR viewers (millions)	Total (18–49)	Total viewers (millions)
1	"Satellite of Love"	September 21, 2015	2.2/7	11.09	1.1	4.04	3.3	15.13
2	"Cuba Libre"	September 28, 2015	1.7/5	9.49	1.2	4.33	2.9	13.82
3	"Fish Filet"	October 5, 2015	1.8/5	9.95	1.2	4.01	3.0	13.96
4	"Robots"	October 12, 2015	1.7/5	9.40	1.1	3.88	2.8	13.29
5	"Super Fun Guys"	October 19, 2015	1.8/5	9.46	1.1	3.94	2.9	13.40
6	"Tech, Drugs, and Rock 'n' Roll"	October 26, 2015	1.9/6	9.69	1.0	3.85	2.9	13.54
7	"Crazy Train"	November 2, 2015	1.9/5	9.51	1.0	3.74	2.9	13.24
8	"Area 51"	November 9, 2015	1.8/5	9.34	1.0	3.85	2.8	13.19
9	"US vs UN vs UK"	November 16, 2015	1.7/5	9.16	0.9	3.81	2.6	12.97
10	"Arrivals and Departures"	November 23, 2015	1.7/5	8.95	0.8	3.41	2.5	12.36
11	"The Old College Try"	December 7, 2015	1.7/5	9.30	1.1	3.83	2.8	13.13
12	"Dam Breakthrough"	December 14, 2015	1.8/6	9.28	1.0	3.44	2.8	12.72
13	"White Out"	January 4, 2016	2.2/7	11.67	1.0	3.30	3.2	14.97
14	"Sun of a Gun"	January 18, 2016	2.0/6	11.60	1.1	3.69	3.1	15.29
15	"Da Bomb"	January 25, 2016	1.9/6	10.69	1.0	3.77	3.0	14.47
16	"Fractured"	February 8, 2016	2.1/6	11.36	0.9	3.25	3.0	14.62
17	"Adaptation"	February 22, 2016	1.7/5	9.87	0.9	3.41	2.6	13.28
18	"The Fast and the Nerdiest"	February 29, 2016	1.5/5	9.23	1.0	3.62	2.5	12.85
19	"Ticker"	March 14, 2016	1.6/5	8.96	0.8	3.22	2.4	12.18
20	"Djibouti Call"	March 21, 2016	1.5/5	8.65	0.9	3.37	2.4	12.02
21	"Twist and Shout"	March 28, 2016	1.6/5	8.74	0.9	3.40	2.5	12.13
22	"Hard Knox"	April 11, 2016	1.6/5	8.60	0.9	3.38	2.5	11.98
23	"Chernobyl Intentions"	April 18, 2016	1.5/5	8.35	0.9	3.38	2.5	11.97
24	"Toby or Not Toby"	April 25, 2016	1.6/5	8.98	—N/a	—N/a	—N/a	—N/a

=== Season 3 ===
Viewership and ratings per episode of List of Scorpion episodes
No.	Title	Air date	Rating/share (18–49)	Viewers (millions)	DVR (18–49)	DVR viewers (millions)	Total (18–49)	Total viewers (millions)
1	"Civil War"	October 3, 2016	1.5/5	8.30	0.8	3.43	2.4	11.79
2	"More Civil War"	October 3, 2016	1.5/5	8.30	0.8	3.43	2.4	11.79
3	"It Isn't the Fall That Kills You"	October 10, 2016	1.3/5	7.05	0.9	3.35	2.2	10.39
4	"Little Boy Lost"	October 17, 2016	1.3/5	7.17	0.9	3.62	2.2	10.80
5	"Plight at the Museum"	October 24, 2016	1.2/4	7.03	0.9	3.65	2.1	10.68
6	"Bat Poop Crazy"	October 31, 2016	1.1/4	6.51	0.9	3.58	2.0	10.09
7	"We're Gonna Need a Bigger Vote"	November 7, 2016	1.1/4	6.92	0.9	3.95	2.0	10.87
8	"Sly and the Family Stone"	November 14, 2016	1.2/4	7.22	0.8	3.59	2.0	10.81
9	"Mother Load"	November 21, 2016	1.2/4	7.07	0.9	3.38	2.1	10.45
10	"This is the Pits"	December 12, 2016	1.1/4	6.98	0.8	3.45	1.9	10.43
11	"Wreck the Halls"	December 19, 2016	1.2/4	7.53	—N/a	—N/a	—N/a	—N/a
12	"Ice Ca-Cabes"	January 2, 2017	1.2/4	7.37	0.8	3.38	2.0	10.75
13	"Faux Money Maux Problems"	January 16, 2017	1.2/4	7.81	0.9	3.59	2.1	11.40
14	"The Hole Truth"	January 23, 2017	1.3/5	7.77	0.9	3.49	2.2	11.26
15	"Sharknerdo"	February 6, 2017	1.2/5	7.76	0.9	3.55	2.1	11.31
16	"Keep It In Check, Mate"	February 13, 2017	1.2/4	7.24	0.9	3.48	2.1	10.72
17	"Dirty Seeds, Done Dirt Cheap"	February 20, 2017	1.2/4	7.19	0.8	3.25	2.0	10.44
18	"Don't Burst My Bubble"	February 27, 2017	1.2/4	6.88	—N/a	—N/a	—N/a	—N/a
19	"Monkey See, Monkey Poo"	March 13, 2017	1.1/4	6.61	0.8	3.48	1.9	10.09
20	"Broken Wind"	March 20, 2017	1.1/4	6.46	0.8	3.35	1.9	9.81
21	"Rock Block"	April 10, 2017	1.0/4	6.40	0.9	3.36	1.9	9.77
22	"Strife on Mars"	April 17, 2017	1.1/4	6.59	0.8	3.29	1.9	9.88
23	"Something Burrowed, Something Blew"	May 1, 2017	1.1/4	7.11	0.8	3.41	1.9	10.52
24	"Maroon 8"	May 8, 2017	1.1/4	7.52	0.9	3.21	2.0	10.73
25	"Scorp Family Robinson"	May 15, 2017	1.2/5	7.89	0.8	3.34	2.0	11.23

=== Season 4 ===
Viewership and ratings per episode of List of Scorpion episodes
No.	Title	Air date	Rating/share (18–49)	Viewers (millions)	DVR (18–49)	DVR viewers (millions)	Total (18–49)	Total viewers (millions)
1	"Extinction"	September 25, 2017	1.0/4	5.75	1.0	4.12	2.0	9.88
2	"More Extinction"	October 2, 2017	0.8/3	5.23	0.8	3.30	1.6	8.56
3	"Grow a Deer, A Female Deer"	October 9, 2017	0.8/3	4.82	0.7	3.15	1.5	7.98
4	"Nuke Kids on the Block"	October 16, 2017	0.8/3	4.84	0.7	2.99	1.5	7.83
5	"Sci Hard"	October 23, 2017	0.8/3	5.15	0.8	3.06	1.6	8.21
6	"Queen Scary"	October 30, 2017	0.7/3	4.93	0.7	3.02	1.4	7.93
7	"Go With the Flo(rence)"	November 6, 2017	0.8/3	5.18	0.6	2.97	1.4	8.15
8	"Faire is Foul"	November 13, 2017	0.8/3	4.74	0.7	2.95	1.5	7.70
9	"It's Raining Men (of War)"	November 20, 2017	0.9/3	5.13	0.7	2.98	1.6	8.11
10	"Crime Every Mountain"	November 27, 2017	0.9/3	5.50	0.7	2.99	1.6	8.49
11	"Who Let the Dog Out ('Cause Now It's Stuck In a Cistern)"	December 11, 2017	0.9/3	5.92	—N/a	—N/a	—N/a	—N/a
12	"A Christmas Car-Roll"	December 18, 2017	0.8/3	5.35	—N/a	—N/a	—N/a	—N/a
13	"The Bunker Games"	January 15, 2018	0.9/4	5.62	0.9	3.56	1.8	9.18
14	"Lighthouse of the Rising Sun"	January 22, 2018	0.8/3	5.23	0.8	3.32	1.6	8.55
15	"Wave Goodbye"	January 29, 2018	0.9/4	5.82	0.8	3.21	1.7	9.03
16	"Nerd, Wind and Fire"	February 5, 2018	0.8/3	5.55	0.7	3.21	1.5	8.76
17	"Dumbster Fire"	February 26, 2018	0.8/3	5.06	0.7	3.22	1.5	8.28
18	"Dork Day Afternoon"	March 5, 2018	0.8/3	5.51	—N/a	3.01	—N/a	8.53
19	"Gator Done"	March 19, 2018	0.8/3	4.82	0.7	3.07	1.4	7.84
20	"Foul Balls"	March 26, 2018	0.8/3	4.84	0.7	3.04	1.5	7.94
21	"Kenny and the Jet"	April 9, 2018	0.7/3	5.44	0.7	2.79	1.4	8.22
22	"A Lie in the Sand"	April 16, 2018	0.7/3	5.22	0.6	2.74	1.3	7.97
