= Stephen Nicholas (actor) =

British actor (born 1978)

Stephen Charles Nicholas (born 23 August 1978) music artist and presenter from Doncaster, South Yorkshire, England.

As an actor Stephens first role was on Sky One's Dream Team, where he played Scott Ward. From there, he filmed the first in the trilogy Goal! (In which he played a Newcastle United Reserves player). Following this, he moved to Los Angeles, where he played Smith in the feature film Futbaal: The Price of Dreams.

Stephen then returned to the UK to make a Bollywood film called Dhana Dhana Goal with John Abraham.

Stephen then experienced her first opportunity in reality TV with the show Premier League All Stars for Sky One, as well as playing a footballer, he was on-hand to present celebrity gossip and pitch side reports.

He then appeared in Celebrity Most Haunted and Date the Enemy. From there he then went on to star in Goal 3 where he not only acted in the film he also became the football choreographer and choreographed all the football scenes in the film.

Nicholas then starred in the film Damned United where he played Welsh international Alan Durban, the film was filmed in Chesterfield and Leeds and was directed by Oscar winner Tom Hooper and also starred Oscar nominated Michael Sheen.

Stephen's next production was the feature film called 'No Way Back Now'about the notorious Manchester district of Moss Side, where Stephen played the lead actor Stuart Gavin. The feature is roughly based on the notorious Gooch gang that terrorised Manchester throughout the years.

The next move for Stephen was pantomime where he was part of the production Aladdin over the Christmas period of 2015 in Doncaster playing Abanaza the main villain which he did until 7 January 2016.

He was also in the feature film 'Whiteblade' where he played Thurstan the head Warlord Whiteblade. Stephen shot his scenes in August 2016.

In September 2016 Stephen presented the Sky TV show 'Britz go Bollywood'. The show consists of a group of celebrities being dressed by the best Indian designers. Stephen was the main presenter of the show.

== Music ==
Nicholas instigated and was part of a group called U.K. Flow. The group was made up of 14 celebrities from television and sport.

== Football ==
Nicholas was a Sunday league footballer at various clubs

== Filmography ==
Title	Character	Date
Dhan Dhana Dhan Goal	Mark Hindes	2007
Dream Team	Scott Ward	2002–2007
Eastern Promises	Micheals	2007
Futbaal: The Price of Dreams	Smith	2006
Goal!	Dale Chippie	2005
Emmerdale	Donna Windsor's boyfriend	2002
