= Walter O'Brien =

Irish businessman, founder of Scorpion Computer Services

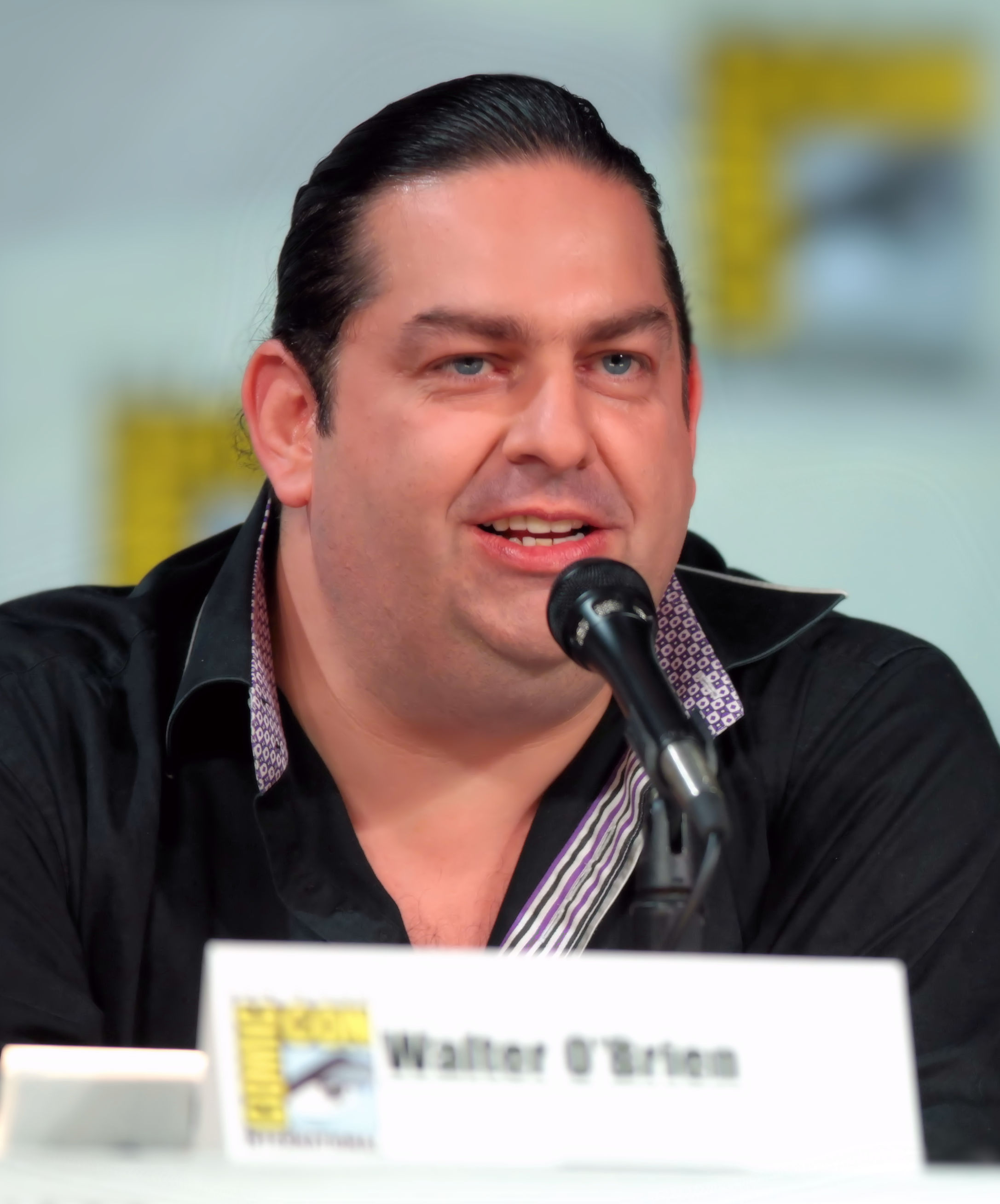
- O'Brien speaking at the 2014 San Diego Comic-Con on the Scorpion panel
- Born: 24 February 1975 (age 51); Clonroche, County Wexford, Ireland
- Education: University of Sussex
- Occupation: CEO of Scorpion Computer Services
- Known for: Inspiration of the television series Scorpion

Walter O'Brien (born 24 February 1975) is an Irish businessman and information technologist. He was also the executive producer and loose inspiration for the television series Scorpion. He is known for his claims of various accomplishments (such as a childhood IQ of 197) that have not withstood scrutiny.

== Early life ==
=== Childhood and education ===
Walter O'Brien was born in 1975 at Boro Hill House, situated in Ballymackessy, Clonroche, County Wexford, Ireland, to his parents Maurice and Anne O'Brien. The second of five children, he grew up on a farm. He attended St. Patrick's National School in Courtnacuddy until his family moved to Rosshaven, when he was 13 years old. There he attended St. Mary's Christian Brothers School, Enniscorthy.

O'Brien has stated he scored a 197 on an IQ test administered by one of his teachers in primary school but did not keep the paperwork.

Techdirt and The Irish Times said that O'Brien's 197 IQ score from childhood does not mean his intelligence exceeds that of other adults because scoring is scaled based on age. Mike Masnick noted that of all the "top IQ" lists available online, each one is different and none contains O'Brien's name. Susan Karlin questioned why, since O'Brien uses his childhood IQ score as part of his self-marketing, he did not retake the test through Mensa so that it could be confirmed.

After completing his Leaving Certificate at St Kieran's College in Kilkenny, O'Brien attended the University of Sussex where he graduated with a Bachelor of Science degree in computer science and artificial intelligence.

=== Early interest in computers ===
According to the New Ross Standard, his interest in computers began when his primary school started offering a computer course. O'Brien's father gave him livestock as payment for doing chores on the farm, which he sold in order to purchase an Amstrad personal computer at age nine, around 1984.

Other sources indicate that his interest began when he was 14 when his parents bought him a computer.

O'Brien has stated that when he was thirteen years old (c. 1988), he hacked into NASA under the pseudonym "Scorpion".

In an interview with Silicon Republic, an Irish technology news website, O'Brien claimed that the NSA, through Interpol, appeared at his home following the hack. He told the agents he would help show them vulnerabilities in their network in exchange for not getting into trouble. According to O'Brien, he had an extradition document ready in his backpack, but he could not provide more details on the deal that was made due to non-disclosure agreements.

French tabloid Telestar reported that there is no record of the alleged NASA hack. Techdirt pointed out that the United States Department of Homeland Security—which CBS showed surrounding O'Brien's family's home in the television show—did not exist at the time of the alleged hack.

O'Brien was a member of the Irish team that participated in the 1993 International Olympiad in Informatics computer coding competition. The university from which he graduated shows his team finished the 1993 Olympiad in 90th place out of 250.

== Career ==
O'Brien allegedly founded Scorpion Computer Services at age 13 in 1988. The Irish Times reported he brought the business with him in the late 1990s, after graduating from university and moving to the United States. The New Ross Standard wrote that Scorpion Computer Services started as an IT tutoring service that expanded into security and risk management, and The Irish Times also described Scorpion Computer Services as an artificial intelligence company. In 2014, O'Brien described his company as a think tank for "high IQ individuals".

O'Brien started Scorpion Studios, which advises film and television producers on how to make technology appear real.

=== Boston Marathon bombing ===
A month after the bombing at the 2013 Boston Marathon, Fox 11 LA-KTTV (Los Angeles) reported that O'Brien's company, Scorpion Computer Services, Inc., developed video-analysis software similar to that used by the FBI to catch the bombers. Techdirt said that this was one of many "bogus" claims about O'Brien by CBS. Asher Langton, a security intelligence engineer, said O'Brien offered conflicting narratives of his contributions to catching the bombers and that the use of facial recognition software in the manner reported was implausible. O'Brien said he was bound by non-disclosure agreements.

=== CBS show ===
According to O'Brien, in an effort to promote his company Scorpion Computer Services, Inc. and its service Concierge Up, he came up with the idea to create a television show. O'Brien contacted Scooter Braun who pitched the idea to CBS. In September 2014, CBS premiered the first season of the drama series, Scorpion, based on O'Brien's alleged life experiences. He served as an executive producer for the series, and regularly contributed to story development. For his part in story development, O'Brien consulted with series writers on technical aspects of the plot, including how he would solve problems presented in the show's scripts. The technical aspects of the plot, however, were a reason for a review published on the website of the National Science Teachers Association to advise teachers to use the show as an example of incorrect or exaggerated science in 2015. O'Brien also consulted with Elyes Gabel, the actor who plays the fictional Walter O'Brien. In an interview with CBS News to promote the second season, Gabel said about O'Brien that "he's out saving the world or talking to, you know, princes of Liechtenstein. So every now and again, I get the chance to talk to him and he'll call me up. And sometimes we talk about the show. Sometimes we talk about characters."

The first season attracted more than 26 million viewers. CBS ordered a full season of Scorpion in October 2014 and renewed it for a second season in 2015. The show was renewed again for a third season in 2016, with a fourth season confirmed for 2017. In March 2017, CBS renewed Scorpion for season 4. The show was cancelled after four seasons in May 2018.

== Accuracy of biography ==
In 2014, CNET, Techdirt, and Fast Company evaluated CBS' claims about O'Brien's accomplishments, widely reported in the media, following questions to Fast Company. The Irish Times said that "it is impossible to substantiate some claims." In a follow-up interview with Susan Karlin of Fast Company, O'Brien answered some of Karlin's questions but said that he was bound by non-disclosure agreements.

Karlin wrote that some community-edited business directories showed O'Brien's company was much smaller than the 2,600 employees and $1.3 billion in revenues stated in Karlin's original article. For example, in 2014 an anonymous editor on Credibility.com recorded Scorpion Computer Services as having 1 employee with an annual revenue of $66,000. Karlin points out that community-edited business directories data may be unreliable, and O'Brien stated that most of the company consists of independent contractors who work remotely.

In a News.com.au interview of Elyes Gabel, the actor who plays the fictional O'Brien in the TV show, the reporter Andrew Fenton says: "But even Elyes Gabel, who plays O'Brien in the show, admits he has some concerns over the veracity of the story. He says that to find the character he had to push those doubts to one side and just accept O'Brien's story as gospel." "That meant everything that he was saying I believe rather than kind of questioning," he says. "That becomes a very dangerous, treacherous area if you don't really fully commit or believe in what somebody is saying. So once I got rid of that, the balance became: 'How do I make this guy? How do I create vulnerability in a character?"

Fenton goes on to say:

In reality many of O'Brien's claims don't stack up. He says he didn't keep the paperwork showing he scored 197 on an IQ test in primary school — but even if it were true, scores are scaled with age, meaning a high score as a child doesn't reflect his intelligence as an adult. He hasn't taken an official Mensa-approved test since. There's also no evidence of the NASA hack and O'Brien can't provide further details claiming he signed a non-disclosure agreement. And of course Homeland Security was formed as a result of the attack on the Twin Towers and didn't exist when he was 13.

== Personal life ==
O'Brien has lived in Los Angeles, California, since 2001 when he was issued an EB-1 visa to immigrate to the United States. This type of visa is set aside for people with "extraordinary abilities" and/or who can be considered a national asset and goes to thousands of people each year.

In 2015, Kilkenny People reported that O'Brien received a mayoral certificate from the mayor of Kilkenny for his contribution and dedication to the Irish community in Los Angeles. O'Brien helped fund the start-up cost of Kilkenny Taxi Watch which Kilkenny People reported as having prevented 45 suicides through July 2015. By April 2016, Taxi Watch stated on their Facebook page that the number of lives saved had reached 100.

O'Brien has spoken at numerous events, including speaking at the Mensa 2016 annual gathering event in San Diego, and the Houston Innovation Conference and Showcase.

In 2017, O'Brien was honored with unite4:humanity's Humanitarian Lifetime Achievement award.
