= Now You See Me (franchise) =

American heist thriller film series

- Official film series logo
- Created by: Boaz Yakin; Edward Ricourt
- Original work: Now You See Me (2013)
- Owner: Lionsgate Films
- Years: 2013-present

Films and television
- Films: Now You See Me (2013); Now You See Me 2 (2016); Now You See Me: Now You Don't (2025); Now You See Me 4 (TBA)

Audio
- Soundtracks: Now You See Me; Now You See Me 2; Now You See Me: Now You Don't

Now You See Me is a media franchise centering on a series of heist thriller films created by Boaz Yakin and Edward Ricourt. The overall plot centers on a team of illusionists named The Four Horsemen, who use their stage productions as a means of completing unfeasible and lucrative heists. The films feature an ensemble cast including Jesse Eisenberg, Mark Ruffalo, Woody Harrelson, Isla Fisher, Dave Franco, Michael Caine, Lizzy Caplan, and Morgan Freeman.

Though the series as a whole has received mixed critical reception, they have been met with a more welcome response from audiences, and have been a financial success at the box office. The first three films combined have grossed over $933.2 million worldwide. A fourth film is currently in development.

== Films ==
=== Now You See Me (2013) ===
On October 25, 2011, Summit Entertainment announced the release date for Now You See Me for July 18, 2013. On November 3, 2011, the company revealed the film's first synopsis and teaser poster. On January 16, 2012, shooting began in New Orleans, Louisiana, which lasted until March 26, 2012. Additional filming took place in New York City on February 13 and in Las Vegas from April 9, 2012, to the following day. Isla Fisher "nearly drowned" while filming the water tank scene. "My chain got stuck. I had to really swim to the bottom; I couldn't get up. Everyone thought I was acting fabulously. I was actually drowning," she said during an interview on Chelsea Lately. "No one realized I was actually struggling." A stuntman standing nearby used a quick-release switch to save her.

=== Now You See Me 2 (2016) ===
On July 3, 2013, after the box office success of the first film, Lions Gate Entertainment CEO Jon Feltheimer confirmed that there would be a sequel to the film, with production beginning in 2014 for an unspecified release date. In September 2014, it was confirmed that Jon M. Chu would replace Louis Leterrier (who eventually serves as executive producer) as the sequel's director. On October 2, 2014, Michael Caine confirmed in an interview that Daniel Radcliffe would be playing his son in the film and that shooting is expected to begin in December in London. The film was produced by Summit Entertainment and K/O Paper Products. In October 2014, it was announced that Isla Fisher would be unable to reprise her role as Henley Reeves due to her pregnancy and Lizzy Caplan was cast as new character Lula to replace her as the Fourth Horseman. The sequel was thought to be titled Now You See Me: Now You Don't, with the director pushing for that name, but the studio call announced in November 2014 was that the film had changed its title to Now You See Me: The Second Act. On January 28, 2015, Henry Lloyd-Hughes was confirmed to play the role of a tech whiz kid named Allen Scott-Frank. On December 22, 2014, it was reported that Morgan Freeman was not going to reprise his role as Thaddeus Bradley, but on January 19, 2015, film director Chu posted a selfie with Freeman on his Instagram, verifying that he would return.

=== Now You See Me: Now You Don't (2025) ===
In May 2015, Lionsgate CEO Jon Feltheimer announced that developments for a third film were underway. In December 2016, it was announced that Jon M. Chu would return as director, with a script co-written by Neile Widener and Gavin James. Bobby Cohen, Alex Kurtzman, and Jeb Brody will serve as producers. It was later confirmed that among returning cast members, Benedict Cumberbatch would be featured in a supporting role.

By April 2020, Eric Warren Singer had been hired to do a rewrite of the most recent draft of the script. In September 2022, Ruben Fleischer joined the production as director, replacing Chu; while Seth Grahame-Smith was hired by the filmmaker and wrote a new draft of the script. The project will be a joint-venture production between Secret Hideout Productions and Lionsgate Films, with Lions Gate Entertainment distributing. In November 2023, it was confirmed that the film would be titled Now You See Me 3, with principal photography scheduled to commence in spring of the following year. It was at that time announced that franchise writers Ed Solomon and Boaz Yakin had contributed to the most recent draft of the script, which Lionsgate describes as a "reimagining". Later that month, Eisenberg confirmed that he will reprise his role while acknowledging that production will begin early the following year.

In April 2024, Lionsgate confirmed at the year's CinemaCon that pre-production for the film has commenced, with most of the original cast members expected to reprise their roles, including Isla Fisher as Henley, and with Ariana Greenblatt, Dominic Sessa, and Justice Smith added to the cast. In May 2024, it was confirmed that Rosamund Pike has joined the third installment. In July 2024, Lionsgate announced that Now You See Me 3 will release on November 14, 2025.

At CinemaCon on April 1, 2025, the official title of the film was announced as Now You See Me: Now You Don't.

=== Future ===
==== Now You See Me 4 ====
In April 2025, during Lionsgate's presentation at CinemaCon, a fourth installment in the Now You See Me franchise was officially confirmed to be in development with Ruben Fleischer returning to direct.

==== Potential spin-off ====
In July 2016, it was announced that a spin-off film, starring Jay Chou was in development. The actor will reprise his role from Now You See Me 2, and with the film stated to feature a cast that is primarily Chinese. The project will be a joint-venture production between the U.S. and China, with Lionsgate Films and Leomus Pictures producing the film.

Film	U.S. release date	Director	Screenwriter(s)	Story by	Producers
Now You See Me	May 31, 2013	Louis Leterrier	Ed Solomon, Boaz Yakin & Edward Ricourt	Boaz Yakin & Edward Ricourt	Bobby Cohen, Roberto Orci & Alex Kurtzman
Now You See Me 2	June 10, 2016	Jon M. Chu	Ed Solomon	Ed Solomon & Peter Chiarelli	Bobby Cohen, Roberto Orci & Alex Kurtzman
Now You See Me: Now You Don't	November 14, 2025	Ruben Fleischer	Rhett Reese, Paul Wernick, Michael Lesslie & Seth Grahame-Smith	Eric Warren Singer	Bobby Cohen & Alex Kurtzman
Now You See Me 4	TBA	Ruben Fleischer	TBA	TBA	TBA

== Cast ==
List indicators

This section includes characters who will appear or have appeared in the series.

- An empty grey cell indicates the character was not in the film, or that the character's official presence has not yet been confirmed.
- ^{C} indicates a cameo role.
- ^{U} indicates an uncredited appearance.
- ^{Y} indicates a younger version of the character.

Character	Film		
Character	Now You See Me	Now You See Me 2	Now You See Me: Now You Don't
Character	2013	2016	2025
The Four Horsemen / The Five Horsemen / The Horsemen
J. Daniel "Danny" Atlas	Jesse Eisenberg	Jesse Eisenberg	Jesse Eisenberg
Merritt McKinney	Woody Harrelson	Woody Harrelson	Woody Harrelson
Jack Wilder	Dave Franco	Dave Franco	Dave Franco
Henley Reeves	Isla Fisher	Mentioned	Isla Fisher
Lula May		Lizzy Caplan	Lizzy Caplan
Dylan Rhodes (Shrike)	Mark Ruffalo	Mark Ruffalo William Henderson^{Y}	Mark Ruffalo^{C}
Charlie Vanderberg			Justice Smith
Bosco LeRoy			Dominic Sessa
June Rouclere			Ariana Greenblatt
Supporting cast
Thaddeus Bradley	Morgan Freeman	Morgan Freeman	Morgan Freeman
Arthur Tressler	Michael Caine	Michael Caine	
Agent Cowan	David Warshofsky	David Warshofsky	
Lionel Shrike	Elias Koteas^{U}	Richard Laing	
Chase McKinney	Mentioned	Woody Harrelson	
Alma Dray	Mélanie Laurent		
Agent Evans	Common		
Agent Fuller	Michael Kelly		
Jasmine Tressler	Caitriona Balfe		
Walter Mabry		Daniel Radcliffe	
Li		Jay Chou	
Bu Bu		Tsai Chin	
Agent Natalie Austin		Sanaa Lathan	
Allen Scott-Frank		Henry Lloyd-Hughes	
Veronika Vanderberg			Rosamund Pike
Brett Finnegan			Andrew Santino

== Additional crew and production details ==
Film	Crew/Detail					
Film	Composer	Cinematographer(s)	Editor(s)	Production companies	Distributing company	Running time
Now You See Me	Brian Tyler	Larry Fong; Mitchell Amundsen	Robert Leighton; Vincent Tabaillon	K/O Paper Products; Summit Entertainment; SOIXAN7E QUIN5E Films; See Me Louisiana Studios	Lionsgate	124 mins
Now You See Me 2	Brian Tyler	Peter Deming	Stan Salfas	TIK Films; Leomus Pictures; Longcross Studios; K/O Paper Products; Summit Entertainment	Lionsgate	129 mins
Now You See Me: Now You Don't	Brian Tyler	George Richmond	Stacey Schroeder	Summit Entertainment; Secret Hideout Productions; Media Capital Technologies	Lionsgate	112 mins

== Reception ==
=== Box office performance ===
Film	Box office gross				Box office ranking		Budget	Ref.
Film	Opening weekend (North America)	North America	Other territories	Worldwide	All time North America-	All time worldwide	Budget	Ref.
Now You See Me	$29,350,389	$117,723,989	$234,000,000	$351,723,989	#516	#317	$75 million	
Now You See Me 2	$22,383,146	$65,075,540	$269,825,797	$334,901,337	#1174	#347	$90 million	
Now You See Me: Now You Don't	$21,300,000	$61,882,396	$184,720,603	$246,602,999			$90 million	
Total		$244,681,925	$688,546,400	$933,228,325			$255 million	

=== Critical and public response ===
Film	Rotten Tomatoes	Metacritic	CinemaScore
Now You See Me	51% (174 reviews)	50 (35 reviews)	A-
Now You See Me 2	34% (197 reviews)	46 (33 reviews)	A-
Now You See Me: Now You Don't	60% (146 reviews)	50 (34 reviews)	B+

== Live show ==
A live illusion show inspired by the franchise premiered in Beijing in November 2018 before touring China. It opened in Sydney in December 2025, Singapore in early 2026, and in London at the London Coliseum in July 2026. The show is scheduled to play at Broadway's Al Hirschfeld Theatre for a run lasting from November 2026 to January 2027.
