= Robert Leighton (film editor) =

British film editor

- Born: United Kingdom
- Education: London Film School
- Occupation: film editor

Robert Leighton is a British film and television editor with more than 30 feature film credits since 1980. He has edited nearly all of the films by film director Rob Reiner, commencing with This Is Spinal Tap in 1984. He has also edited three films with Christopher Guest. His work includes hit comedies and mockumentaries such as This Is Spinal Tap, Best in Show and When Harry Met Sally... as well as classic dramas such as Stand by Me and the Stephen King thriller, Misery, which garnered actress Kathy Bates a "Best Actress" Oscar. He was nominated for the Academy Award for Best Film Editing for the feature film, A Few Good Men (1992).

Leighton is an alumnus of London Film School.

== Filmography ==
Leighton's filmography is based on the listing at the Internet Movie Database.

Editor
Year	Film	Director	Notes	Ref.
1976	Gone with the Pope	Duke Mitchell		
1978	Stunt Rock	Brian Trenchard-Smith	Credited as Robert H. Money	
1981	Delusion	Alan Beattie		
1981	Kill and Kill Again	Ivan Hall		
1983	Wavelength	Mike Gray		
1985	The Sure Thing	Rob Reiner	Second collaboration with Rob Reiner	
1986	Stand by Me	Rob Reiner	Third collaboration with Rob Reiner	
1987	The Princess Bride	Rob Reiner	Fourth collaboration with Rob Reiner	
1988	Bull Durham	Ron Shelton	First collaboration with Ron Shelton	
1989	When Harry Met Sally...	Rob Reiner	Fifth collaboration with Rob Reiner	
1989	Blaze	Ron Shelton	Second collaboration with Ron Shelton	
1990	Misery	Rob Reiner	Sixth collaboration with Rob Reiner	
1991	Late for Dinner	W. D. Richter		
1992	A Few Good Men	Rob Reiner	Seventh collaboration with Rob Reiner	
1993	Life with Mikey	James Lapine		
1994	North	Rob Reiner	Eighth collaboration with Rob Reiner	
1995	The American President	Rob Reiner	Ninth collaboration with Rob Reiner	
1996	Ghosts of Mississippi	Rob Reiner	Tenth collaboration with Rob Reiner	
1998	Hush	Jonathan Darby		
1999	The Story of Us	Rob Reiner	Eleventh collaboration with Rob Reiner	
2000	Best in Show	Christopher Guest	First collaboration with Christopher Guest	
2003	A Mighty Wind	Christopher Guest	Second collaboration with Christopher Guest	
2003	Alex & Emma	Rob Reiner	Twelfth collaboration with Rob Reiner	
2004	Shall We Dance?	Peter Chelsom		
2005	Rumor Has It	Rob Reiner	Thirteenth collaboration with Rob Reiner	
2006	For Your Consideration	Christopher Guest	Third collaboration with Christopher Guest	
2007	The Bucket List	Rob Reiner	Fourteenth collaboration with Rob Reiner	
2010	Flipped	Rob Reiner	Fifteenth collaboration with Rob Reiner	
2012	People Like Us	Alex Kurtzman		
2013	Now You See Me	Louis Leterrier		
2014	Chef	Jon Favreau		
2015	The Intern	Nancy Meyers		
2017	A Dog's Purpose	Lasse Hallström		

Editorial department
Year	Film	Director	Role	Notes
1969	Mastermind	Alex March	Additional editor	
1977	Fantastic Animation Festival	Dean A. Berko; Christopher Padilla	Editor: Trailer	
1982	Blood Tide	Richard Jefferies	Supervising editor	
1984	This Is Spinal Tap	Rob Reiner	Supervising editor	First collaboration with Rob Reiner
1996	Courage Under Fire	Edward Zwick	Additional editor	
2011	The Details	Jacob Aaron Estes	Consulting editor	

Thanks
Year	Film	Director	Role
1992	We're Talking Serious Money	James Lemmo	Special thanks

Documentaries

Sound department
Year	Film	Director	Role
1979	80 Blocks from Tiffany's	Gary Weis	Sound effects editor

Shorts

Editor
Year	Film	Director
1979	Best Horse	Stephen Gyllenhaal

TV movies

Sound department
Year	Film	Director	Role
1978	Things We Did Last Summer	Gary Weis	Sound editor

TV series

Editor
Year	Title	Notes
2013	Family Tree	4 episodes

Sound department
Year	Title	Role	Notes
1979	Lou Grant	Sound editor Sound effects editor	2 episodes

== Awards and nominations ==
This list is based on the Internet Movie Database.

- 2001 - Best in Show - (Nominated) - ACE Eddie Award - Best Editing - Feature Film - Comedy or Musical
- 1993 - A Few Good Men - (Nominated) - Academy of Motion Picture Arts and Sciences ("Oscar") - Best Film Editing
- 1993 - A Few Good Men - (Nominated) - ACE Eddie Award - Best Film Editing

== See also ==
- List of film director and editor collaborations
