= Now You See Me (film) =

2013 film by Louis Leterrier

- Theatrical release poster
- Directed by: Louis Leterrier
- Screenplay by: Ed Solomon; Boaz Yakin; Edward Ricourt
- Story by: Boaz Yakin; Edward Ricourt
- Produced by: Alex Kurtzman; Roberto Orci; Bobby Cohen
- Starring: Jesse Eisenberg; Mark Ruffalo; Woody Harrelson; Mélanie Laurent; Isla Fisher; Common; Dave Franco; Michael Caine; Morgan Freeman
- Cinematography: Larry Fong; Mitchell Amundsen
- Edited by: Robert Leighton; Vincent Tabaillon
- Music by: Brian Tyler
- Production companies: Summit Entertainment; K/O Paper Products
- Distributed by: Lionsgate
- Release dates: May 21, 2013 (New York City); May 31, 2013 (United States)
- Running time: 115 minutes
- Country: United States
- Language: English
- Budget: $75 million
- Box office: $351.7 million

Now You See Me is a 2013 American heist film directed by Louis Leterrier from a screenplay by Ed Solomon, Boaz Yakin, and Edward Ricourt and a story by Yakin and Ricourt. It is the first installment in the Now You See Me series.

The film features an ensemble cast of Jesse Eisenberg, Mark Ruffalo, Woody Harrelson, Mélanie Laurent, Isla Fisher, Common, Dave Franco, Michael Caine and Morgan Freeman. The plot follows an FBI agent and an Interpol detective who track and attempt to bring to justice a team of magicians who pull off bank heists and robberies during their performances and reward their audiences with the money.

The film premiered in New York City on May 21, 2013, before its official release in the United States on May 31, 2013, by Summit Entertainment. The film received mixed reviews with criticism being focused on the ending, but became a box office success, grossing $351.7 million worldwide against a budget of $75 million. The film won the People's Choice Award for Favorite Thriller Movie and also received nominations for the Empire Award for Best Thriller and the Saturn Award for Best Thriller Film and Best Music.

A sequel, Now You See Me 2, was released on June 10, 2016. A third installment, Now You See Me: Now You Don't, was released on November 14, 2025.

== Plot ==
Four highly talented magicians—J. Daniel Atlas, Merritt McKinney, Henley Reeves, and Jack Wilder—each receive a card leading them to an apartment in New York City. There, they discover holographic instructions from an unknown benefactor.

A year later, in Las Vegas, they perform as "The Four Horsemen" in a show funded by insurance magnate Arthur Tressler. Their final trick involves transporting an audience member inside a Crédit Républicain bank vault in Paris. Stacks of euro are drawn into the vault's air vents and showered on the crowd; the trick appears to have happened as the Paris vault is found empty of its recent shipment. The FBI and Interpol arrest the Horsemen but release them for lack of evidence. FBI agent Dylan Rhodes and French Interpol detective Alma Dray consult with Thaddeus Bradley, a former magician-turned-debunker, who deduces that the Horsemen used a mock vault under the stage, stole the real money in advance, and replaced it with flash paper resembling the cash. The flash paper burned when the vents were activated, leaving no smoke or residue. They also hypnotized the participant, chosen before the heist, to help with the final trick and forged his signature using his credit card.

With Thaddeus's help, the FBI tracks the Horsemen to a show in New Orleans, where they transfer millions from Tressler's accounts to audience members who were denied insurance claims following Hurricane Katrina. Dylan tries to capture them but fails. Furious, Tressler hires Thaddeus to expose the Horsemen for robbing him. Meanwhile, Alma suspects they are performing the heists as an initiation to a secret group, "the Eye", consisting of magicians who steal from the powerful to aid the vulnerable and instill hope. The FBI discovers that the Horsemen replaced Dylan's phone with a bugged clone to stay ahead in the investigation. They track Dylan's real phone to a New York apartment, where three Horsemen escape while Jack stays behind to destroy evidence. Jack crashes his car during a chase, seemingly dying.

Dylan finds papers about the Horsemen's next crime: stealing millions from an Elkhorn Security safe. After a call from Thaddeus, Dylan suspects Alma of helping the Horsemen, but she denies it. The FBI heads to Elkhorn's warehouse but finds the safe missing. It had been loaded on a truck under the orders of a hypnotized FBI agent, and they manage to intercept it. Opening the safe reveals it to be a decoy full of balloon animals. The FBI converges on the Horsemen's final show at 5 Pointz, where they give a farewell message to the crowd. As they leap off the roof, Alma stops Dylan from shooting them before the Horsemen disappear in a shower of counterfeit money. The real money from the Elkhorn safe is in Thaddeus's car, leading to his arrest as an accomplice of the Horsemen. Dylan visits him in jail, where Thaddeus realizes he is the true mastermind behind the Horsemen's schemes, having deceived the FBI into chasing a fake safe. Jack, who faked his death with a decoy car and a cadaver, broke into the real safe. The Horsemen misled the FBI into believing the safe was missing, hiding it behind a giant mirror, and framed Thaddeus for the stolen cash. At the Central Park Carousel, Dylan welcomes the Horsemen to the Eye.

At the Pont des Arts in Paris, Dylan meets Alma, who deduces his involvement with the Horsemen. Dylan explains that he is the son of Lionel Shrike, a magician outed by Thaddeus thirty years ago. Shrike tried to revive his career with an escape trick, but died while attempting it with a faulty safe. Dylan orchestrated the Horsemen's tricks as revenge for his father's death: Elkhorn's faulty safe caused the accident; Thaddeus ruined Shrike's career; and Crédit Républicain and Tressler's company denied his life insurance. Alma, who is sympathetic to Dylan, agrees to keep his secret.

== Cast ==
- Jesse Eisenberg as J. Daniel Atlas: An arrogant illusionist and street magician, and the ostensible leader of the Four Horsemen.
- Woody Harrelson as Merritt McKinney: A hypnotist, mentalist, and a self-proclaimed psychic. Originally more famous in his youth, his manager brother absconded with all his money, leaving McKinney with a long hard trek back to his former glory. Middle-aged, McKinney is the oldest of the Four Horsemen.
- Isla Fisher as Henley Reeves: An escapist and stage magician who is the only female member of the Four Horsemen. She is also Danny's former assistant and ex-lover.
- Dave Franco as Jack Wilder: A sleight of hand illusionist, street magician, and a talented impressionist of other people's voices. Additionally, he is a pickpocket, and is able to pick locks. In his early twenties, Jack is the youngest of the Four Horsemen.
- Mark Ruffalo as Dylan Rhodes: an FBI agent struggling to capture and bring the Four Horsemen to justice for their unique heist agenda.
- Mélanie Laurent as Alma Dray, a French Interpol agent who is partnered up with Dylan to investigate the Four Horsemen.
- Morgan Freeman as Thaddeus Bradley, a former magician who, for thirty years, has profited by revealing the secrets behind other magicians' tricks.
- Jessica C. Lindsey as Hermia, Thaddeus Bradley's assistant.
- Michael Caine as Arthur Tressler, an insurance magnate and the Four Horsemen's sponsor.
- David Warshofsky as Cowan, an FBI agent.
- Michael Kelly as Agent Fuller, an FBI agent and Dylan's partner.
- Common as Agent Evans, Dylan's supervisor at the FBI.
- José Garcia as Étienne Forcier, the account holder at the Crédit Républicain de Paris.
- Caitriona Balfe as Jasmine Tressler, Arthur Tressler's young wife.
- Conan O'Brien as himself

Additionally, Elias Koteas appears in an uncredited cameo as Lionel Shrike, a magician who drowned while performing an escape trick thirty years earlier.

== Production ==
On October 25, 2011, Summit Entertainment announced the release date for Now You See Me for July 18, 2013. On November 3, 2011, the company revealed the film's first synopsis and teaser poster.

On January 16, 2012, shooting began in New Orleans, Louisiana, which lasted until March 26, 2012. Additional filming took place in New York City in Manhattan on February 13, in Long Island City in Queens in early spring 2012 and in Las Vegas between April 9 and April 10, 2012.

Isla Fisher "nearly drowned" while filming the water tank scene. "My chain got stuck. I had to really swim to the bottom; I couldn't get up. Everyone thought I was acting fabulously. I was actually drowning," she said during an interview on Chelsea Lately. "No one realized I was actually struggling." A stuntman standing nearby used a quick-release switch to save her.

== Music ==
The official soundtrack, titled Now You See Me (Original Motion Picture Soundtrack), for the film was composed by Brian Tyler and was released by Glassnote Records on May 28, 2013, for physical purchase and digital download.

Additionally, the trailer featured an arrangement from Celldweller, namely of ShutEmDown.

== Release ==
The film premiered in New York City on May 21, 2013, before its official release in the United States on May 31, 2013, by Summit Entertainment.

Now You See Me was released on DVD and Blu-ray on September 3, 2013, through Lionsgate Home Entertainment. The Blu-ray release contains an extended version of the film featuring ten additional minutes. It also contains two featurettes: a behind-the-scenes and a "History of Magic", plus 30 minutes of deleted scenes. It was later released on Ultra HD Blu-ray on May 31, 2016 to coincide with the second film.

== Reception ==
=== Box office ===
By the end of its box office run, Now You See Me had grossed $117.7 million in the U.S. and Canada and $234 million in other territories for a worldwide total of $351.7 million, against a budget of $75 million.

The film had a successful box office run, placing second behind Fast & Furious 6 and taking $29,350,389 on its opening weekend from 2,925 theaters. By the end of June, it had grossed double its production budget. The film stayed in the top 10 of the North American box office for six weeks after release.

The biggest markets in other territories were France, China, Russia, South Korea, United Kingdom and Australia where the film grossed $25.7 million, $22.9 million, $21.2 million, $17.1 million, $16.8 million and $16.1 million, respectively.

=== Critical response ===
On Rotten Tomatoes, the film has an approval percentage of 51% based on 174 reviews and an average rating of 5.8/10. The critics consensus reads: "Now You See Me's thinly sketched characters and scattered plot rely on sleight of hand from the director to distract audiences." On Metacritic, the film has a score of 50 out of 100 based on 35 critic reviews, meaning "Mixed or Average". Audiences polled by CinemaScore gave the film an average grade of "A−" on an A+ to F scale.

Peter Hammond from Movieline wrote, "Pure summer movie magic—literally. More fun than Ocean's 11, 12, and 13 combined. You won't believe your eyes—and that's the point."

The film was criticized for its twist ending, with several critics citing it as too farfetched and illogical. Critic Lee Cassanell claimed the creators "ran out of top hats and rabbits and decided to saw their audiences' brains in half." Eric D. Snider was more positive towards the rest of the film, but felt that "the story moves jauntily toward its destination; the destination, unfortunately, is a disappointing wreck." Kent Garrison was far more critical, claiming the film to rely on "one of the worst, if not the worst twist in cinema history, and literally erases everything that it builds up to."

=== Accolades ===
List of awards and nominations
Award	Date of ceremony	Category	Recipient	Result	Ref.
People's Choice Awards	January 8, 2014	Favorite Thriller Movie	Now You See Me	Won	
Empire Awards	30 March 2014	Best Thriller	Now You See Me	Nominated	
Saturn Awards	June 26, 2014	Best Thriller Film	Now You See Me	Nominated	
Saturn Awards	June 26, 2014	Best Music	Brian Tyler	Nominated	

== Franchise ==
On July 3, 2013, after the box office success of the film, Lionsgate's CEO Jon Feltheimer confirmed that there would be a sequel to the film with production beginning in 2014 for an unspecified release date. Louis Leterrier stated that he would return to direct the sequel; however, in September 2014, it was confirmed that Jon M. Chu would replace Leterrier as director. Eisenberg, Ruffalo, Harrelson, Franco, Caine and Freeman were set to reprise their roles for the sequel. Fisher was unable to participate because of her third pregnancy and was replaced by Lizzy Caplan. On October 2, 2014, Michael Caine said in an interview that Daniel Radcliffe would be playing his son in the film. Filming began in late November. The film was released on June 10, 2016, titled Now You See Me 2.

On May 22, 2015, Lionsgate revealed details about the development of the second sequel, when CEO Jon Feltheimer announced that they had "already begun early planning for Now You See Me 3". Later in production, it was formally named Now You See Me: Now You Don't. It was released on November 14, 2025.
