= K/O Paper Products =

American film production company, 2004–2016

- Formerly: Kurtzman/Orci Productions (2004–2010)
- Type: Private
- Industry: Entertainment
- Founded: 2004; 22 years ago
- Founders: Alex Kurtzman; Roberto Orci
- Defunct: September 16, 2016; 9 years ago
- Fate: Dissolved
- Successors: Secret Hideout; Paper Products; Sneaky Shark Productions
- Headquarters: Beverly Hills, California, United States
- Area served: Worldwide
- Key people: Andrew Orci (Chairman and CEO); J.R. Orci (CCO); Bobby Cohen (President, Film and TV Division); Heather Kadin (President, TV Division); Jay Williams (President, Global Marketing and Brand Division); Aaron Baiers (Vice President, TV Division)
- Products: Television series; Motion pictures
- Owners: Alex Kurtzman and Roberto Orci

K/O Paper Products (also known as Kurtzman/Orci Paper Products) was an American television and motion picture production company founded by Alex Kurtzman and Roberto Orci c. 2004, after signing a deal with DreamWorks Pictures to rewrite the script of the 2005 film The Island.

== History ==
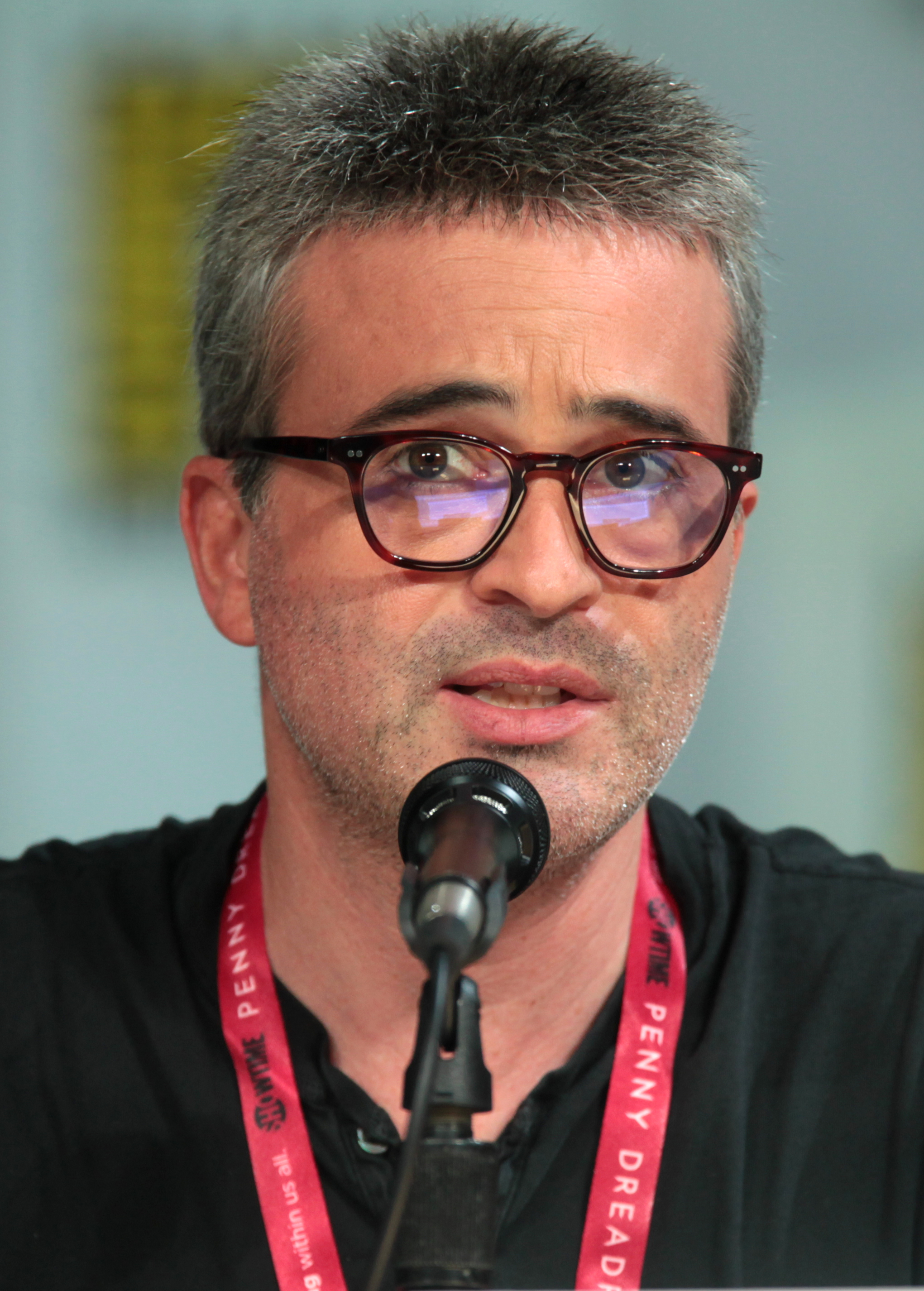
Orci's longtime writing partner Alex Kurtzman

Orci and Kurtzman began their writing collaboration on the television series Hercules: The Legendary Journeys, after being hired by Sam Raimi. They were also involved in the sister-series to Hercules, Xena: Warrior Princess. They sought to move to writing for a network-based television series, but found this difficult. After receiving a series of negative responses, they met with J. J. Abrams who was starting work on Alias at the time. The meeting went well, and resulted in them working on the series. They would go on to work together again on the Fox science fiction series Fringe, where all three were listed as co-creators. While working on Alias, Kurtzman and Orci went on to work independently, signed a first-look deal with Touchstone Television to develop properties for television.

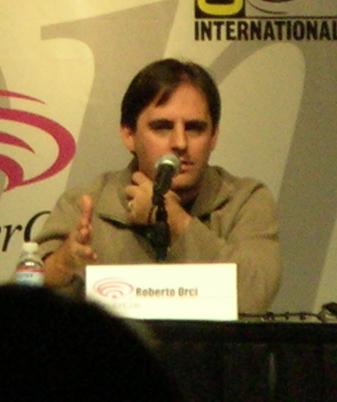
Orci in 2009

In 2003, the duo began writing their first feature project, the sequel to The Mask of Zorro, The Legend of Zorro for Columbia Pictures. Orci and Kurtzman received their break in writing for films in 2004, with the Michael Bay film The Island, for which they developed the spec script by Caspian Tredwell-Owen. When Kurtzman and Orci first met Bay, he asked the pair "Why should I trust you?", to which Orci replied: "You shouldn't yet. Let's see what happens." While this was not an overwhelming success, they were brought back for Bay's following film, Transformers, after producer Steven Spielberg asked them to come in for a meeting. The movie took $710 million at the box office. Orci's first credit solely as a producer came with the film Eagle Eye, where he worked once again alongside Kurtzman. He said in an interview with the magazine Extra that he had previously been involved in productions where the producers had writing backgrounds and had looked to them for help, and he was happy to provide that same support to the writers on Eagle Eye. The director of the film, D. J. Caruso, praised the duo saying that "What's unusually cool about them is that they have maintained the producer-writer power that they earned in television and carried that over into the feature film area, and that is extremely rare." Following their work on Eagle Eye, they were executive producers on the Sandra Bullock film, The Proposal.

Orci and Kurtzman were asked to write the script for a new Star Trek film, but initially declined, despite Orci being a fan of the series. Orci suggested rebooting the timeline as seen previously in the films and television series, and adding the return of Leonard Nimoy as Spock from Star Trek: The Original Series. He considered the first two films in the reboot series to be the origin story for the crew, and that the third film would start where the crew was at the beginning of Star Trek: The Original Series. Orci felt that the relationship between the James T. Kirk and the younger Spock was reflective of the partnership of himself and Kurtzman, he said that "We didn't even realize we were writing about ourselves until we were halfway through the script, that was a little embarrassing.

In June 2009, Star Trek was the biggest grossing film at the domestic box-office in the United States, resulting in a sequel being greenlit by the studio and Kurtzman and Orci being asked to write it. The studio set aside a larger budget for the sequel, which was revealed by Orci in an interview with TrekMovie.com. Orci ruled out the "hero quitting" staple of a second movie, which had featured in the Transformers sequel, saying that the crew of the Enterprise were committed and that type of story doesn't have to apply to all sequels. During the production of the film, called Star Trek Into Darkness, Orci was one of the production team who did not disclose much about the villain in the film and denied that Benedict Cumberbatch was to play Khan Noonian Singh.

The criticism of the sequel resulted in Orci posting controversial comments on a Star Trek fan site. In response to a fan upset over Into Darkness, Orci called him a "shitty fan". He later apologized and deactivated his Twitter account.

=== The company itself ===
In 2004, Kurtzman and Orci launched their own production company, signing a first-look deal with DreamWorks Pictures to produce feature films for the studio, after doing a successful rewrite on three of its films, The Island, The Legend of Zorro and Mission: Impossible III. The studio successfully developed its first feature film, Eagle Eye in 2008.

In 2009, Bobby Cohen joined the company, becoming the CEO of its films division.

In 2010, it was announced that Kurtzman and Orci had signed a three-year development deal with 20th Century Fox Television, to produce television shows for its cable and networks, who had just came off the success of Fringe, resulting in the development of Hawaii Five-0 and Transformers: Prime.

Heather Kadin, who was formerly employee of Warner Bros. Television, joined the company that same year, becoming president of the television division.

In 2011, it attempted to move over its film unit from DreamWorks to Skydance Productions, but it failed. In 2012, the studio successfully signed a deal with Universal Pictures to produce its feature films.

In 2013, Fox announced that they would pick up a television series by Kurtzman and Orci, Sleepy Hollow.

Later that same year, Kurtzman and Orci confirmed that the company's television division would move over from 20th Century Fox Television to CBS Television Studios.

=== Dissolution ===
In April 2014, Orci and Kurtzman confirmed to Variety that they would no longer work together on film projects, but would still collaborate on television. Kurtzman wanted to work on the Spider-Man film franchise, while Orci was announced as director for Star Trek 3. Orci confirmed later that year in July that he was not involved in the production of The Amazing Spider-Man 3 alongside Kurtzman. Orci and Kurtzman's K/O Paper Products continued to operate as a production company within CBS Television Studios, and had created the series Scorpion, inspired by the life of Walter O'Brien, as well as Limitless, based on the 2011 film.

Prior to the split of Kurtzman and Orci, the duo were to return to write the third film in the new Star Trek series. In May 2014, Skydance and Paramount Pictures announced that Orci was to direct the third installment of the Star Trek reboot franchise, after Abrams moved on to direct Star Wars: The Force Awakens. This would have marked Orci's directorial debut, and he was to write the script alongside JD Payne and Patrick McKay. Due to his commitment to Star Trek 3, he withdrew from a new Power Rangers film, on which he would have been executive producer. But on December 5, it was announced he would no longer be directing the Star Trek film. He remains credited as a producer on the film, and was replaced by Doug Jung and cast member Simon Pegg as the script writers after Orci's initial script was dropped. Orci was replaced as director by Justin Lin, who had previously directed films in The Fast and the Furious franchise.

Orci created Matador with the idea that the main character would be a "soccer player by day who is a spy by night", and called him a "Latin James Bond". The series was broadcast on the El Rey Network created by Robert Rodriguez. It was renewed for a second season shortly before the pilot was broadcast, which had been directed by Rodriguez. But, following the production of the first season, the series was cancelled despite the earlier renewal. This decision was blamed on poor international sales.

=== Television only ===
On June 27, 2014, it was announced that Aaron Baiers, at the time was Director of TV development, would become the vice president of the TV division under Heather Kadin. In 2016, it was announced that Kurtzman and Orci were to dissolve their television partnership, thus rendering the company defunct.

== Filmography ==
Release	TV and Internet	Film
2008–2013	Fringe	
2008	Eagle Eye	
2009	The Proposal	
2009	Star Trek	
2010–2020	Hawaii Five-0	
2010–2013	Transformers: Prime	
2011	Cowboys & Aliens	
2011	Exit Strategy	
2011	Locke & Key	
2012	People Like Us	
2013	Star Trek Into Darkness	
2013	Now You See Me	
2013	Ender's Game	
2013	Transformers Prime Beast Hunters: Predacons Rising	
2013–2017	Sleepy Hollow	
2014	The Amazing Spider-Man 2	
2014	Matador	
2014–2018	Scorpion	
2015–2016	Limitless	
2016	Now You See Me 2	
