= Now You See Me 2 =

2016 film by Jon M. Chu

- Theatrical release poster
- Directed by: Jon M. Chu
- Screenplay by: Ed Solomon
- Story by: Ed Solomon; Peter Chiarelli
- Based on: Characters by Boaz Yakin; Edward Ricourt
- Produced by: Alex Kurtzman; Roberto Orci; Bobby Cohen
- Starring: Jesse Eisenberg; Mark Ruffalo; Woody Harrelson; Dave Franco; Daniel Radcliffe; Lizzy Caplan; Jay Chou; Sanaa Lathan; Michael Caine; Morgan Freeman
- Cinematography: Peter Deming
- Edited by: Stan Salfas
- Music by: Brian Tyler
- Production companies: Summit Entertainment; K/O Paper Products; TIK Films
- Distributed by: Lionsgate
- Release dates: June 6, 2016 (New York City); June 10, 2016 (United States)
- Running time: 129 minutes
- Country: United States
- Language: English
- Budget: $90–120 million
- Box office: $334.9 million

Now You See Me 2 (also known as Now You See Me: The Second Act) is a 2016 American heist film directed by Jon M. Chu from a screenplay by Ed Solomon and a story by Solomon and Peter Chiarelli. It serves as a sequel to Now You See Me (2013) and the second installment in the Now You See Me series. The film stars an ensemble cast that includes Jesse Eisenberg, Mark Ruffalo, Woody Harrelson, Dave Franco, Ben Lamb, Daniel Radcliffe, Lizzy Caplan, Jay Chou, Sanaa Lathan, Michael Caine, and Morgan Freeman. The plot has the Four Horsemen and their leader Dylan Rhodes recruited by Walter Mabry, a criminal mastermind, to steal a data chip.

In July 2013, the film was officially announced to be in development. Filming began in November 2014 and lasted until May 2015. The film was released on June 10, 2016, by Lionsgate. It received mixed reviews from critics, but was a commercial success and grossed $334 million worldwide. A sequel, Now You See Me: Now You Don't, was released on November 14, 2025.

== Plot ==
Eighteen months after escaping the FBI, the fugitive Four Horsemen—J. Daniel Atlas, Merritt McKinney, Jack Wilder, and new member Lula May—await orders from the Eye, the secret society of magicians. Their handler, FBI Special Agent Dylan Shrike, delivers instructions on their latest mission: to expose corrupt tech CEO Owen Case, whose latest cell phone will secretly collect users' personal data to sell on the black market.

In New York City, the Horsemen hijack the phone's launch but are interrupted by a mysterious figure who reveals to the public that Jack faked his death and that Dylan is working with the Horsemen. Dylan eludes the FBI as the Horsemen escape down a construction chute only to find themselves in Macau suddenly. They are captured by Chase, Merritt's twin brother, and brought to Walter Mabry, Owen's former business partner. Having exposed the Horsemen in New York, Walter reveals how they were lulled unconscious and flown to Macau. Owen took his company from him and a chip designed by Walter to access any computer system worldwide. Despite the protests of the other Horsemen, Daniel agrees to steal the chip for Walter before Owen can sell it.

The Horsemen acquire supplies from a magic store owned by Li and Bu Bu and arrange to deliver the chip to the Eye, knowing they cannot trust Walter. Posing as potential buyers, they infiltrate the Macau Science Center, using cardistry and sleight of hand to sneak the chip past its supervisor, Allen Scott-Frank. Meanwhile, Dylan contacts Thaddeus Bradley, the magic debunker he framed, for help finding the Horsemen in exchange for freeing him from prison. In Macau, Dylan meets Daniel to give the chip to the Eye. Walter deceives Daniel into thinking he is in touch with the Eye, leading to a fight as Daniel escapes with the chip. Captured, Dylan learns Walter is Arthur Tressler's son, whose fortune was stolen by Dylan and the Horsemen. Walter and Arthur lock Dylan in a safe and drown him, mirroring his father's fate. Arthur pays Thaddeus for bringing him Dylan and promises him the rest when he brings him the Horsemen. After escaping, Dylan is rescued by the Horsemen, who realize their chip is fake and decide to stop Walter from obtaining the real one, joined by Li and Bu Bu.

The Horsemen announce a performance in London, threatening to expose Walter, who flies there with Arthur and Chase on a private jet. On New Year's Eve, they perform across the city but are captured by Walter's men and brought to the plane. In the air, they are forced to surrender the fake chip, which Walter says is accurate. His henchmen then throw Dylan and the Horsemen out of the plane, supposedly to their deaths. However, Walter, Arthur, and Chase realize too late that they never took off; their jet is on a set floating on the Thames. The Horsemen and Dylan reveal how they misled Walter's team and how Jack hypnotized Chase into throwing them out of the plane. Walter, Arthur, and Chase's wrongdoings are broadcast worldwide as they are taken into FBI custody, while Dylan and the Horsemen escape apprehension.

Arriving at the Greenwich Observatory, they meet other Eye members, including Li, Bu Bu, and Allen. Their leader is revealed to be Thaddeus, who explains to Dylan that he was Lionel's partner in magic and only pretended to be his rival. They reconcile; Thaddeus chooses Dylan as his successor and the Horsemen are shown a secret entrance to see more of the Eye.

== Cast ==
- Jesse Eisenberg as J. Daniel Atlas, a member of the Four Horsemen.
- Mark Ruffalo as Dylan Rhodes Shrike, a former FBI agent, the new leader of the Four Horsemen and the son of the late illusionist Lionel Shrike.
- Woody Harrelson as Merritt McKinney, a member of the Four Horsemen, and Chase McKinney, an associate of Mabry. They are twin brothers who specialize in hypnosis.
- Dave Franco as Jack Wilder, a magician specializing in card tricks. He is a member of the Four Horsemen.
- Daniel Radcliffe as Walter Mabry, Arthur Tressler's illegitimate son, a young technology tycoon.
- Lizzy Caplan as Lula May, a new member of the Four Horsemen, replacing Henley.
- Jay Chou as Li, a Macanese magic shop owner and member of the Eye.
- Sanaa Lathan as Deputy Director Natalie Austin, an FBI deputy director who tracks down Rhodes for helping the Horsemen.
- Michael Caine as Arthur Tressler, the Four Horsemen's former sponsor, who wants revenge for losing his money and power.
- Morgan Freeman as Thaddeus Bradley, a magic debunker, exposing the tricks of other magicians; the grandmaster of the Eye and a friend of Lionel Shrike.
- David Warshofsky as Agent Cowan, an FBI agent and a skeptic of Rhodes'.
- Tsai Chin as Bu Bu, Li's grandmother, who owns a magic shop in Macau and is also a member of the Eye.
- Richard Laing as Lionel Shrike, a magician who drowned while performing an escape trick thirty years ago, and Dylan's late father. The character was previously played by an uncredited Elias Koteas in the first film.
- Henry Lloyd-Hughes as Allen Scott-Frank, head of the Macau Science Center and member of the Eye.
- Ben Lamb as Owen Case, Walter's former business partner.

== Production ==
On July 3, 2013, after the box office success of the first film, Lions Gate Entertainment CEO Jon Feltheimer confirmed that there would be a sequel to the film, with production beginning in 2014 for an unspecified release date. In September 2014, it was confirmed that Jon M. Chu would replace Louis Leterrier (who eventually serves as executive producer) as the sequel's director. The film was produced by Summit Entertainment and K/O Paper Products.

The sequel was thought to be titled Now You See Me: Now You Don't, with the director pushing for that name, but the studio call announced in November 2014 was that the film had changed its title to Now You See Me: The Second Act. The title was eventually used for the third film.

=== Casting ===
On October 2, 2014, Michael Caine confirmed in an interview that Daniel Radcliffe would be playing his son in the film and that shooting is expected to begin in December in London. In October 2014, it was announced that Isla Fisher would be unable to reprise her role as Henley Reeves due to her pregnancy and Lizzy Caplan was cast as new character Lula to replace her as the Fourth Horseman. On January 28, 2015, Henry Lloyd-Hughes was confirmed to play the role of a tech whiz kid named Allen Scott-Frank. On December 22, 2014, it was reported that Morgan Freeman was not going to reprise his role as Thaddeus Bradley, but on January 19, 2015, film director Chu posted a selfie with Freeman on his Instagram, verifying that he would return.

=== Filming ===
On November 25, 2014, Mark Ruffalo posted to his Facebook that filming had begun on the sequel, as the film was shooting in London, England. On March 12, 2015, shooting began in China, where filming took place in Macau and the Macau Science Center, lasting for six days to March 18.

== Music ==
=== Theme song ===
The Taiwanese singer Jay Chou, who made a guest appearance, produced the international theme song "Now you see me" in Chinese for the film (the film is in Chinese, and the album version has English lyrics). The director even added Jay Chou's songs "Eunuch with a Headache" (the song Lee listened to at the counter when he debuted) and "Extra Large Shoes" as episodes. In addition, Taiwanese rap group "urchin MJ116" and rapper MC HotDog's song "Fresh Gang" also played in the film's Macau segment.

=== Soundtrack ===
The film's music was written and composed by Brian Tyler. The soundtrack was released on June 10, 2016, by Varèse Sarabande.

== Release ==
In November 2014, the film was officially titled Now You See Me 2, and was set to be released on June 10, 2016. In March 2016, the film's international release date was announced as July 4, 2016.

Now You See Me 2 was released on Digital HD on August 19, and on Ultra HD Blu-ray, Blu-ray and DVD on September 6 by Lionsgate Home Entertainment.

== Reception ==
=== Box office ===
Now You See Me 2 grossed $65.1 million in the United States and Canada and $269.8 million in other territories for a worldwide total of $334.9 million, against a budget of $120 million.

In the United States and Canada, Now You See Me 2 opened on June 10, 2016, alongside Warcraft and The Conjuring 2, and was projected to gross $23–26 million from 3,232 theaters in its opening weekend. The film grossed $1.8 million from its Thursday night previews, beating the $1.5 million made by its predecessor, and $8.4 million on its first day. It went on to gross $22.3 million in its opening weekend, finishing third at the box office behind The Conjuring 2 ($40.4 million) and Warcraft ($24.1 million).

In China, the film was released on June 24, 2016, and had an opening day of $14.8 million, a record for Lionsgate and up 67.9% from the original's first day. In its opening weekend the film grossed $44.4 million, also a record for Lionsgate. China was the largest territory for the film, with a total gross of $97.1 million.

=== Critical response ===
On Rotten Tomatoes, the film has an approval percentage of 34% based on 197 reviews and an average rating of 4.90/10. The critics consensus reads: "Now You See Me 2 packs in even more twists and turns than its predecessor, but in the end, it has even less hiding up its sleeve." On Metacritic, the film has a score of 46 out of 100 based on 33 critic reviews, indicating "mixed or average" reviews. Audiences polled by CinemaScore gave the film an average grade of "A−" on an A+ to F scale.

Although critics and fans were disappointed that Isla Fisher was not returning as Henley Reeves, many praised Lizzy Caplan's addition to the cast. Caplan was described as "one of the sequel's biggest improvements" by Entertainment Weekly, while Dave White of TheWrap wrote that she "provides a fresh infusion of smart-ass energy into the boy's club." Australian film magazine Filmink also noted that Caplan "over-shadows her skilled co-stars with her sassy and commanding screen presence." Owen Gleiberman of Variety wrote that "all bearded creepy grins, [Daniel Radcliffe] makes Walter a megalomaniac imp, like the world's youngest Bond villain." Randy Cordova of The Arizona Republic, who preferred the film to the original, said of the villain character that "In [Radcliffe's] hands, he is a spoiled and petulant baddie, alternately creepy and hilarious."

Ignatiy Vishnevetsky of The A.V. Club wrote that the sequel "up[s] the ludicrous quotient" from the original, "double-timing the convoluted plotting and embracing implausibility as an aesthetic ... If [director Jon M.] Chu doesn't seem comfortable with the swooping, lens-flare-speckled flashiness that director Louis Leterrier brought to the first film, he seems even less interested than his predecessor in creating the impression of a recognizably real world — which is a good thing, at least for a movie about a superstar heist crew called the Horsemen that involves twins, multiple secret identities, and a global corporate surveillance plot that can only be foiled through the use of stage magic."

Michael Phillips of the Chicago Tribune gave the film a mixed review, but considered it "more fun" than its predecessor.

=== Accolades ===
At the Teen Choice Awards held on July 31, 2016, the film was nominated as Choice Summer Movie, Dave Franco was nominated as Choice Summer Movie Star: Male and Lizzy Caplan was nominated as Choice Summer Movie Star: Female.

== Future ==
=== Sequel ===
In May 2015, Lions Gate Entertainment CEO Jon Feltheimer announced that they had "already begun early planning" for a sequel called Now You See Me 3. It was later confirmed that Lizzy Caplan would reprise the role of Lula May. Lionsgate revealed in April 2020 that Eric Warren Singer would be the screenwriter for the film. In September 2022, it was announced that Ruben Fleischer would direct the film while Seth Grahame-Smith replaced Singer as the screenwriter. By March 2024, Eisenberg had read the screenplay for a third film and was hopeful that principal photography would begin "in the next six months". On April 16, it was announced that Ariana Greenblatt, Dominic Sessa, and Justice Smith had been cast in the film, alongside the returning Eisenberg, Harrelson, Franco, Caplan, Isla Fisher, and Ruffalo. On May 2, Rosamund Pike was confirmed to have joined the third installment. On July 2, Lionsgate announced that Now You See Me 3 would be released on November 14, 2025.

=== Spin-off film ===
In July 2016, The Hollywood Reporter reported that Lionsgate plans on making a Now You See Me spin-off with a primarily Chinese cast, starring Jay Chou as Li, his character from Now You See Me 2.
