= He's Watching =

2022 American found footage horror film

- Official release poster
- Directed by: Jacob Aaron Estes
- Written by: Jacob Aaron Estes
- Produced by: Jacob Aaron Estes; Iris Serena Estes; Lucas Steel Estes; Gretchen Lieberum
- Starring: Iris Serena Estes; Lucas Steel Estes
- Cinematography: Jacob Aaron Estes
- Edited by: Jacob Aaron Estes
- Music by: Keefus Ciancia
- Production company: XYZ Films
- Release date: 21 July 2022
- Country: United States
- Language: English

He's Watching is a 2022 American found footage horror film written and directed by Jacob Aaron Estes, starring Iris Serena Estes and Lucas Steel Estes.

The film was released on July 21, 2022, and received generally positive reviews from critics.

== Plot ==
A brother and sister discover a presence in their home while their parents are in the hospital suffering a mystery illness that seems to only affect adults. The siblings team up to discover what the presence is and how to escape it.

== Cast ==
- Iris Serena Estes as Iris Serena Estes
- Lucas Steel Estes as Lucas Steel Estes

== Release ==
The film was released to video on demand on 21 July 2022.

== Reception ==
On review aggregator website Rotten Tomatoes, the film holds an approval rating of 90% based on 10 reviews, with an average rating of 6.5/10.

Chad Collins of Dread Central rated the film four stars out of five, writing: "Hypnotic and unique, He’s Watching is a testament to the staying power of found footage". Emily von Seele of the Daily Dead rated the film 3.5 stars out of five. The film received a positive review in Screen Anarchy.
