= Now You See Me: Now You Don't =

2025 film by Ruben Fleischer

- Theatrical release poster
- Directed by: Ruben Fleischer
- Screenplay by: Michael Lesslie; Paul Wernick; Rhett Reese; Seth Grahame-Smith
- Story by: Eric Warren Singer; Michael Lesslie
- Based on: Characters by: Boaz Yakin; Edward Ricourt
- Produced by: Bobby Cohen; Alex Kurtzman; Roberto Orci
- Starring: Jesse Eisenberg; Woody Harrelson; Dave Franco; Isla Fisher; Justice Smith; Dominic Sessa; Ariana Greenblatt; Lizzy Caplan; Rosamund Pike; Morgan Freeman
- Cinematography: George Richmond
- Edited by: Stacey Schroeder
- Music by: Brian Tyler
- Production companies: Summit Entertainment; Cohen Pictures
- Distributed by: Lionsgate
- Release dates: November 11, 2025 (Harbour Club Amsterdam); November 14, 2025 (United States)
- Running time: 112 minutes
- Country: United States
- Language: English
- Budget: $90 million
- Box office: $246.6 million

Now You See Me: Now You Don't is a 2025 American heist film directed by Ruben Fleischer from a screenplay by Michael Lesslie, the writing duo of Paul Wernick and Rhett Reese, and Seth Grahame-Smith, based on a story by Eric Warren Singer and Lesslie. The film is the sequel to Now You See Me 2 (2016) and the third installment in the Now You See Me film series. The cast includes Jesse Eisenberg, Woody Harrelson, Dave Franco, Isla Fisher, Lizzy Caplan, and Morgan Freeman returning from previous films, joined by new cast members Justice Smith, Dominic Sessa, Ariana Greenblatt, and Rosamund Pike.

Now You See Me: Now You Don't premiered at the Harbour Club in Amsterdam, Netherlands, on November 11, 2025, and was released in the United States on November 14, 2025, by Lionsgate. The film grossed $246 million worldwide and received mixed reviews from critics. A sequel is in development.

== Plot ==
Ten years after the Horsemen's last performance, (Note: as depicted in Now You See Me 2 (2016)) three young illusionists—Charlie, Bosco, and June—impersonate the Horsemen using deepfakes and holograms to drain a corrupt cryptocurrency exchange owner's wallet and share the stolen funds. They are approached by the real J. Daniel Atlas—the foreman of the Horsemen—who reveals he was sent by the Eye, a secret society of magicians, via a tarot card to recruit them for a mission to steal the Heart Diamond from Veronika Vanderberg, the head of a South African diamond company formed by her late father that provides money laundering services for criminals. Meanwhile, Veronika receives a phone call from someone who threatens to expose her crimes unless she delivers the Diamond to them.

At a private party in Antwerp, where the Diamond is being displayed, Daniel and the three young illusionists execute a heist to steal the Diamond. Veronika's security and the police fail to apprehend them as three other Horsemen—Jack Wilder, Henley Reeves, and Merritt McKinney—arrive to help, each having also received a tarot card from the Eye. The Horsemen recount a heist gone wrong that led to their leader, Dylan Shrike, being incarcerated in a Russian prison and the team falling apart.

The tarot cards, when brought together, direct the group to a château in France, where they are greeted by friend of the Horsemen Thaddeus Bradley, who was also contacted by the Eye. Charlie and Bosco find Veronika's client list and evidence of her illegal activities behind a painting. The police, who are on Veronika's payroll, raid the estate, forcing the group to split up to avoid capture. Merritt, Jack, and June are caught, while Charlie, Bosco, Daniel, and Henley escape through a tunnel. Thaddeus is fatally shot while fleeing.

At the police station, Veronika interrogates Merritt, who deduces that her father's affair led to her mother's suicide and that Veronika murdered her housekeeper and the housekeeper’s son. Lula May—another Horseman—frees Jack and June, but Merritt is unable to escape. Veronika and the Horsemen agree to meet at the Yas Marina Circuit in Abu Dhabi, where a party is being held for Veronika's Formula One team, to secure Merritt's release in exchange for the Diamond. Bosco and Charlie create a distraction by stealing Veronika's Formula One car and driving off, triggering a police chase; meanwhile, Veronika traps the Horsemen in a glass tank, seeking to bury them alive in sand. She leaves with the Diamond and arranges to meet with the unknown caller at her vault. The Horsemen manage to escape by breaking a water pipe and using Henley's diamond wedding ring to shatter the glass.

Veronika arrives at the vault and takes a gun from a guard. She discovers that the mysterious caller is Charlie, who reveals himself to be Veronika's half-brother. A tearful Veronika apologizes and hands Charlie the Diamond before shooting him. Charlie performs a bullet catch trick, revealing that Veronika has been firing blanks, and the walls fall open to reveal a Horsemen stage with a live audience. Charlie reveals himself as the mastermind who had enlisted the Horsemen by posing as the Eye, seeking to exact revenge for his mother's death, and that Veronika had been secretly transported to the stage under the guise of a fake sandstorm. He pledges to bring Veronika's clients to justice and return their proceeds to the people of South Africa.

Some time later, the Horsemen gather at Charlie, June, and Bosco's hideout, where Jack and Lula rekindle their relationship. A package arrives at the door containing a hologram projector of Dylan, who reveals he had faked his imprisonment and inducts Charlie, Bosco, and June into the Eye.

== Cast ==
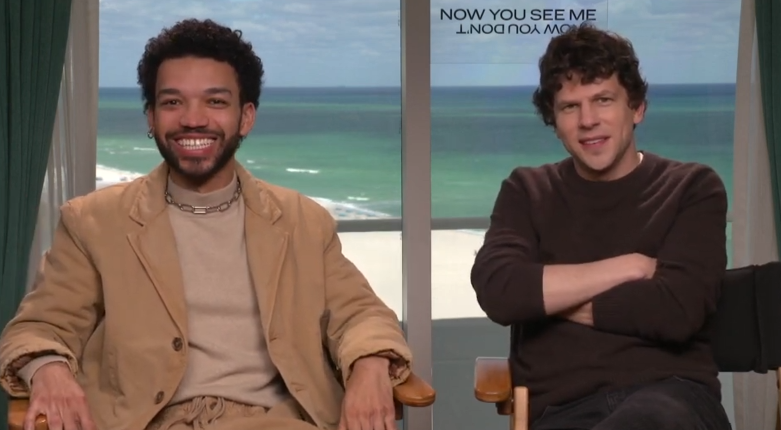
Justice Smith and Jesse Eisenberg promoting the film

- Jesse Eisenberg as J. Daniel Atlas, the arrogant foreman of the Four Horsemen
- Woody Harrelson as Merritt McKinney, the oldest member of the Horsemen, specializing in mentalism and hypnosis
- Dave Franco as Jack Wilder, the youngest member of the Horsemen, specializing in sleight of hand and cardistry
- Isla Fisher as Henley Reeves, the final member of the original Horsemen, specializing in escapology
- Justice Smith as Charlie, a young magician and magic history enthusiast
- Dominic Sessa as Bosco LeRoy, a young impressionist and friend of Charlie's
- Ariana Greenblatt as June Rouclere, a lockpicker, expert pickpocket, and friend of Charlie's
- Lizzy Caplan as Lula May, a member of the Horsemen who replaced Henley in the second film, specializing in disguises
- Rosamund Pike as Veronika Vanderberg, the head of a South African diamond company involved in money laundering
- Morgan Freeman as Thaddeus Bradley, a grandmaster of the Eye
- Thabang Molaba as Lethabo Khoza, Veronika's right hand man

Additionally, Mark Ruffalo reprises his role as Dylan Shrike, the leader of the Horsemen and grandmaster of the Eye, in a cameo appearance. Andrew Santino appears as Brett Finnegan, a corrupt cryptocurrency exchange owner who was the focal point of Charlie, Bosco, and June's opening heist.

== Production ==
=== Development ===
In May 2015, Lionsgate CEO Jon Feltheimer announced they had "already begun planning" for a sequel to Now You See Me 2 (2016), titled Now You See Me 3. In April 2016, it was announced Jon M. Chu, director of the second installment, would return for the following film. Eric Warren Singer was revealed to be the screenwriter in April 2020. In September 2022, Ruben Fleischer was confirmed to be directing the project, while Seth Grahame-Smith had replaced Singer as screenwriter. The final screenplay was credited to Singer, Grahame-Smith, and Michael Lesslie, with production handled by Bobby Cohen and Alex Kurtzman.

The film was co-financed by Media Capital Technologies.

In April 2025, the film's official title was revealed to be Now You See Me: Now You Don't. Chu had previously pushed for the second installment to have this title, but it was rejected at the time for marketing reasons.

=== Filming ===
Principal photography began in July 2024 in Budapest, Hungary, with George Richmond serving as cinematographer. Places shot in Hungary include the Museum of Fine Arts, the roof of the Budapest University of Technology and Economics, and the Danube river for the boat scene. For the Chateau de Roussillon in France, director Ruben Fleischer explained that they used exterior shots of the Nádasdy Castle, also in Hungary, and built the interiors on two stages at Stern Studios. For the construction of the magical sets inside the Chateau the production team consulted with the Museum of Illusions Budapest, to make sure that illusions were constructed correctly. The French Police station was filmed in a closed down museum in Szentendre, a small town located outside of Budapest.

Additional location shooting took place in Antwerp, Belgium, filming outside areas of Grote Markt and Central Station, from August 28 to September 1, 2024. To take advantage of rebates offered by the Abu Dhabi Film Commission, filming took place at Louvre Abu Dhabi and Yas Island locations including Ferrari World, Yas Marina Circuit and CLYMB Abu Dhabi. Filming officially wrapped on November 18, 2024.

=== Music ===
On June 17, 2025, it was confirmed that Brian Tyler, the composer of the first two films, would be returning to compose the film's score.

== Release ==
=== Theatrical ===
Now You See Me: Now You Don't premiered at the Harbour Club in Amsterdam, Netherlands, on November 11, 2025, and was released theatrically in the United States on November 14.

=== Home media ===
Now You See Me: Now You Don't was released on Digital HD on December 16, 2025, and on Ultra HD Blu-ray, Blu-ray and DVD on February 17, 2026.

== Reception ==
=== Box office ===
Now You See Me: Now You Don't grossed $61.9 million in the United States and Canada, and $184.7 million in other territories, for a worldwide total of $246.6 million.

In the United States and Canada, Now You See Me: Now You Don't was released alongside The Running Man and Keeper, and was projected to gross $20–25 million in its opening weekend. The film made $2.1 million in Thursday box office previews. The film would go on to make $21 million at the domestic box office in its opening weekend, finishing at the top.

=== Critical response ===
On the review aggregator website Rotten Tomatoes, 61% of 148 critics' reviews are positive, with an average rating of 5.6/10. The website's consensus reads: "Getting the gang back together, Now You See Me: Now You Don't repeats a lot of the franchise's familiar tricks, although there's still charm in seeing these characters pull the proverbial rabbit out of the hat." Metacritic, which uses a weighted average, assigned the film a score of 50 out of 100, based on 34 critics, indicating "mixed or average" reviews. Audiences polled by CinemaScore gave the film an average grade of "B+" on an A+ to F scale, down from the "A-" earned by its predecessors, and a definite recommend score of 63%.

=== Accolades ===
The film was nominated for Best Action / Adventure Film at the 53rd Saturn Awards.

== Sequel ==
In April 2025, during Lionsgate's presentation at CinemaCon, a fourth installment in the Now You See Me franchise was announced to be in development. Ruben Fleischer is set to return as director.
