= Don't Let Go (2019 film) =

- Theatrical release poster
- Directed by: Jacob Aaron Estes
- Screenplay by: Jacob Aaron Estes
- Story by: Jacob Aaron Estes; Drew Daywalt
- Produced by: Jason Blum; Bobby Cohen; David Oyelowo
- Starring: David Oyelowo; Mykelti Williamson; Brian Tyree Henry; Shinelle Azoroh; April Grace; Byron Mann; Storm Reid; Alfred Molina
- Cinematography: Sharone Meir
- Edited by: Scott D. Hanson; Billy Fox
- Music by: Ethan Gold
- Production companies: Blumhouse Productions; Briarcliff Entertainment
- Distributed by: OTL Releasing; BH Tilt
- Release dates: January 27, 2019 (Sundance); August 30, 2019 (United States)
- Running time: 107 minutes
- Country: United States
- Language: English
- Budget: $5 million
- Box office: $5.3 million

Don't Let Go is a 2019 American science fiction horror thriller film written and directed by Jacob Aaron Estes. The film stars David Oyelowo, Storm Reid, Alfred Molina, Brian Tyree Henry, Byron Mann, Mykelti Williamson, and Shinelle Azoroh. Jason Blum serves as a producer through his Blumhouse Productions banner, alongside Bobby Cohen and Oyelowo.

The film premiered under the title Relive at the 2019 Sundance Film Festival on January 27, 2019. It was released on August 30, 2019, by OTL Releasing and BH Tilt.

== Plot ==
Homicide detective Jack Radcliff receives a call from his niece Ashley. Her father, Garret (Jack's brother), has forgotten to pick her up. Ashley and Jack eat at a diner, and Jack promises to talk to his brother, a former drug dealer on medication for bipolar disorder, about being responsible. The following night, Jack receives a short, garbled call from a frightened Ashley. He goes to Ashley's home and finds Garret, Ashley’s mother Susan and Ashley herself, as well as the family's dog, all shot dead. The police rule the case a murder-suicide by Garret. Despite consolation from his partner Bobby, who has been assigned the case, Jack blames himself; he is convinced that his stern talk with Garret sparked his horrific actions.

Two weeks later, Jack begins receiving calls from Ashley's phone, even though the line has been disconnected. When he answers, Ashley speaks to him as though nothing is wrong. Jack soon realizes that he is somehow communicating through the phone with Ashley from several days before her murder. Ashley herself is oblivious to her fate and does not know she is speaking to Jack in the future. Jack does not tell Ashley the confusing truth but hopes that with his guidance she can alter events to prevent the murder-suicide. From this point forward, the film cuts between Jack in the present and Ashley in the past.

As Jack in the present investigates leads Ashley uncovers in the past, he becomes convinced that Garret was framed for the crime. Jack finds reference to a "Georgie;" his captain, Howard, tells Jack that Georgie is a possibly mythical drug kingpin whom rumours have been tied to numerous major drug deals for years. Jack is convinced that the mysterious Georgie is the real murderer.

While investigating, Jack is fatally wounded in a drive-by shooting. As he is dying, Ashley calls him, and he orders her to call the police to arrest her father for drug possession and tells her to call his partner Bobby if she thinks she is in danger. Jack hopes that these actions will prevent Ashley's murder; instead, only the date and specific details of the triple homicide change. Ashley altering the past also changes Jack's own past actions, meaning that he is not shot and is unharmed. When he realises that Ashley's murder now occurred a day earlier, the day that Ashley is currently in, Jack tells Ashley the truth about their phone calls and her fate. He begs her to leave town to survive, and she agrees.

Jack meets with Howard and Bobby, who reveal that "Georgie" is not a person, but a group of crooked cops. Howard and Bobby have been helping internal affairs track down this conspiracy within the department. They take Jack to a discreet location to discuss the investigation. Bobby suddenly shoots Howard dead, revealing that he is a member of the Georgie conspiracy. He was tasked with eliminating Garret, after Garret refused to assist them with a major drug deal. Bobby was the one who killed the family and framed Garret.

Meanwhile, in the past, Ashley has called Bobby for a ride home, planning to have him protect her family. However, when they arrive, Bobby shoots Garret and Susan dead with a shotgun, Ashley flees. In the present, Bobby, assuming that all Jack's evidence must come from an informant, demands to know who Jack's witness is. Jack then receives a call from Ashley which he answers, holding up the phone for Bobby to hear. He urges Ashley to save herself, which will save him. Bobby prepares to shoot Jack. In the past, Ashley leads the pursuing Bobby to Jack's home. He comes out and sees his blood-covered partner preparing to shoot Ashley. Finally, Jack fatally shoots Bobby, which erases the future where Bobby holds Jack at gunpoint. Jack comforts a tearful Ashley.

== Cast ==
- David Oyelowo as Detective Jack Radcliff, Ashley's uncle and Garret's younger brother
- Storm Reid as Ashley Radcliff, Garret's daughter and Jack's niece
- Byron Mann as Sergeant Roger Martin
- Mykelti Williamson as Bobby Owens
- Alfred Molina as Howard Keleshian, Jack and Bobby's boss
- Brian Tyree Henry as Garret Radcliff, Ashley's father, Susan’s husband and Jack's brother
- Shinelle Azoroh as Susan Radcliff, Ashley’s mother and Garret’s wife
- April Grace as Sergeant Julia Rodriguez
- Omar Leyva as Property Officer 1
- Sarkis Ninos as Property Officer 2
- Ray Barnes as Reverend Ray
- Daniel R. Lawson Jr. as Dinner Patron

== Production ==
On April 17, 2017, it was announced that David Oyelowo was starring and executive producing the film with Jacob Aaron Estes writing and directing. On July 18, 2017, it was announced that Storm Reid is co-starring with Oyelowo. On July 25, 2017, it was announced that Brian Tyree Henry, Alfred Molina and Mykelti Williamson are also starring in the film.

Principal photography on the film began in July 2017.

== Release ==
Don't Let Go was released on August 30, 2019.

== Reception ==
=== Box office ===
The film made over $5.3 million on 922 theatres in worldwide and domestic box office during wide release, finishing forty-sixth at the box office.

=== Critical response ===
On Rotten Tomatoes, the film has an approval rating 42% based on 90 reviews, with an average rating of 5/10, The website’s critical consensus reads: "While admirably intelligent and well-cast, Don't Let Go suffers from a formulaic approach compounded by its uneven writing and an awkward tonal balance". On Metacritic, the film has a weighted average score of 49 out of 100, based on 22 critics, indicating "mixed or average" reviews. Audiences polled by PostTrak gave the film an average 3 out of 5 stars, with 46% saying they would definitely recommend it to a friend.

== See also ==
- The Phone
- Frequency
- List of black films of the 2010s
