= Gretchen Lieberum =

American jazz musician

Gretchen Lieberum is a singer and songwriter.

== Career ==
Lieberum was raised in Berkeley, California and educated at University of California, Santa Cruz.

After leading a funk band for several years, she released her first solo album, Three A.M. (1999) followed by Brand New Morning (2002), both produced by Greg Porée. Her albums Siren Songs (2005) and When This Kiss Is Over It Will Start Again (2009) were independently released in the United States.

Lieberum has been a member of Princess, a Prince cover band formed with comedian Maya Rudolph. She and Rudolph became friends while they were students at UC Santa Cruz. At the time, they were members of a funk band named Supersauce, where they discovered their mutual interest in Prince. They have performed at the Hollywood Bowl and on the TV show Late Night with Jimmy Fallon.

== Personal life ==
Lieberum is married to filmmaker Jacob Aaron Estes.

== Discography ==
- Three A.M. (1999)
- Brand New Morning (Lakeshore, 2002)
- Siren Songs (Nomadic, 2005)
- When This Kiss Is Over It Will Start Again (Gogogerty, 2009)
