= People Like Us (2012 film) =

2012 film directed by Alex Kurtzman

- Theatrical release poster
- Directed by: Alex Kurtzman
- Written by: Alex Kurtzman; Roberto Orci; Jody Lambert
- Produced by: Roberto Orci; Bobby Cohen; Clayton Townsend; Alex Kurtzman
- Starring: Chris Pine; Elizabeth Banks; Olivia Wilde; Jon Favreau; Michael Hall D'Addario; Michelle Pfeiffer
- Cinematography: Salvatore Totino
- Edited by: Robert Leighton
- Music by: A. R. Rahman
- Production companies: DreamWorks Pictures; Reliance Entertainment; K/O Paper Products
- Distributed by: Walt Disney Studios Motion Pictures (Note: Distributed by Walt Disney Studios Motion Pictures through the Touchstone Pictures banner.)
- Release dates: June 15, 2012 (LA Film Fest); June 29, 2012 (United States)
- Running time: 114 minutes
- Country: United States
- Language: English
- Budget: $16 million
- Box office: $12.6 million

People Like Us (known during production as Welcome to People) is a 2012 American drama film directed by Alex Kurtzman in his directorial debut. The film was written by Kurtzman, Roberto Orci and Jody Lambert, and stars Chris Pine, Elizabeth Banks, Olivia Wilde, Michael Hall D'Addario and Michelle Pfeiffer. A. R. Rahman composed the soundtrack.

While settling his recently deceased father's estate, corporate trader Sam Harper discovers he has a sister whom he never knew existed, once the siblings meet, they both re-examine their views of family and life choices.

The film was released by Walt Disney Studios Motion Pictures through their Touchstone Pictures label on June 29, 2012.

== Plot ==
Sam Harper, a struggling corporate trader in New York City, may have violated federal law and faces a possible Federal Trade Commission investigation, so his boss urges him to bribe federal officials. Returning home, Sam's girlfriend Hannah informs him that his estranged father Jerry has died. They fly to Los Angeles, where he has a tense reunion with his mother Lillian.

Jerry's lawyer and friend Ike tells Sam he will not inherit any money. He then hands him a shaving kit containing $150,000 in cash and a note stipulating that the money be delivered to Josh Davis.

Josh is a troubled 11-year-old, whose bartender mother Frankie Davis is a recovering alcoholic. Sam secretly follows her to an Alcoholics Anonymous meeting. There, he learns Frankie is Jerry's illegitimate daughter, and therefore his paternal half-sister, and Josh his nephew. Sam introduces himself to Frankie as a visiting fellow alcoholic. When he tells Hannah he intends to keep the money, she returns to New York, disgusted.

Sam then introduces himself to Josh, preventing him from shoplifting CDs from a record store. Soon he becomes involved in their lives, gradually growing closer. Helping her with laundry, he learns that Jerry visited her and her mother on Sundays, and that Frankie has never met her father's wife and son.

Meanwhile, Sam broods over his deepening legal troubles. Frankie does not want him around Josh anymore because she fears that when he returns to New York, it will upset her son. Sam decides to leave, but returns to pick up Josh from school, as Frankie later calls him because Josh has been in a fight.

Sam eventually reveals that he is Jerry's son, as Frankie is acting too grateful, resulting in her exploding in anger and ordering him to leave. She then receives Jerry's money through a lawyer. Frankie quits her job, enrolls in school, and moves into a suburban neighborhood with Josh. She cuts contact with Sam.

Later, Lillian is hospitalized due to a heart condition. Hannah finds Sam in the waiting room, and they reconcile. She has enrolled into UCLA's law program to remain close to Sam after realizing he wants to be with his family.

After being discharged from the hospital, Lillian tells Sam that she forced Jerry to choose their family over Frankie and her mother. She was protecting Sam, but Jerry instead rejected his son because he was a reminder of the daughter he abandoned. One day, Josh, who is having difficulty adjusting to Sam's absence, tries to find him after obtaining Lillian's address. He leaves Sam a note with their new address.

When Sam visits Frankie, he asks her forgiveness and wants to be her brother and Josh's uncle and father figure. He shows her an old film reel that Jerry shot of a young Sam at a playground. In the film, a girl joins Sam, and Frankie realizes that Jerry had regularly brought her and Sam to play together and thus loved both his children. At this recognition, Frankie accepts Sam as her brother.

== Cast ==
- Chris Pine as Sam Harper, Jerry's son and Frankie's younger paternal-half brother
- Elizabeth Banks as Frankie Davis, Josh's mother and Sam's older paternal-half sister
- Olivia Wilde as Hannah, Sam's girlfriend
- Michael Hall D'Addario as Josh Alan Davis, Frankie's son and Sam's nephew
- Michelle Pfeiffer as Lillian Harper, Sam's mom
- Mark Duplass as Ted – Neighbor
- Philip Baker Hall as Ike Rafferty – Estate attorney
- Jon Favreau as Richards – Sam's boss
- Sara Mornell as Dr. Amanda – Psychiatrist

== Soundtrack ==
The soundtrack for the film was composed by Academy Award Winner A. R. Rahman. The film marks his first collaboration with Alex Kurtzman. In an interview, Rahman quoted the director's words on film's music: "Alex said [the music] can't be epic, it can't be world music ... I was following his vision, while at the same time sticking to something that I wanted to do." The soundtrack was released 19 June 2012 via Lakeshore Records.

In the movie, when Sam first puts on one of Jerry's records, the song "Fast as a Shark" can be heard in the background.

== Home media ==
People Like Us was released on Blu-ray, DVD, and digital download on 2 October 2012 from Touchstone Home Entertainment. The release was produced in two different physical packages: a 2-disc combo pack (Blu-ray and DVD), and a 1-disc DVD.

== Reception ==
On Rotten Tomatoes, the film holds a rating of 52% based on 117 reviews, with an average score of 5.70/10. The site's critical consensus reads, "Though calculated and melodramatic, People Like Us benefits from a pair of solid leads and its rare screenplay that caters to adult filmgoers." On Metacritic, the film has a score of 49 out of 100, based on 31 critics, indicating "mixed or average reviews".
