= Queens of Country =

- Directed by: Ryan Page; Christopher Pomerenke
- Starring: Lizzy Caplan
- Music by: Isaac Brock
- Release dates: April 12, 2012 (Chicago International Movies and Music Festival)
- Country: United States
- Language: English

Queens of Country is a 2012 American comedy film directed by Ryan Page and Christopher Pomerenke and starring Lizzy Caplan. The film's score was composed by Isaac Brock.

== Cast ==
- Lizzy Caplan as Jolene Gillis
- Ron Livingston as Rance McCoy
- Joe Lo Truglio as Penny McEntire
- Matt Walsh as Cleveland Norvis
- Maynard James Keenan as Bobby Angel
- Wanda Jackson as herself
- Dave Karl as Kenny Rogers

== Release ==
The film premiered on April 12, 2012 at the Chicago International Movies and Music Festival.
