= Abu Dhabi Film Commission =

Government agency

- Type: Government Agency
- Industry: Film & TV
- Founded: 2009
- Headquarters: Abu Dhabi, UAE
- Key people: Sameer Al Jaberi - Head of ADFC
- Parent: Creative Media Authority - Abu Dhabi
- Website: ADFC Website

Abu Dhabi Film Commission (ADFC) is a government agency formed to support the development of Abu Dhabi's film and TV industry. Its mission is to promote the Emirate of Abu Dhabi as a production destination to generate economic benefits for the region and increased job opportunity for its residences. It was established under twofour54 Abu Dhabi in 2009 and is now part of Abu Dhabi’s Creative Media Authority. As part of their efforts to increase film productions in the region, Abu Dhabi Film Commission provides services to production companies such as location scouting, location surveys, script breakdowns, script approval, customs clearance, digital location library, assistance with film and work permits, and the website hosts an industry directory of local talent and crew.

== Incentives ==
The Abu Dhabi Film Commission offers 35%++ cashback rebate on qualifying productions in Abu-Dhabi. As of 1 January 2025, productions can receive up to 50% support, based on a clear set of criteria. The enhanced rebate also includes increased caps and a wider variety of production formats. The rebate was first introduced in 2013 and since then, many major projects have benefitted from support.

== Notable films and TV programmes filmed in Abu Dhabi ==
- Star Wars: The Force Awakens (2015) filmed scenes in the Liwa Oasis in the Emirate of Abu Dhabi in 2014. Lucasfilm chairman Alan Horn confirmed that filming took place in the United Arab Emirates as part of the production’s desert sequences.
- Fast & Furious 7 (2015) filmed sequences in Abu Dhabi in April 2014, with locations including Emirates Palace and Jumeirah at Etihad Towers featured in the film.
- War Machine (2017) The Netflix film, starring Brad Pitt, was filmed in Abu Dhabi and Ras Al Khaimah, with the locations used to represent settings in Afghanistan.
- Tiger Zinda Hai (2017) filmed scenes in Abu Dhabi over a 65-day period, with locations including the Liwa Desert and Al Ain.
- Race 3 (2018) The Hindi-language action film Race 3, starring Salman Khan, was filmed across several locations in Abu Dhabi, including Emirates Palace, Yas Viceroy Abu Dhabi, and the Liwa Desert.
- 6 Underground (2019), directed by Michael Bay, filmed scenes in Abu Dhabi and other locations across the United Arab Emirates, including the Liwa Desert.
- Al Kameen (2021) is an Emirati Arabic-language war drama filmed entirely in the United Arab Emirates. The film became one of the highest-grossing Emirati productions released in the country.
- The Bold and the Beautiful (TV series) Episodes of the American television series The Bold and the Beautiful were filmed in the United Arab Emirates in 2024, with scenes shot in Abu Dhabi and Dubai, including Yas Marina Circuit and Emirates Palace.
- Dune: Part Two (2024) filmed extensive desert scenes in the Liwa Desert, where a purpose-built village set was constructed to support the production. The production involved more than 1,000 cast and crew during its filming period in the Emirate.
- F1: The Movie (2025), directed by Joseph Kosinski and starring Brad Pitt, were filmed at Yas Marina Circuit during Formula One race weekends, including the Abu Dhabi Grand Prix.
- Now You See Me: Now You Don't (2025), the third instalment in the Now You See Me film series, filmed scenes in Abu Dhabi over a 13-day shoot.
