= The Details (film) =

- Theatrical release poster
- Directed by: Jacob Aaron Estes
- Written by: Jacob Aaron Estes
- Produced by: Mark Gordon; Bryan Zuriff; Hagai Shaham
- Starring: Tobey Maguire; Elizabeth Banks; Dennis Haysbert; Ray Liotta; Kerry Washington; Laura Linney
- Cinematography: Sharone Meir
- Edited by: Madeleine Gavin
- Music by: tomandandy
- Production company: LD Entertainment
- Distributed by: RADiUS-TWC
- Release dates: January 2011 (Sundance Film Festival); November 2, 2012 (United States)
- Running time: 101 minutes
- Country: United States
- Language: English
- Box office: $63,595

The Details is a 2011 American independent black comedy film written and directed by Jacob Aaron Estes. It stars Tobey Maguire, Elizabeth Banks, Kerry Washington, Laura Linney, Ray Liotta and Maguire as the narrator. The film premiered at the 2011 Sundance Film Festival and went into limited release on November 2, 2012.

== Plot ==
Jeff Lang, an obstetric gynaecologist (OBGYN), and his wife Nealy live in Seattle with their two-year-old son, Miles. Considering a second child, they decide to enlarge their small home and lay expensive new grass in their backyard. Worms in the grass attract raccoons, who destroy the grass, and Jeff goes to great lengths to get rid of them, mixing poison with a can of tuna. Their neighbor, Lila, tells Jeff that her cat Matthew is missing, and Jeff does not yet realize he may be responsible.

After arguing with Nealy over his raccoon obsession, Jeff asks his childhood best friend, Becca, for advice. After drinks at a bar, they walk to the nearby house that Becca shares with her husband, Peter. Becca shows Jeff the collectible car that is her husband's pride and joy, and they have sex in the garage. Later, Lila, desperate to talk to Jeff, chases him to his office. Peter is waiting there, and confronts Jeff about his affair with Becca, which Lila possibly overhears. She leaves without talking to Jeff.

After work, Jeff visits Lila, who shows him proof that he accidentally poisoned Matthew. Distraught, she tells Jeff that she knows of his affair and blackmails him into having sex with her immediately. Jeff is unable to disengage before the act is completed but is confident the chances of Lila becoming pregnant are slim. He returns home, where Nealy tells him Peter stopped by. Meeting Peter at his restaurant, Jeff is offered the choice between calling Nealy to admit the affair or paying Peter $100,000.

Rendezvousing with Peter on a bridge, Jeff gives him the $75,000 he was able to get, having taken out a loan. Peter tosses the money into the river and chastises Jeff, warning that if he keeps making the same poor decisions, his life will be ruined. Jeff is inspired to reevaluate his life.

Jeff learns that his friend Lincoln, a basketball star in college until a car accident ruined his chances of turning pro, is dying of kidney failure. Determining that he is a perfect organ match, Jeff offers Lincoln a kidney. Recuperating from the surgery, a groggy Jeff is visited by Lila, who giddily reveals she is pregnant with his child. Dazed, Jeff does not immediately react, but later meets Lila in a coffee shop, telling her he will not be a father to the child. Lila says she just wants Jeff to be around for the baby's sake.

Jeff reveals all this to Lincoln, also telling him about a strange dream in which Lila was killed by an arrow. Lincoln, feeling beholden to Jeff for saving his life and landing him a dream job as a basketball coach, takes it upon himself to eliminate Lila. He buys an archery set and hunts her down in a park.

Nealy calls Jeff with news that police are interviewing everyone on their block about Lila's death. Lincoln's church honors Jeff with a special ceremony, during which he shares a silent exchange with Lincoln, knowing he killed Lila. On the way home, a guilt-stricken Jeff tells Nealy everything, but not before he intentionally kills a raccoon crossing the road. A hysterical Nealy laughingly tells Jeff of her own infidelity, and they decide to put everything behind them and start fresh.

Sometime later, their grass has been replaced with flowers, solving the raccoon problem, and Nealy is pregnant. Jeff laments that though things have turned out for the better, he will always worry about being found out.

== Cast ==
- Tobey Maguire as Jeff Lang
- Elizabeth Banks as Nealy Lang
- Kerry Washington as Rebecca Mazzoni
- Ray Liotta as Peter Mazzoni
- Laura Linney as Lila
- Dennis Haysbert as Lincoln

== Production ==
The film is loosely inspired by events in director Estes’ own life.

=== Release ===
The film was released on video-on-demand and iTunes in October, and was released in theaters in November.

The Details premiered on January 24, 2011 at the 2011 Sundance Film Festival after being sold to The Weinstein Company for $8 million.

== Reception ==
On the review aggregator website Rotten Tomatoes, the film holds an approval rating of 45% based on 33 reviews, with an average rating of 5.5/10. On Metacritic, the film has a weighted average score of 56 out of 100, based on 13 critic reviews, indicating "mixed or average reviews".

Reviewing the film for The New York Times, film critic Stephen Holden commented, "At certain moments, the male characters’ decisions bring to mind those turning points in Woody Allen's Crimes and Misdemeanors, when your breath catches in your throat, and your impulse is to cry, 'Oh no!'" Of Maguire's performance, Reuters said, "the 37-year-old actor is finally growing up on screen." Writing for the Los Angeles Times, Gary Goldstein describes the film as "strangely entertaining" and praises the ensemble cast.

Variety's Peter Debruge describes The Details as a darkly comedic exploration of domestic disintegration. He notes that the film offers scathing self-examination, creating an uneasy yet mature viewing experience. Writing for SFGATE, Mick LaSalle describes The Details as "not just entertaining, but potentially useful." He notes a hidden moral strictness and that the film's comedy might make its message get lost on those who need it most. He highlights the "exceptional" two-person scenes in the screenplay and praises the performance of Laura Linney, which he describes as "marvelous, abandoned and meticulous acting." LaSalle concludes by stating that the film is "committed and passionate" and "one of the most perceptive and morally persuasive movies of 2012."

Andrew Schenker of Slant Magazine described the film as "as smug and self-satisfied as its privileged lead character." Schenker argues that Estes displaces Jeff's guilt onto other characters, avoiding holding him accountable for his actions. He also highlights the disconnection strategy employed by the director, where Jeff's actions seem justified compared to the eccentricities of other characters. Schenker concludes that the guilt-ridden ending and cynical elements of the film add to its self-satisfied nature, resembling the ugliness of its "privileged hero."

IndieWire's Eric Kohn describes The Details as a film that follows the familiar mold of exploring the perils of suburban discontent. He comments on the symbolic overstatements throughout the movie and the filmmaker's intentions to critique the American dream and argues that the dark underbelly of the American dream has been explored extensively in previous films, making The Details seem like a remake rather than a fresh take. While acknowledging some interest in the performances and the soundtrack, Kohn states that the film struggles to find purpose and allow the comedic eccentricities to prevail. Ultimately, he grades the film with a D+ and suggests that its reception may be mixed due to its difficult timing and prior exploration of similar themes.
