= Jacob Aaron Estes =

American screenwriter and film director

- Born: September 6, 1972 (age 53); Tulare County, California, U.S.
- Occupations: Screenwriter, film director
- Known for: Mean Creek
- Spouse: Gretchen Lieberum

Jacob Aaron Estes (born September 6, 1972) is an American screenwriter and film director known for his films Mean Creek, The Details and Don't Let Go.

== Career ==
Estes was a theatre major at the University of California, Santa Cruz. After that, he went to film school at AFI. Estes also attended the National Playwrights Conference at the Eugene O'Neill Theater Center, which produced two of his plays, Free Lessons and Mean Creek. Estes turned Mean Creek into a screenplay, which became his feature film debut as writer and director in 2004. In his first offering as writer-director, he gained critical acclaim, receiving nominations at various film festivals and winning the Independent Spirit John Cassavetes Award.

His second film as writer/director came with the 2011 film The Details, which premiered at the 2011 Sundance Film Festival and stars Tobey Maguire, Laura Linney, Ray Liotta, Dennis Haysbert, Kerry Washington, and Elizabeth Banks. In 2019, Estes co-wrote and directed the Blumhouse thriller Don't Let Go starring David Oyelowo and Storm Reid.

== Personal life ==
Estes is married to musician Gretchen Lieberum.

== Filmography ==
Year	Film	Director	Writer	Producer	Notes
2001	Summoning	Yes	Yes	No	Short film
2004	Mean Creek	Yes	Yes	No	John Cassavetes Award winner
2005	Nearing Grace	No	Yes	No	
2011	The Details	Yes	Yes	No	
2014	7 Minutes	No	No	Yes	
2015	Bromance	No	No	No	Special thanks
2017	Rings	No	Yes	No	Co-wrote with David Loucka and Akiva Goldsman
2019	Don't Let Go	Yes	Yes	No	
2022	He's Watching	Yes	Yes	Yes	
