= Lizzy Caplan =

American actress (born 1982)

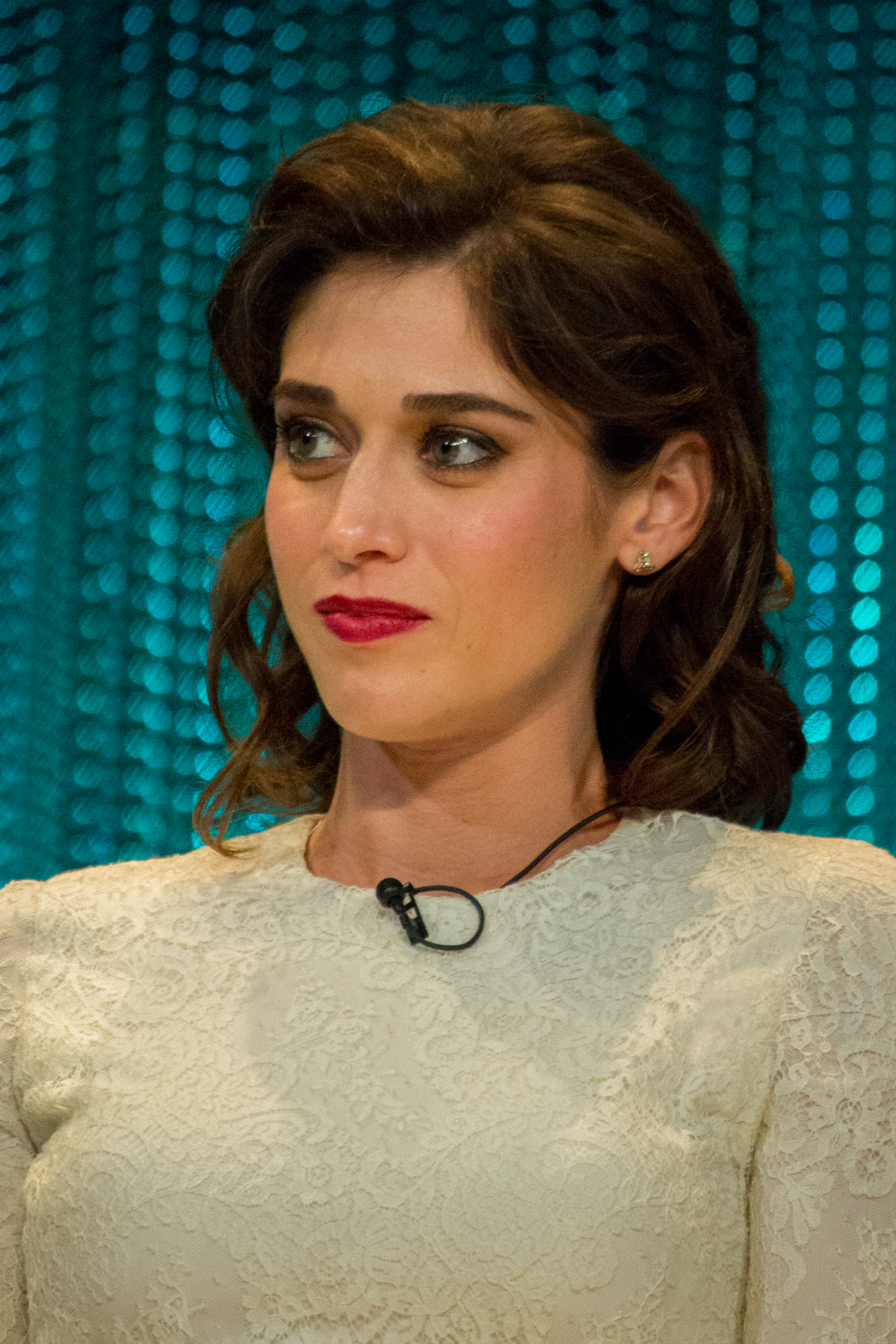
- Caplan at the 2014 PaleyFest
- Born: Elizabeth Anne Caplan; June 30, 1982 (age 44); Los Angeles, California, U.S.
- Occupation: Actress
- Years active: 1999–present
- Spouse: Tom Riley (m. 2017)
- Children: 1
- Relatives: Howard Bragman (uncle)

Elizabeth Anne Caplan (born June 30, 1982) is an American actress. Her performances as Virginia E. Johnson in the Showtime series Masters of Sex (2013–2016) and as Libby Epstein in FX on Hulu's Fleishman Is in Trouble (2022) have earned her nominations at the Primetime Emmy Awards.

Her first acting role was on the television series Freaks and Geeks (1999–2000). Since then, she had series-regular roles in several television series including Related (2005–2006), Party Down (2009–2010; 2023), Das Boot (2018), Castle Rock (2019), Truth Be Told (2019), Fatal Attraction (2023), and Zero Day (2025).

Caplan's film breakthrough came with her role as Janis Ian in Mean Girls (2004). Her other film appearances include My Best Friend's Girl (2008), Cloverfield (2008), Hot Tub Time Machine, 127 Hours (both 2010), Save the Date, Bachelorette (both 2012), The Interview (2014), Now You See Me 2, Allied (both 2016), Cobweb (2023) and Now You See Me: Now You Don't (2025).

== Early life ==
Elizabeth Anne Caplan was born on June 30, 1982, in Los Angeles, California, and grew up in its Miracle Mile district. Her family are Reform Jews of Ashkenazi Jewish descent. She had a Bat Mitzvah and attended Jewish summer camp. Her father, Richard Caplan, was a lawyer and her mother, Barbara (née Bragman), was a political aide. She is the youngest of three children with a brother, Benjamin, and a sister, Julie. Her mother died of cancer when she was 13 years old. Her uncle was publicist Howard Bragman.

Caplan attended Alexander Hamilton High School in Castle Heights, and attended the school's Academy of Music. She first focused on playing the piano, then later decided to pursue drama. She was also on her school's soccer team. She graduated in 2000, but did not attend college because she wanted to focus on acting.

== Career ==
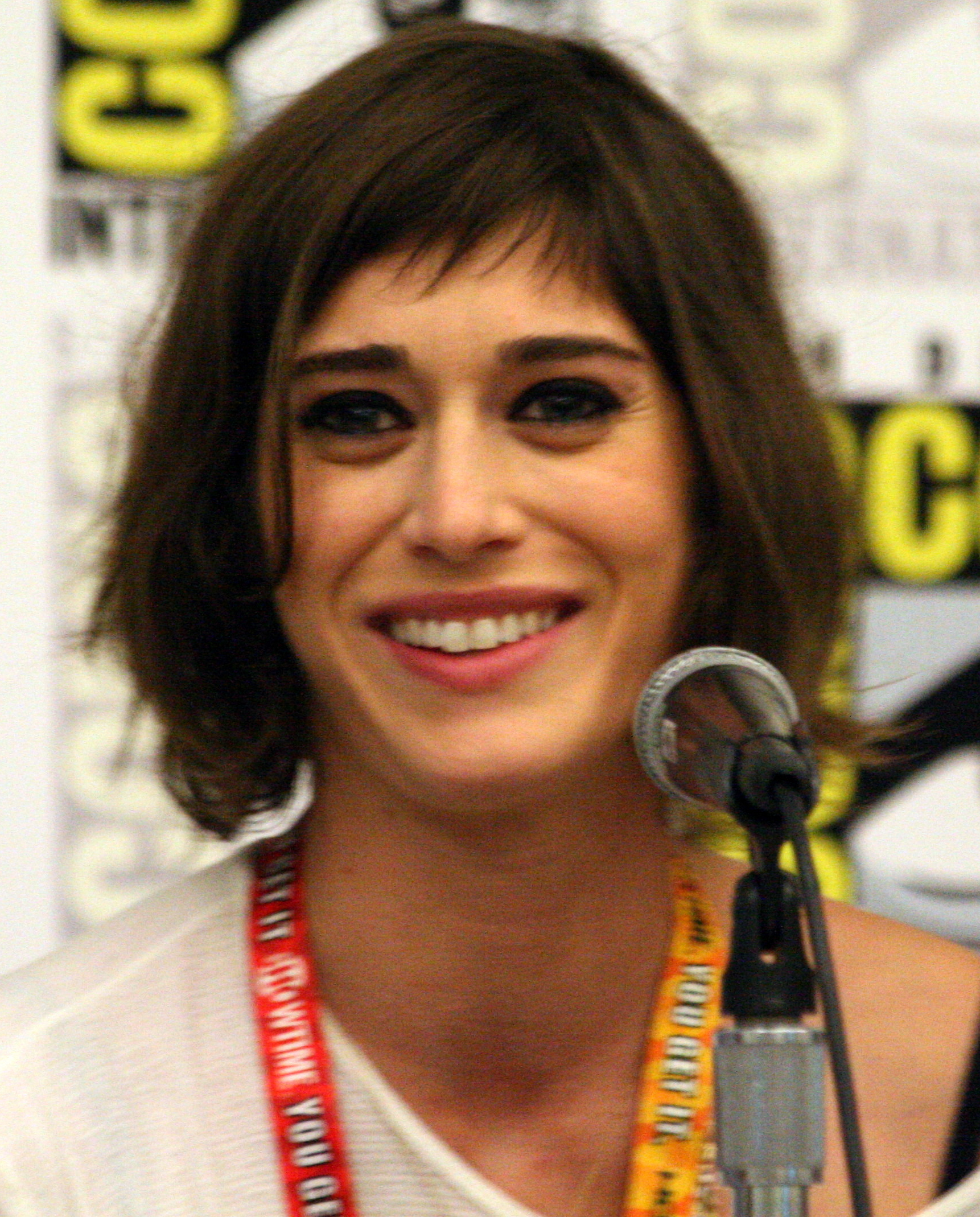
Caplan at the 2012 San Diego Comic-Con

Caplan began her acting career in 1999, first playing a girl named Sara in the critically acclaimed series Freaks and Geeks. Due to her performance, her character became the girlfriend of Jason Segel's character. She then had a series of guest appearances on numerous shows, and appeared in Jason Mraz's music video "You and I Both". In 2000 she appeared in her first film From Where I Sit which was released straight to television. In 2001, she played Tina Greer in an episode of Smallville, and reprised her role on the show in 2003. She appeared in two episodes of the ABC series Once and Again. In 2003, she starred in the television series The Pitts, playing Faith Pitt. She gained wider notice for playing Janis Ian in the 2004 film Mean Girls. She played Avery Bishop in the second season of Tru Calling.

In 2005, Caplan played troubled sister Marjee Sorelli in Related, a one-hour comedy-drama on The WB that was canceled after one season. In 2006, she starred as Sara Weller in the thriller film Love Is the Drug and was named one of "10 Actors to Watch" by Variety. After Related ended, Caplan was cast in the CBS sitcom The Class, which premiered in September 2006 and lasted for one season. She played Kat Warbler, one of several elementary school friends that reunite after 20 years.

In 2008, Caplan played Marlena Diamond in the film Cloverfield and was nominated for a Saturn Award for Best Supporting Actress. She also appeared as Ami in the romantic comedy My Best Friend's Girl. Later that year, she guest-starred as Amy Burley on the HBO vampire show True Blood. She was the voice of Faith Pitt in the proposed animated version of The Pitts, which was developed in 2007. She also appeared in the critically acclaimed Starz ensemble comedy Party Down, playing a struggling comedian who is part of a catering crew. In 2010, she appeared in 127 Hours.

In early 2012, Caplan premiered two films at the Sundance Film Festival: Save the Date and Bachelorette. Also in 2012, she appeared as Julia in several episodes of the Fox sitcom New Girl.

She played Agent Lacey in the 2014 film The Interview.

=== Masters of Sex (2013–2016) ===
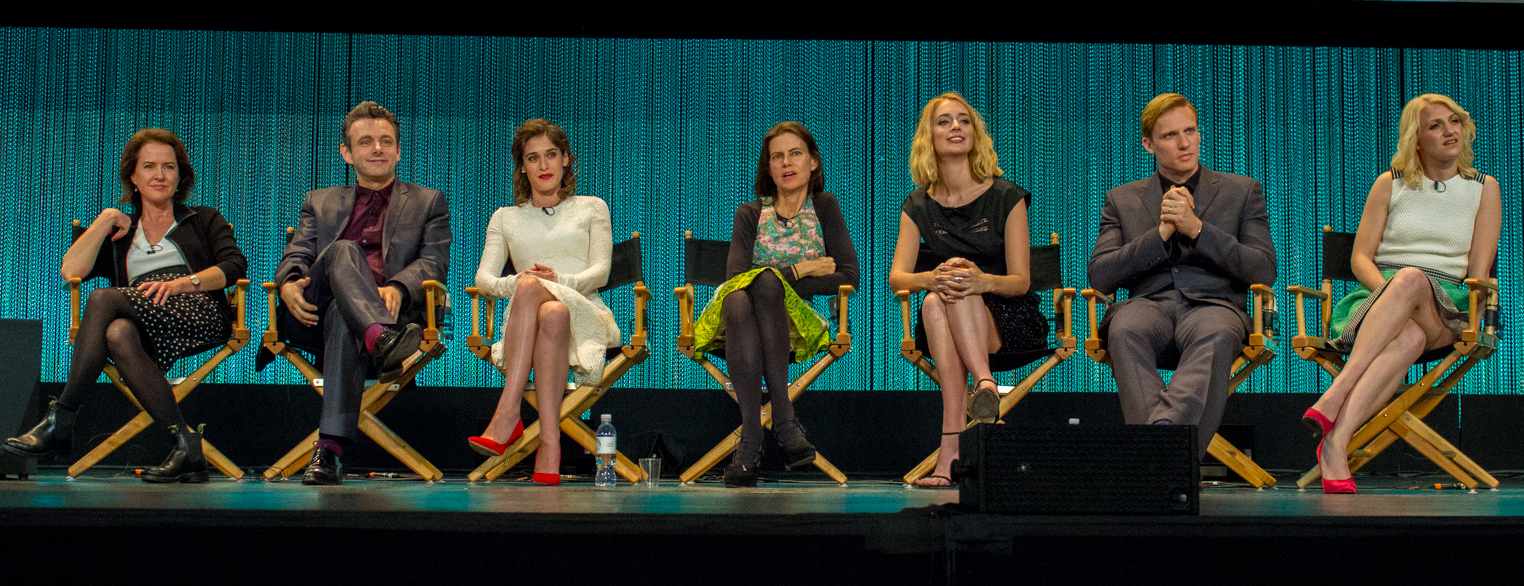
The cast of the TV show Masters of Sex in 2014

In 2013, she began playing 1960s human sexuality pioneer Virginia E. Johnson on the Showtime series Masters of Sex. Caplan also provided her own vocals for a cover version of the song "You Don't Know Me" in the Masters of Sex episode "Phallic Victories". Her performance on the show was well-reviewed, and on July 10, 2014, she was nominated for the Primetime Emmy Award for Outstanding Lead Actress in a Drama Series.

Caplan was cast in her role as Johnson before they signed her co-star Michael Sheen as William H. Masters because he was busy working on another production. Producer Sarah Timberman said of Caplan, "The minute we met Lizzie we thought that she just embodied so much of the spirit of Virginia Johnson." Caplan also stated herself that as a single woman pursuing her career above a family, she identified with many of Johnson's characteristics. Once she met the producers, it took several months before Caplan was officially signed, and she turned down several other roles in the meantime.

Virginia Johnson had worked alongside William Masters as they completed research of human sexual response and sexual dysfunction beginning in the late 1950s. To learn about the characters they were portraying, Caplan along with her other co-stars read Thomas Maier's 2009 biography Masters of Sex. The author also allowed Caplan to listen to some of his interview tapes with Johnson. Caplan also attempted to spend some time with Johnson before she died in 2013, but Johnson was ambivalent about the development of the show. It was the first time Caplan portrayed a real person and she mentioned in an interview that she felt a "deep responsibility" to Johnson, but that she had some wiggle room because most people have no idea what Johnson looked or sounded like. Maier stated that the developers of the show have remained mostly accurate to his book and have included other events that are historically relevant to St. Louis, where the series takes place and where Masters and Johnson lived. Caplan has discussed becoming comfortable with the large number of sex scenes in Masters of Sex.

Her portrayal earned her nominations for the Primetime Emmy Award, Satellite Award and Critics' Choice Television Award, all for Outstanding Lead Actress.

== Personal life ==
Caplan became engaged to British actor Tom Riley in New York in May 2016. They met in January 2015 while Caplan was filming Now You See Me 2 in London and made their red carpet debut as a couple at the Prague Opera Ball in February 2016. They married in September 2017 and had a son born in 2021.

== Filmography ==
=== Film ===
Year	Title	Role	Notes	Ref.
2002	Orange County	Party Girl		
2004	Mean Girls	Janis Ian		
2006	Love Is the Drug	Sara Weller		
2007	Crashing	Jacqueline		
2008	Cloverfield	Marlena Diamond		
2008	My Best Friend's Girl	Ami		
2009	Crossing Over	Marla		
2010	Hot Tub Time Machine	April Drennan		
2010	The Last Rites of Ransom Pride	Juliette Flowers		
2010	127 Hours	Sonja Ralston		
2011	High Road	Sheila		
2012	Save the Date	Sarah		
2012	Bachelorette	Gena Myers		
2012	3, 2, 1... Frankie Go Boom	Lassie		
2012	Queens of Country	Jolene Gillis		
2012	Item 47	Claire Wise	Short film	
2014	The Interview	Agent Lacey		
2015	The Night Before	Diana		
2016	Now You See Me 2	Lula May		
2016	Allied	Bridget Vatan		
2017	The Disaster Artist	Herself	Cameo	
2018	Extinction	Alice		
2022	The People We Hate at the Wedding	Marissa		
2023	Cobweb	Carol		
2025	Now You See Me: Now You Don't	Lula May		
2026	Drag	TBA	Post-production	

=== Television ===
Year	Title	Role	Notes
1999–2000	Freaks and Geeks	Sara	4 episodes
2000	From Where I Sit	Lily	Television film
2001	Undeclared	Beautiful girl	Episode: "Prototype"
2001	Once and Again	Sarah	Episode: "Tough Love"
2001–2003	Smallville	Tina Greer	2 episodes
2002	Everybody's Doing It	Angela	Television film
2003	The Pitts	Faith Pitt	Main role
2005	Tru Calling	Avery Bishop	4 episodes
2005–2006	Related	Marjee Sorelli	Main role
2006	Family Guy	Woman arguing with Quagmire (voice)	Episode: "Chick Cancer"
2006–2007	The Class	Kat Warbler	Main role
2006–2009; 2026	American Dad!	Debbie (voice)	5 episodes
2008	True Blood	Amy Burley	Main role (season 1)
2008	The Life & Times of Tim	(voice)	Episode: "Insurmountable High Score/Tim vs. the Baby"
2009–2010; 2023	Party Down	Casey Klein	Main role (seasons 1–2); guest star (season 3)
2010–2011	Childrens Hospital	Harmony / Casey Klein	2 episodes
2011	The Cleveland Show	Patty Donner (voice)	Episode: "The Essence of Cleveland"
2011	Mr. Sunshine	Vivian Cornelli	Episode: "Ben and Vivian"
2011	Wainy Days	Arielle	Episode: "Kelly and Arielle – Part 2"
2012	New Girl	Julia Cleary	4 episodes
2013	Newsreaders	Anya Turpo	Episode: "Hedge Fun"
2013–2014	The League	Rebecca Ruxin	3 episodes
2013–2016	Masters of Sex	Virginia E. Johnson	Main role; also producer
2014	Kroll Show	Signing Bonus contestant #1	Episode: "Krolling Around with Nick Klown"
2014	Comedy Bang! Bang!	Herself	Episode: "Lizzy Caplan Wears All Black & Powder Blue Espadrilles"
2017	The Simpsons	Virginia Johnson (voice)	Episode: "Kamp Krustier"
2017	Angie Tribeca	Deirdre	Episode: "If You See Something, Solve Something"
2017	Ill Behaviour	Nadia	3 episodes
2017	I'm Sorry	Jessica	Episode: "Too Slow"
2018	Das Boot	Carla Monroe	Main role (season 1)
2019	Castle Rock	Annie Wilkes	Main role (season 2)
2019–2020	Truth Be Told	Josie and Lanie Burhman	Main role
2021–2022	Inside Job	Reagan Ridley (voice)	Main role
2022	Fleishman Is In Trouble	Libby	Miniseries
2023	Fatal Attraction	Alex Forrest	Main role
2025	Zero Day	Alexandra Mullen	Main role
2026	How Not to Draw	Luz Noceda's animator	Web series; episode: "Luz"
TBA	Far Cry	TBA	Main role
TBA	Darkwing Duck	Gosalyn Mallard	Main role

=== Audio ===
Year	Title	Role	Notes
2025	The Commuter	Amy Nichols	Main role

== Awards and nominations ==
Year	Award	Category	Nominated work	Result	Ref.
2007	Saturn Awards	Best Supporting Actress	Cloverfield	Nominated	
2010	Teen Choice Awards	Choice Movie Actress – Comedy	Hot Tub Time Machine	Nominated	
2014	Critics' Choice Television Awards	Best Actress in a Drama Series	Masters of Sex	Nominated	
2014	Primetime Emmy Awards	Outstanding Lead Actress in a Drama Series	Masters of Sex	Nominated	
2014	Satellite Awards	Best Actress – Television Series Drama	Masters of Sex	Nominated	
2015	Satellite Awards	Best Actress – Television Series Drama	Masters of Sex	Nominated	
2016	Teen Choice Awards	Choice Summer Movie Star: Female	Now You See Me 2	Nominated	
2023	Primetime Emmy Awards	Outstanding Lead Actress in a Limited or Anthology Series or Movie	Fleishman Is in Trouble	Nominated	
