= Alex Kurtzman =

American filmmaker (born 1973)

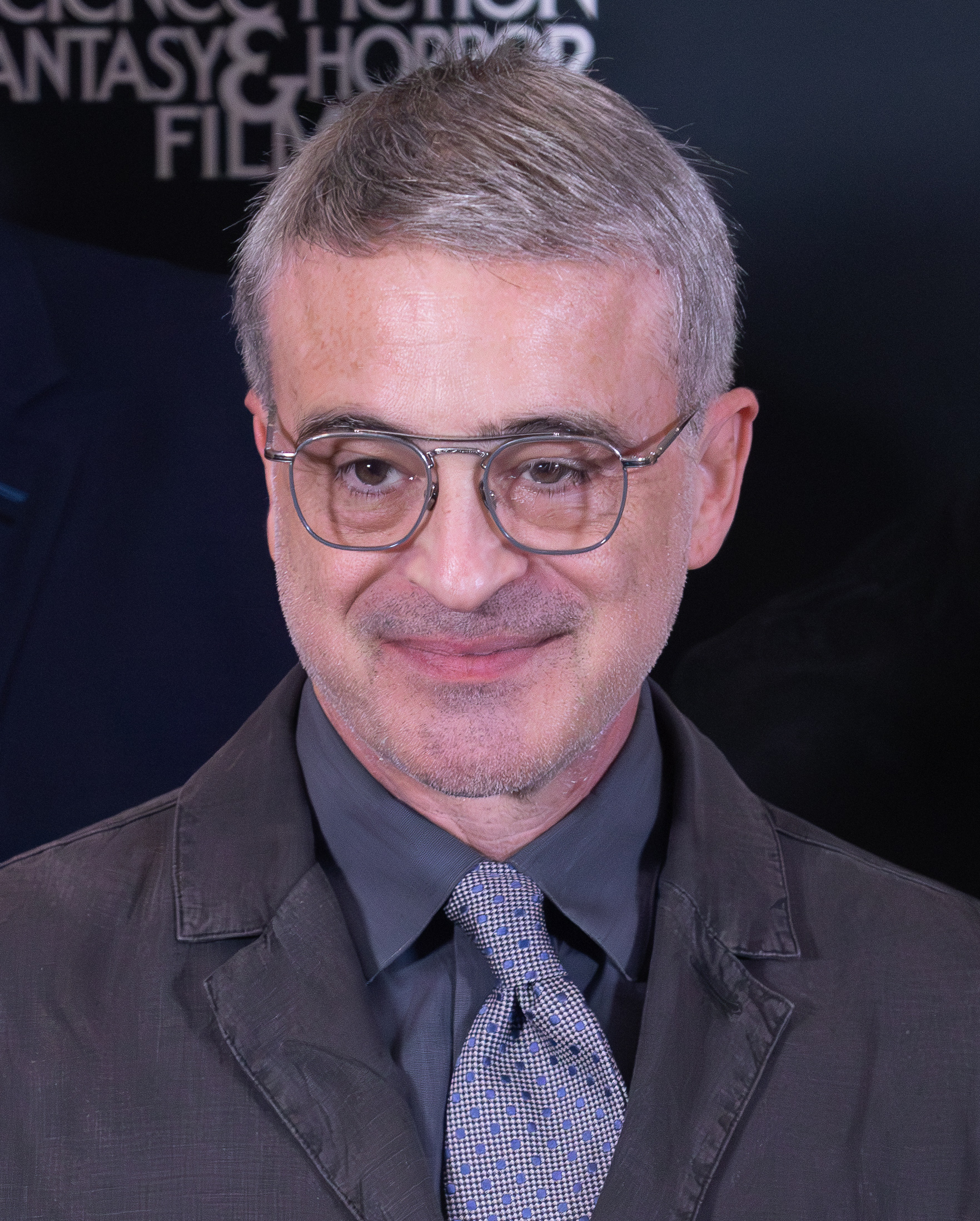
- Kurtzman in 2026
- Born: Alexander Hilary Kurtzman; September 7, 1973 (age 53); Los Angeles, California, U.S.
- Occupations: Screenwriter; producer; director
- Years active: 1996–present
- Known for: Co-founder of K/O Paper Products, founder of Secret Hideout
- Spouse: Samantha Counter (m. 2002)

Alexander Hilary Kurtzman (born September 7, 1973) is an American filmmaker. He is best known for co-writing the scripts to Transformers (2007), Transformers: Revenge of the Fallen (2009), Star Trek (2009), Star Trek Into Darkness (2013), and The Amazing Spider-Man 2 (2014) with his writing and producing partner Roberto Orci, and directing and co-writing The Mummy (2017). He made his directorial debut with People Like Us (2012), co-written alongside Orci and Jody Lambert.

Kurtzman is known, alongside Orci, for frequently collaborating with Michael Bay and J.J. Abrams, as well as co-creating for numerous Paramount+ series: Star Trek: Discovery (2017–2024), Star Trek: Picard (2020–2023), and Star Trek: Strange New Worlds (2022–present); he also serves as showrunner of Star Trek: Starfleet Academy (2026–present).

== Early life and education ==
Kurtzman was born into a Jewish family and raised in Los Angeles, California. His longtime screenwriting partner Roberto Orci was his best friend in high school.

Kurtzman attended Wesleyan University.

== Career ==
Kurtzman first teamed with Orci on the syndicated series Hercules: The Legendary Journeys, for the television unit of Pacific Renaissance Pictures, then operating out of Universal International. After they produced several storylines to cope with the absence of lead actor Kevin Sorbo following a stroke that Sorbo had suffered during the fourth season, Kurtzman and Orci, both aged 24, were placed in charge of the show. They moved into films after they were asked to rewrite Michael Bay's The Island. The film earned nearly $163 million at the worldwide box office, on a budget of $126 million, which was enough of a success that they were brought in to write Bay's Transformers, which earned $710 million. Though The Island and Transformers: Revenge of the Fallen were not particularly well received by critics, the two films earned a combined $1.7 billion. They co-created the Fox TV series Fringe in 2008 along with J. J. Abrams. After the pilot, Kurtzman served as consulting producer on the show for the remainder of its run. They then co-wrote the 2009 film Star Trek.

In 2011, Forbes magazine described Orci and Kurtzman as "Hollywood's Secret Weapons".

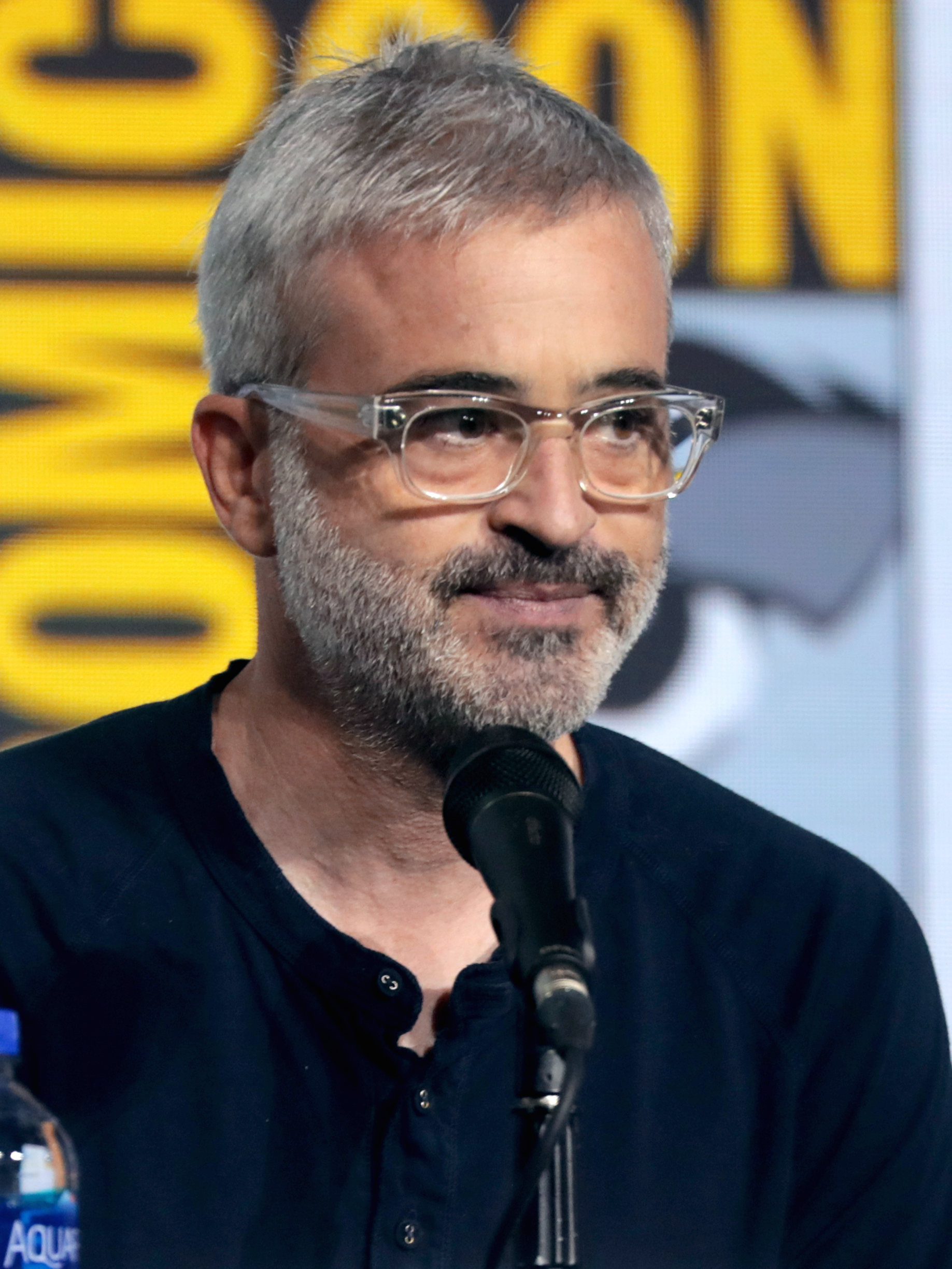
Kurtzman at the 2019 San Diego Comic-Con

Kurtzman has frequently worked with a tight-knit group of film professionals which include J. J. Abrams, Damon Lindelof, Adam Horowitz, Roberto Orci, Edward Kitsis, Andre Nemec, Josh Appelbaum, Jeff Pinkner, and Bryan Burk. In April 2014, both Orci and Kurtzman confirmed to Variety that they would no longer work together on film projects; they added that they would still work together—but only on television projects.

In 2018, Kurtzman signed a new five-year deal with CBS Television Studios to oversee and expand the Star Trek franchise on television, including serving as executive producer on Star Trek: Discovery (which he also co-showran with Michelle Paradise), Star Trek: Short Treks, Star Trek: Picard, Star Trek: Lower Decks, and Starfleet Academy (which he co-showruns with Noga Landau).

In August 2021, Kurtzman and his production company Secret Hideout extended their overall deal with CBS Studios through 2026.

== Personal life ==
In 2002, Kurtzman married Samantha Counter, the daughter of lawyer Nick Counter.

== Filmography ==
=== Film ===
Year	Title	Director	Writer	Producer	Notes
2005	The Island	No	Yes	No	
2005	The Legend of Zorro	No	Yes	No	
2006	Mission: Impossible III	No	Yes	No	
2007	Transformers	No	Yes	No	
2008	Eagle Eye	No	No	Yes	
2009	Watchmen	No	Uncredited	No	Script polish
2009	Star Trek	No	Yes	Executive	
2009	The Proposal	No	No	Executive	
2009	Transformers: Revenge of the Fallen	No	Yes	No	
2011	Cowboys & Aliens	No	Yes	Yes	
2012	People Like Us	Yes	Yes	Executive	Directorial debut
2013	Star Trek Into Darkness	No	Yes	Yes	
2013	Now You See Me	No	No	Yes	
2013	Ender's Game	No	No	Yes	
2014	The Amazing Spider-Man 2	No	Yes	Executive	
2016	Now You See Me 2	No	No	Yes	
2017	The Mummy	Yes	Story	Yes	
2024	Rob Peace	No	No	Yes	
2025	Star Trek: Section 31	No	No	Executive	
2025	Now You See Me: Now You Don't	No	No	Yes	

=== Television ===
Year	Title	Director	Writer	Executive Producer	Creator	Notes
1997–1999	Hercules: The Legendary Journeys	No	Yes	Yes	No	
1999–2000	Xena: Warrior Princess	No	Yes	Yes	No	
2000	Jack of All Trades	No	Yes	Yes	No	
2001–2003	Alias	Yes	Yes	Yes	No	Also supervising producer
2004	The Secret Service	Yes	Yes	Yes	No	Pilot
2008–2013	Fringe	Yes	Yes	Yes	Yes	Also consulting producer
2010	Transformers: Prime	No	No	Yes	Yes	Also developer
2010–2020	Hawaii Five-0	Yes	Yes	Yes	No	Also developer
2011	Exit Strategy	Yes	Yes	Yes	Yes	Pilot
2011	Locke & Key	Yes	Yes	Yes	Yes	Pilot
2013–2017	Sleepy Hollow	Yes	Yes	Yes	Yes	
2014	Matador	No	No	Yes	No	
2014–2018	Scorpion	No	No	Yes	No	
2015–2016	Limitless	No	Yes	Yes	No	
2017–2024	Star Trek: Discovery	Yes	Yes	Yes	Yes	Episode "Brother"
2017–2018	Salvation	No	No	Yes	No	
2018–2020	Star Trek: Short Treks	No	Yes	Yes	Yes	
2018–2019	Instinct	No	No	Yes	No	
2020–2023	Star Trek: Picard	No	Yes	Yes	Yes	
2020–2024	Star Trek: Lower Decks	No	No	Yes	No	
2021	Clarice	No	Yes	Yes	Yes	
2021–2024	Star Trek: Prodigy	No	No	Yes	No	
2022	The Man Who Fell to Earth	Yes	Yes	Yes	Yes	
2022–present	Star Trek: Strange New Worlds	No	Yes	Yes	Yes	
2026–present	Star Trek: Starfleet Academy	Yes	Yes	Yes	No	
