= Bobby Cohen =

American film producer

Bobby Cohen is an American film producer whose credits include The Cider House Rules and Memoirs of a Geisha.

== Life and career ==
Bobby Cohen was born on February 8, 1970, in New York state. Cohen's parents are both attorneys. After graduating from Cold Spring Harbor High School in 1988, Cohen attended and received a degree from New York University.

Cohen worked as an assistant at the Writers & Artists Agency. At the age of 23, Cohen joined Miramax Films where he worked his way up to Senior VP of Production. During that time, he contributed to movies like Clerks, Scream and Beautiful Girls. His first producing credit was for 54, which was mildly received. Cohen produced several other movies for Miramax before leaving in 2003.

After Miramax, Cohen started his own production company, Cohen Productions. Cohen's company produced the Gwyneth Paltrow movie, View from the Top. Following that, Cohen became president of Red Wagon Productions, where he was executive producer on such projects as Jarhead and Memoirs of a Geisha. After leaving Red Wagon, Cohen went on to produce such films as Definitely, Maybe for Working Title/Universal Pictures and Revolutionary Road for DreamWorks.

== Filmography ==
Executive producer

- 54 (1998)
- Rounders (1998)
- The Cider House Rules (1999)
- Down to You (2000)
- Bewitched (2005)
- Jarhead (2005)
- Memoirs of a Geisha (2005)
- RV (2006)
- Definitely, Maybe (2008)
- Cowboys & Aliens (2011)
- The Chancellor Manuscript (TBA)
- Tokyo Suckerpunch (TBA)

Producer

- Bounce (2000) (Co-producer)
- View from the Top (2003)
- Happy Endings (2005) (Co-producer)
- Revolutionary Road (2008)
- People Like Us (2012)
- Now You See Me (2013)
- Now You See Me 2 (2016)
- Don't Let Go (2019)
- Now You See Me: Now You Don't (2025)

Production manager

- Since You've Been Gone (1998) (TV movie)
