= Roberto Orci =

American screenwriter and producer (1973–2025)

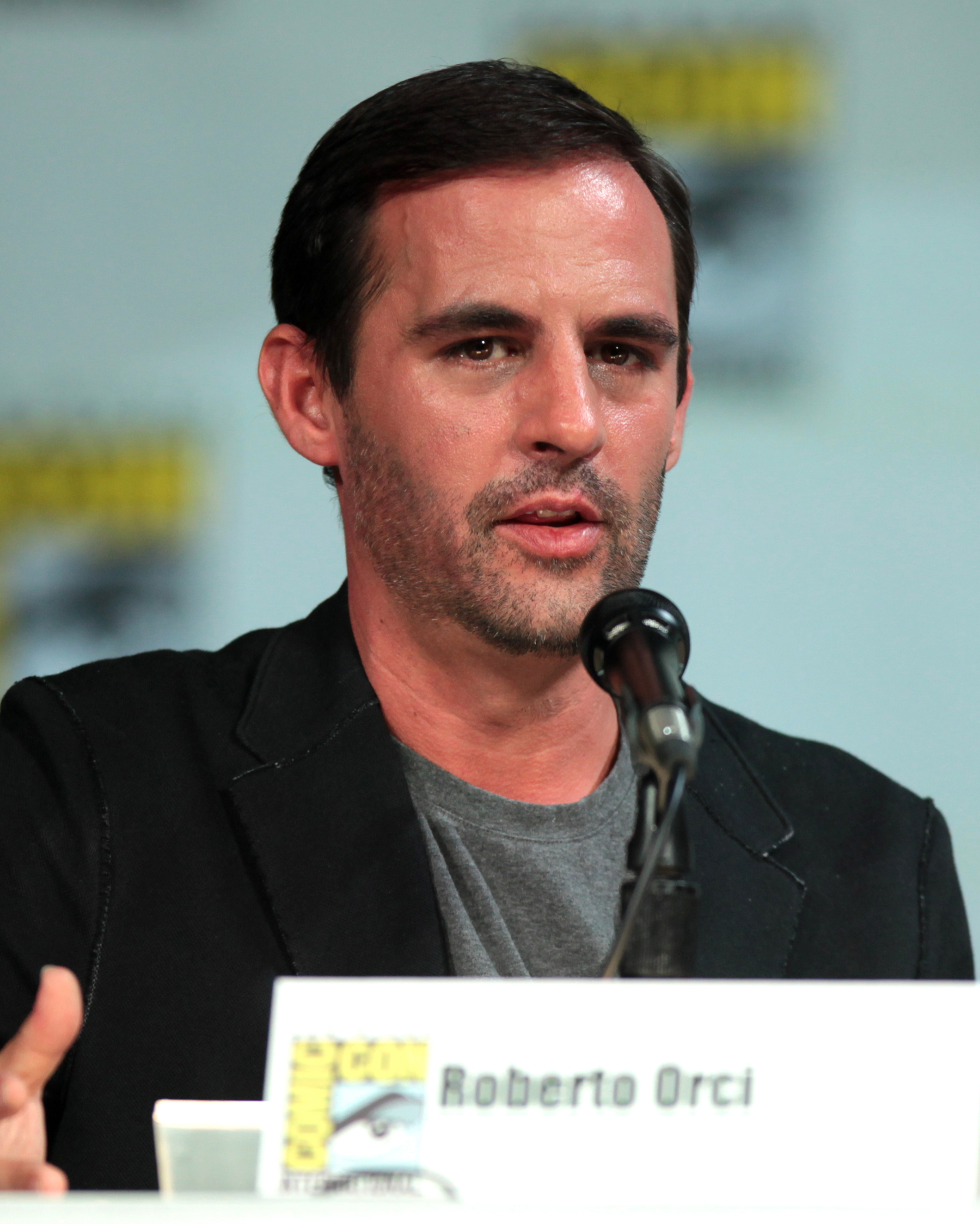
- Orci at the 2014 San Diego Comic-Con
- Born: Roberto Gaston Orcí; July 20, 1973; Mexico City, Mexico
- Died: February 25, 2025 (aged 51); Los Angeles, California, U.S.
- Other name: Bob Orci
- Education: University of Texas at Austin
- Occupations: Screenwriter; producer
- Years active: 1996–2025
- Spouses: Melissa Blake (div. 2020); Adele Heather Taylor (m. 2020; sep. 2022)
- Relatives: J. R. Orci (brother); Courtney Ford (stepsister)

Roberto Gaston Orcí (July 20, 1973 – February 25, 2025) was a Mexican-American film and television screenwriter and producer. He is best known for co-writing the scripts to Transformers (2007), Transformers: Revenge of the Fallen (2009), Star Trek (2009), Star Trek Into Darkness (2013), and The Amazing Spider-Man 2 (2014) with his writing and producing partner Alex Kurtzman.

Born in Mexico City, Orci began his longtime collaboration with Alex Kurtzman while at school in California. Together they were employed on television series such as Hercules: The Legendary Journeys and Xena: Warrior Princess. In 2008, together with J. J. Abrams, they created Fringe. In 2013, they created Sleepy Hollow alongside Phillip Iscove. Orci and Kurtzman's first film project was Michael Bay's The Island, and due to that partnership they went on to write the scripts for the first two films of the Transformers film series. Orci first became a film producer with 2008's Eagle Eye and again with 2009's The Proposal.

Orci and Kurtzman subsequently returned to working with Abrams on Mission: Impossible III and both Star Trek and Star Trek Into Darkness. Between 2005 and 2011, Kurtzman and Orci's film projects took revenues of more than $3 billion. In April 2014, Orci and Kurtzman announced that they would only collaborate on television projects, and Orci worked on the third Star Trek film, Star Trek Beyond, until being replaced the following December. Orci created the television series Matador for the El Rey Network, but after this was initially renewed, it was cancelled at the end of the first season. Orci and Kurtzman worked as producers on the television series Limitless and Scorpion. Orci was awarded the Norman Lear Writer's Award and the Raul Julia Award for Excellence, in addition to shared awards and nominations including The George Pal Memorial Award.

== Early life ==
Roberto Gaston Orcí was born in Mexico City on July 20, 1973, to a Mexican father and a Cuban mother. Orci grew up in Mexico, and moved with his family to the United States at the age of 10.

He met his longtime friend and collaborator Alex Kurtzman when both were 17-year-old students at Crossroads, a private school in Santa Monica, California. The first time they came across each other was in a film class, where they discovered each other's love for films and in particular the Steven Soderbergh film Sex, Lies, and Videotape. The duo found that they had a number of things in common, as Kurtzman had previously lived in Mexico City and the two could relate. Orci later called him an "honorary Hispanic". Orci went on to attend the University of Texas at Austin. The duo got together once again, and began to write scripts. These included one called Misfortune Cookies which Orci described as "loosely autobiographical", and Last Kiss, which Kurtzman said was their version of The Breakfast Club but was set in a lunatic asylum.

== Career ==
=== Television and film screenwriting ===
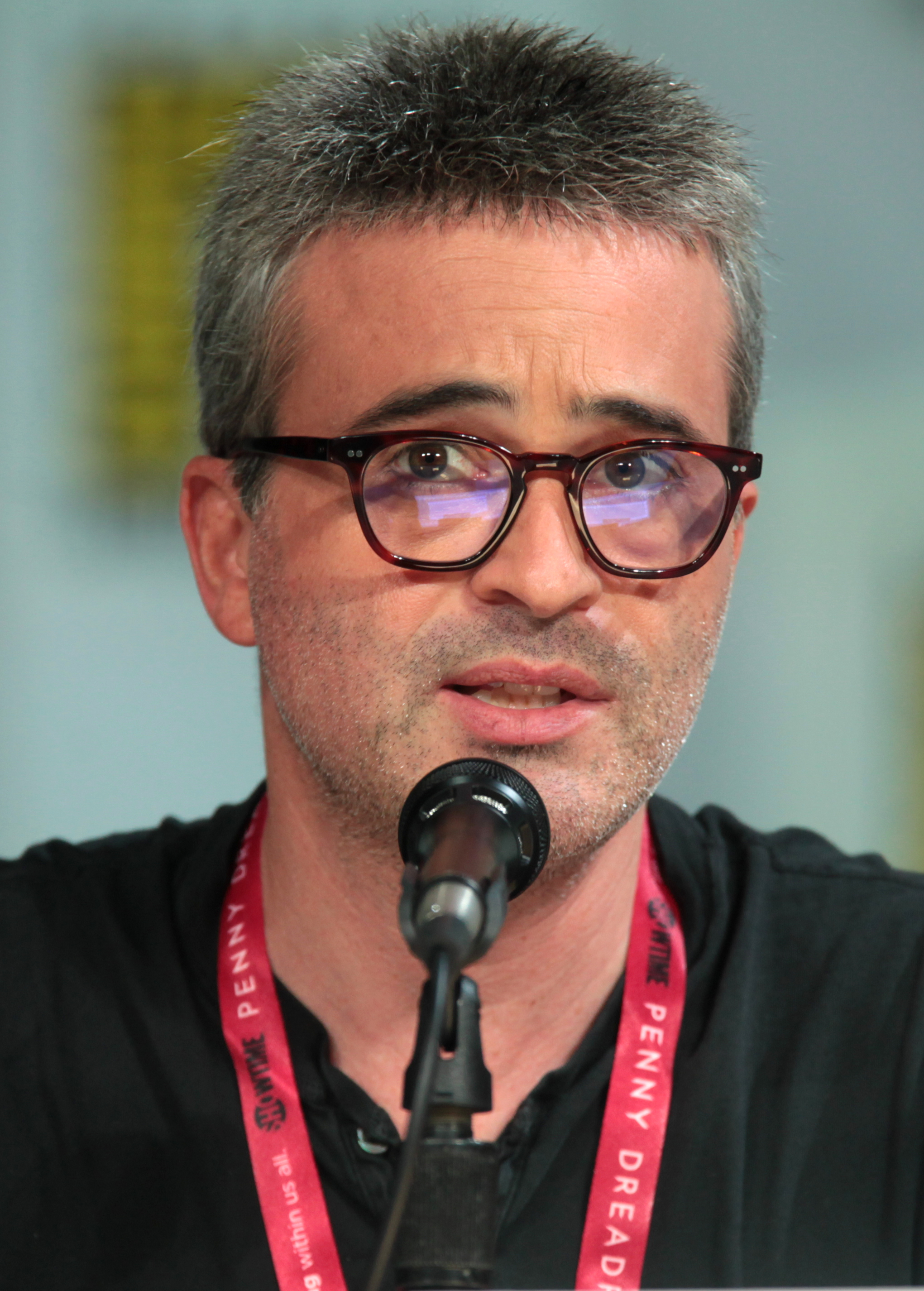
Orci's longtime writing partner Alex Kurtzman

Orci and Kurtzman began their writing collaboration on the television series Hercules: The Legendary Journeys, after being hired by Sam Raimi. After actor Kevin Sorbo suffered a stroke, the duo were required to come up with inventive ideas to minimize his appearances on screen. Due to this work, they became show runners at the age of 24. They were also involved in the sister-series to Hercules, Xena: Warrior Princess. They sought to move to writing for a network-based television series, but found this difficult. After receiving a series of negative responses, they met with J. J. Abrams who was starting work on Alias at the time. The meeting went well, and resulted in them working on the series. They would go on to work together again on the Fox science fiction series Fringe where all three were listed as co-creators.

Orci and Kurtzman received their break in writing for films in 2004, with the Michael Bay film The Island, for which they developed the spec script by Caspian Tredwell-Owen. When Kurtzman and Orci first met Bay, he asked the pair "Why should I trust you?", to which Orci replied "You shouldn't yet. Let's see what happens." While the film was not an overwhelming success, they were brought back for Bay's following film, Transformers, after producer Steven Spielberg asked them to come in for a meeting. The movie took in $710 million at the box office.

Following their work on that film, the duo were brought in to revise the script for Zack Snyder's Watchmen, in an uncredited capacity. They worked once more with Abrams, on Mission: Impossible III. When they collaborated once more with Bay for Transformers: Revenge of the Fallen, they were under significant time pressures due to the 2007–08 Writers Guild of America strike. Kurtzman and Orci had two weeks to outline the film, and after the strike Bay had them moved into the Hotel Casa del Mar. The hotel was six blocks away from his office, enabling Bay to conduct surprise inspections.

In the period between 2005 and 2011, the films written by Kurtzman and Orci grossed more than $3 billion, leading to Forbes describing them as "Hollywood's secret weapons". The busyness of their screenwriting careers required them to collaborate with other writers due to the number of projects they were involved in. For example, on Transformers: Revenge of the Fallen, they teamed up with Ehren Kruger, who took over from them on the writing duties for the Transfomers franchise from Transformers: Dark of the Moon onwards.

=== Becoming a producer ===
Orci's first credit solely as a producer came with the film Eagle Eye, where he worked once again alongside Kurtzman. He said in an interview with the magazine Extra that he had previously been involved in productions where the producers had writing backgrounds and had looked to them for help, and he was happy to provide that same support to the writers on Eagle Eye. The director of the film, D. J. Caruso, praised the duo saying that "What's unusually cool about them is that they have maintained the producer-writer power that they earned in television and carried that over into the feature film area, and that is extremely rare." Following their work on Eagle Eye, they were executive producers on the Sandra Bullock film, The Proposal.

Despite their film careers, Orci and Kurtzman continued to create television series. These included Sleepy Hollow, which they developed alongside Phillip Iscove. They pitched the series to a number of networks, and it was picked up by Fox. Orci took five years to bring the series Matador to television, with it originating from a conversation with his cousin Andrew. It was created for Robert Rodriguez's El Rey Network, and Rodriguez's one demand of the show was that he could direct the pilot episode. Orci later explained in an interview that it was an easy decision, and he needed to pretend to consider it.

Orci and Kurtzman also worked together as executive producers on the animated television series, Transformers: Prime, due to their involvement with the live action movies. Following the end of the series they were hopeful to be involved in a future animated series based on the premise, which Orci saw less like a reboot of the show and more of a continuation in a different guise. He felt that while Prime was sophisticated, there were concerns that it was leaving younger viewers behind because of its complexity and intensity. He became producer of the reboot of Hawaii Five-0 with Kurtzman in 2010.

=== Star Trek reboot ===
Orci and Kurtzman were asked to write the script for a new Star Trek film, but initially turned it down despite Orci being a fan of the series. Orci suggested rebooting the timeline as seen previously in the films and television series, and adding the return of Leonard Nimoy as Spock from Star Trek: The Original Series. He considered the first two films in the reboot series to be the origin story for the crew, and that the third film would start where the crew was at the beginning of Star Trek: The Original Series. Orci felt that the relationship between the James T. Kirk and the younger Spock was reflective of the partnership of himself and Kurtzman, he said that "We didn't even realize we were writing about ourselves until we were halfway through the script-that was a little embarrassing.” Star Trek was profitable at the domestic box-office, resulting in a sequel being greenlit by the studio and Kurtzman and Orci being asked to write it. The studio set aside a larger budget for the sequel, which was revealed by Orci in an interview with TrekMovie.com. Orci ruled out the "hero quitting" staple of a second movie, which had featured in the Transformers sequel, saying that the crew of the Enterprise were committed and that type of story does not have to apply to all sequels. During the buildup to the film, called Star Trek Into Darkness, Orci was one of the production team who did not give much away about the villain in the film and denied that Benedict Cumberbatch was to play Khan Noonian Singh.

=== Breakup of the partnership ===
In April 2014, Orci and Kurtzman confirmed to Variety that they were no longer going to work together on film projects but will still collaborate on television. Kurtzman wanted to work on the Spider-Man film franchise, while Orci was linked to the directorial role for Star Trek 3. Orci confirmed later that year in July that he was not involved in the production of The Amazing Spider-Man 3 alongside Kurtzman. Orci and Kurtzman's K/O Paper Products continues to operate as a production company within CBS Television Studios, and has created the series Scorpion inspired by the life of Walter O'Brien for the 2014–15 season and Limitless was created for the 2015–16 season from the 2011 film.

Prior to the split of Kurtzman and Orci, the duo were lined up to write the third film in the new Star Trek series. In May 2014, Skydance and Paramount Pictures announced that Orci was to direct the third installment of the Star Trek reboot franchise, after Abrams moved on to direct Star Wars: The Force Awakens. This would have marked Orci's directorial debut, and he was to write the script alongside co-writers JD Payne and Patrick McKay. Due to his commitment to Star Trek 3, he dropped out of a new Power Rangers film, for which he would have been executive producer. But on December 5, it was announced he would no longer be directing the Star Trek film. He remains credited as a producer on the film, and was replaced by Doug Jung and cast member Simon Pegg as the script writers after Orci's initial script was dropped. Orci was replaced as director by Justin Lin, who had previously directed films in The Fast and the Furious franchise.

Orci created Matador with the idea that the main character would be a "soccer player by day who is a spy by night", and called him a "Latin James Bond". The series was broadcast on the El Rey Network created by Robert Rodriguez. It was renewed for a second season shortly before the pilot was broadcast, which had been directed by Rodriguez. But following the production of the first season, the series was cancelled despite the earlier renewal. This decision was blamed on poor international sales.

In March 2020, it was reported that Roberto Orci was hired by Sony to write a script for an untitled Marvel film that would be set in Sony's Spider-Man Universe.

== Personal life and death ==
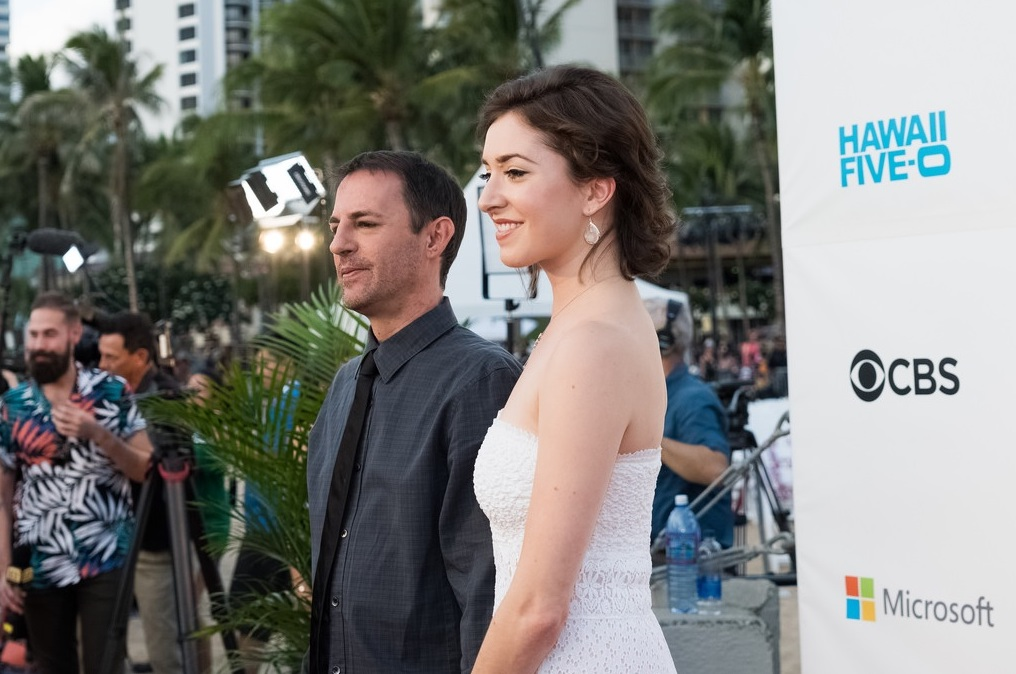
Roberto Orci and Adele Heather Taylor attend a CBS Sunset on the Beach event to celebrate Hawaii Five-0, in Honolulu, Hawaii.

Orci's first wife was actress Melissa Blake. Blake filed for divorce in July 2016, and the divorce was settled in March 2020. Orci married actress and screenwriter Adele Heather Taylor on June 6, 2020, in a private ceremony. They worked together as screenwriters and producers. Orci filed for divorce in January 2023.

In August 2024, Taylor filed a lawsuit accusing Orci of physical and sexual abuse. Orci, however, stated that Taylor was physically and financially abusive to him, having tased him, attacked him with a baseball bat, and attempted to strangle him, all in incidents reported to the police.

Orci died from kidney disease at his Los Angeles home, on February 25, 2025, at the age of 51.

== Awards and accolades ==
The Hollywood Reporter listed Orci as one of the 50 most powerful Latinos in Hollywood of 2007. His first solo accolade was the Norman Lear Writer's Award at the Imagen Awards in 2009. He described the experience of receiving an award without Kurtzman as "bizarre". Orci was also awarded the Raul Julia Award for Excellence by the National Hispanic Foundation for the Arts. Together with Kurtzman, Orci won The George Pal Memorial Award at the 2010 Saturn Awards.

Orci and Kurtzman were both honored by the nonprofit organization Chrysalis at the Butterfly Ball on June 8, 2013. The organization raises money for homeless people and low-income families, Orci said that "When you hear the life stories from people right here in our own community, who are clients at Chrysalis, and when you come to learn of their lowest moments and how Chrysalis has led to their proudest triumphs, it's easy to see why this local organization is so impactful."

In 2017, Orci was the recipient of the Visionary Impact Award by the National Hispanic Media Coalition. This award is given out by the organization for "Latinos making outstanding contributions to the positive portrayals of Latinos in film and TV".

== Filmography ==
=== Film ===
Year	Title	Credited as		Notes
Year	Title	Screenwriter	Producer	Notes
2005	The Island	Yes	No	Co-wrote with Alex Kurtzman and Caspian Tredwell-Owen
2005	The Legend of Zorro	Yes	No	Co-wrote with Alex Kurtzman, Ted Elliott and Terry Rossio
2006	Mission: Impossible III	Yes	No	Co-wrote with J. J. Abrams and Alex Kurtzman
2007	Transformers	Yes	No	Co-wrote with Alex Kurtzman and John Rogers
2008	Eagle Eye	No	Yes	
2009	Watchmen	Yes	No	Uncredited script polish
2009	Star Trek	Yes	Executive	Co-wrote with Alex Kurtzman
2009	Transformers: Revenge of the Fallen	Yes	No	Co-wrote with Ehren Kruger and Alex Kurtzman
2009	The Proposal	No	Executive	
2011	Cowboys & Aliens	Yes	Yes	Co-wrote with Alex Kurtzman, Damon Lindelof, Steve Oedekerk, Mark Fergus and Hawk Ostby
2012	People Like Us	Yes	Yes	Co-wrote with Alex Kurtzman and Jody Lambert
2013	Star Trek Into Darkness	Yes	Yes	Co-wrote with Alex Kurtzman and Damon Lindelof
2013	Now You See Me	No	Yes	
2013	Ender's Game	No	Yes	
2014	The Amazing Spider-Man 2	Yes	Executive	Co-wrote with Alex Kurtzman, Jeff Pinkner and James Vanderbilt
2016	Now You See Me 2	No	Yes	
2016	Star Trek Beyond	Uncredited	Yes	
2017	The Mummy	Uncredited	Executive	

=== Television credits ===
Year	TV Program	Credit	Notes	Ref
1997–1998	Hercules: The Legendary Journeys	Writer, co-executive producer		
1999–2000	Xena: Warrior Princess	Writer, co-executive producer, creative consultant		
2000	Jack of All Trades	Writer, executive producer		
2001–2006	Alias	Writer, supervising producer, co-executive producer, executive producer		
2004	The Secret Service	Co-creator, co-writer, executive producer	Pilot	
2008–2013	Fringe	Co-creator, writer, executive producer, consulting producer	Nominated – Hugo Award for Best Dramatic Presentation, Short Form (2013); Nominated – Writers Guild of America Award for Long Form – Original (2009); Nominated – Writers Guild of America Award for New Series (2009)	
2010–2013	Transformers: Prime	Executive producer	Won – Emmy Award for Outstanding Special Class Animated Program (2012)	
2010–2020	Hawaii Five-0	Developer, writer, executive producer		
2011	Locke & Key	Co-creator, co-writer, executive producer, editor	Pilot	
2011	Exit Strategy	Co-creator, co-writer, executive producer, editor	Pilot	
2013–2017	Sleepy Hollow	Co-creator, co-writer, executive producer, editor		
2014	Matador	Co-creator, co-writer, executive producer		
2014	Scorpion	Executive producer		
2015–2016	Limitless	Executive producer		
