= Space Seed =

- Star Trek: The Original Series episode
- Episode no.: Season 1 Episode 22
- Directed by: Marc Daniels
- Story by: Carey Wilber
- Teleplay by: Gene L. Coon; Carey Wilber
- Cinematography by: Jerry Finnerman
- Production code: 023/024 (Note: Listed as Production Code 024 on StarTrek.com; Cushman & Osborn (p. 443) gives this number as 023, noting "incorrectly listed in all other sources" as 024.)
- Original air date: February 16, 1967

Guest appearances
- Ricardo Montalbán – Khan Noonien Singh; Madlyn Rhue – Lt. Marla McGivers; Blaisdell Makee – Spinelli; Mark Tobin – Joaquin; Kathy Ahart – Crew Woman; John Winston – Transporter Technician

Episode chronology
| ← Previous "The Return of the Archons" | Next → "A Taste of Armageddon" |
- Star Trek: The Original Series season 1

"Space Seed" is an episode of the American science fiction television series Star Trek. It is the 22nd episode of the first season and was first broadcast by NBC on February 16, 1967. "Space Seed" was written by Gene L. Coon and Carey Wilber and directed by Marc Daniels. Set in the 23rd century, the series follows the adventures of Captain James T. Kirk (William Shatner) and his crew aboard the Starfleet starship USS Enterprise. In this episode, the Enterprise crew encounter a sleeper ship holding genetically engineered superpeople from Earth's past. Their leader, Khan Noonien Singh (Ricardo Montalbán), attempts to take control of Enterprise. The episode also guest stars Madlyn Rhue as Lt. Marla McGivers, who becomes romantically involved with Khan.

Wilber conceived the general plot for a different series, Captain Video and His Video Rangers, which featured humans from Ancient Greece who were preserved in cryogenic suspension and revived. The script changed numerous times during preproduction as producer Bob Justman felt that it would be too expensive to film. Eventually Gene L. Coon and series creator Gene Roddenberry also made alterations. These revisions include the marooning of the criminals at the end of the episode, and the change of the main villain from a Nordic character to a Sikh. Roddenberry attempted to claim the primary writing credit for "Space Seed", a request turned down by the Writers Guild of America.

Montalbán was the casting director's first choice for Khan and described the role as "wonderful". Despite being planned as an inexpensive bottle episode, the special sets and shots using starship miniatures caused the episode to go over budget. On first broadcast, the episode held second place in the ratings for the first half-hour with 13.12 million viewers, but during the second half it was pushed into third place. "Space Seed" has been named one of the best episodes of the series by Cinefantastique, IGN, and other publications. The 1982 film Star Trek II: The Wrath of Khan serves as a sequel to this episode. Plot elements of the episode and The Wrath of Khan were also used in the 2013 film Star Trek Into Darkness and the 2025 Star Trek: Khan audio drama, and references to it appear in episodes of Star Trek: Enterprise and Star Trek: Strange New Worlds.

== Plot ==
The USS Enterprise finds the SS Botany Bay adrift in space. A landing party consisting of Captain Kirk, Doctor Leonard McCoy, Chief Engineer Montgomery Scott, and historian Lieutenant Marla McGivers beams over to the derelict. The landing party finds a cargo of dozens of humans still alive in suspended animation after nearly 200 years. McGivers identifies the group's leader, who begins to revive and is taken back to Enterprise for medical examination.

Kirk has Botany Bay taken in tow by a tractor beam, and Enterprise sets course for Starbase 12. In sickbay, the group's leader awakens and introduces himself as "Khan". McGivers marvels over Khan, a living relic from the 20th century, her field of interest. First Officer Spock discovers that their guest is actually 20th-century dictator Khan Noonien Singh, who, along with his people, are products of selective breeding designed to create perfect humans. The genetic superhumans instead became tyrants and conquered more than a third of the planet during the Eugenics Wars of the 1990s.

Khan is placed under guard in quarters. McGivers is sent to brief him on current events. Taking advantage of McGivers' attraction towards him, Khan tells her he means to rule mankind again and needs her help. Reluctantly, she agrees, and Khan revives the rest of his people and takes control of Enterprise. Khan throws Kirk into a decompression chamber, and threatens to slowly suffocate him unless Enterprise's command crew agree to follow him. Having a change of heart, McGivers frees Kirk from the chamber. Kirk and Spock vent anesthetic gas throughout the entire ship to disable Khan and his people. Khan escapes the gas and goes to Engineering, where he attempts to destroy Enterprise, but Kirk confronts him and knocks Khan unconscious in the resulting fight.

Kirk holds a hearing to decide the fate of Khan and his people. Rather than sending them to a penal colony, Kirk offers Khan and his people exile to Ceti Alpha V, a harsh world that he believes would be a perfect place for Khan to "tame". Khan accepts, citing Milton's Paradise Lost that it is better to reign in hell than serve in heaven. Kirk allows McGivers to go with Khan, rather than be court-martialed. Spock notes that it would be interesting to see what Khan makes of Ceti Alpha V in 100 years.

== Production ==
=== Writing ===
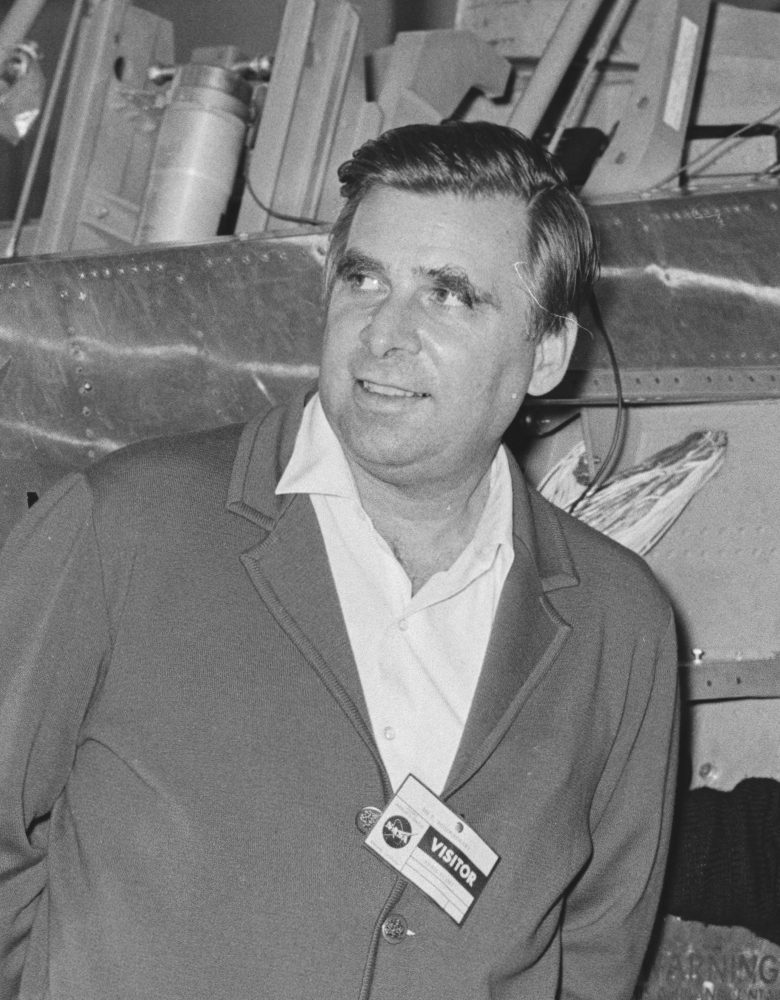
The Writers Guild of America denied permission for Gene Roddenberry to get a writing credit on the script for "Space Seed".

Carey Wilber was hired to write a script for an episode of Star Trek. His idea was based on an episode he wrote for the television series Captain Video and His Video Rangers (1949–1955). His work on that show featured Ancient Greek-era humans transported in suspended animation through space, with the people of the future finding that they have mythological powers. For "Space Seed", Wilber replaced these mythological powers with abilities that were enhanced due to genetic engineering. Wilber had briefly worked with Gene Roddenberry on the television series Harbourmaster. His science fiction extended beyond Star Trek: he also wrote scripts for Lost in Space and The Time Tunnel around the same time.

In Wilber's first proposal for the story that became "Space Seed", dated August 29, 1966 (shortly before the first episode of Star Trek aired) the villain was Harold Erickson, an ordinary criminal exiled into space. He sought to free his gang from Botany Bay, seize Enterprise, and become a pirate. Parts of the story were inspired by the use of penal colonies in the 18th century, and characterizations were based on descriptions from the series' writer's bible. As a result, several elements of the draft differed from how the characters behaved in the series; for example, the draft includes a scene where Spock defeats Kirk at chess by cheating. Producer Gene L. Coon told Wilber that his work was the best outline he had seen during his time on Star Trek. Fellow producer Bob Justman was less enthusiastic; he compared it negatively to Flash Gordon and Buck Rogers, and felt the concept would be too expensive to film. There were also concerns that an unsolicited script submitted by science fiction author Philip José Farmer resembled the proposed plot which, as Roddenberry had corresponded with Farmer, might lead to litigation.

NBC executives reviewed the plot for "Space Seed" and approved it, but Justman reassessed the outline, saying that it needed to be heavily revised. In September, Wilber was given a list of suggested changes including asking him to remove any mention of the setting, as the producers did not want to say how far in the future Star Trek was set, and to remove the chess scene. Wilber submitted a second draft, but Roddenberry still had problems with basic elements of the script. He did not believe common criminals would be fired into space as a solution and strongly disliked the notion of space pirates. The second draft introduced the idea that Kirk marooned Erickson and his crew on a new planet; this remained in the final version. Wilber was not asked for a third draft; Coon was tasked with the re-write; he submitted it on December 7 and updated it twice over the following five days. Wilber accepted Coon's re-writes, and left the staff after the submission of his second draft as his contractual obligations were complete.

Coon proposed that Erickson should be a rival to Kirk, a genetic superman who had once ruled part of Earth. Roddenberry and Justman were still unhappy with the script, and Roddenberry revised it once more a week before filming was due to begin, after Montalbán had been cast. In this draft the blond Nordic character of Erickson became closer to the version seen on screen. In Roddenberry and Coon's script, the character was renamed Sibahl Khan Noonien. The name Govin Bahadur Singh was suggested by the DeForest Research company, who checked scripts for potential errors on behalf of the production company; the Singh name was suggested in part because it was closer to actual Sikh names. Coon and Roddenberry settled on Khan Noonien Singh; Roddenberry had an old Chinese friend named Noonien Wang that he had lost touch with, and hoped that Wang would see the episode and contact him. In the final draft, Roddenberry listed himself as the primary writer, Coon as co-writer and Wilber was absent, but the Writers Guild of America turned down Roddenberry's request to be credited; Coon received the main credit; Wilber was given co-writer and "story-by" credits. Wilber did not often watch his own work, and nearly thirty years later had never seen "Space Seed". Coon was later credited as Lee Cronin for his part in production of the script.

=== Casting ===
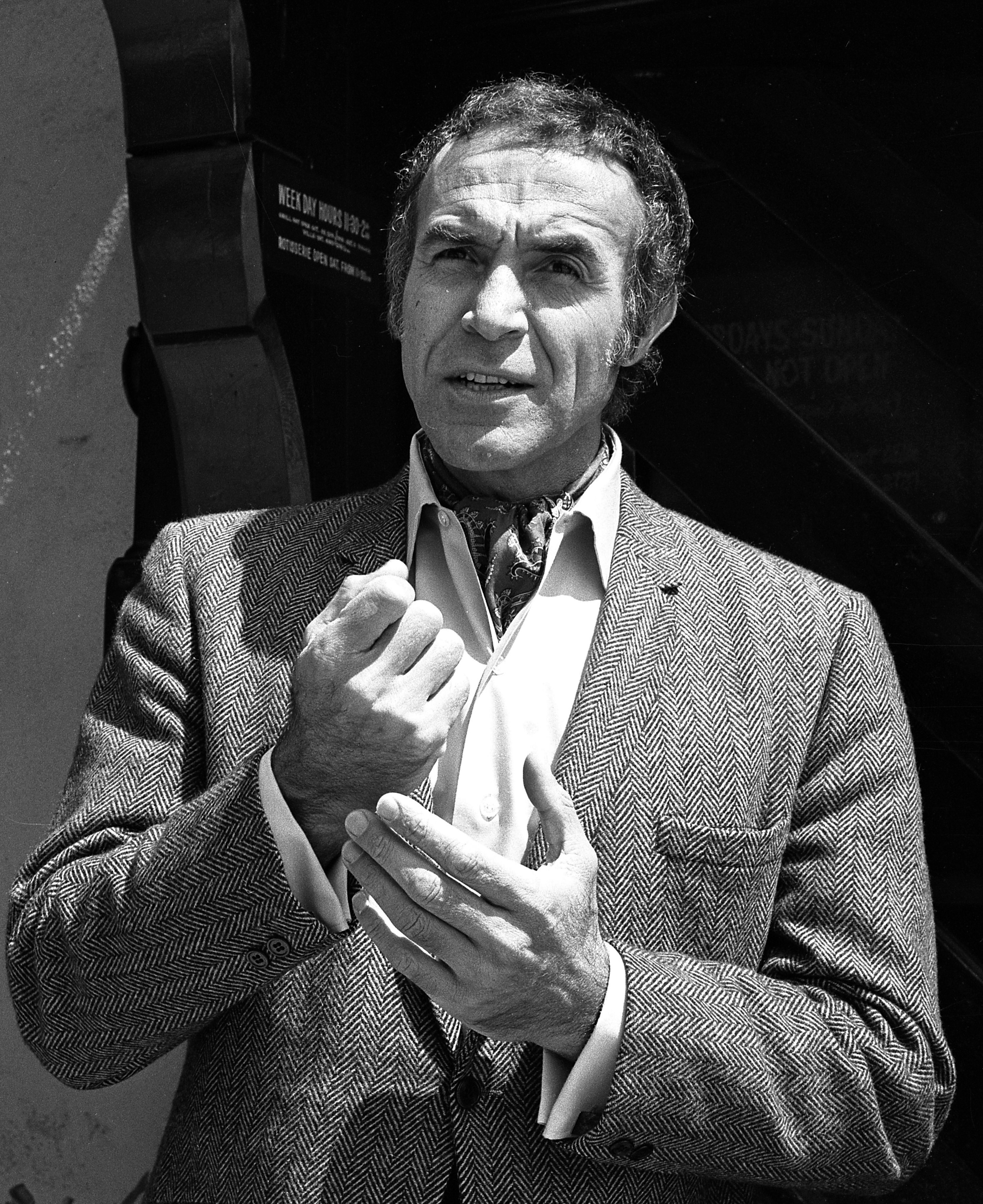
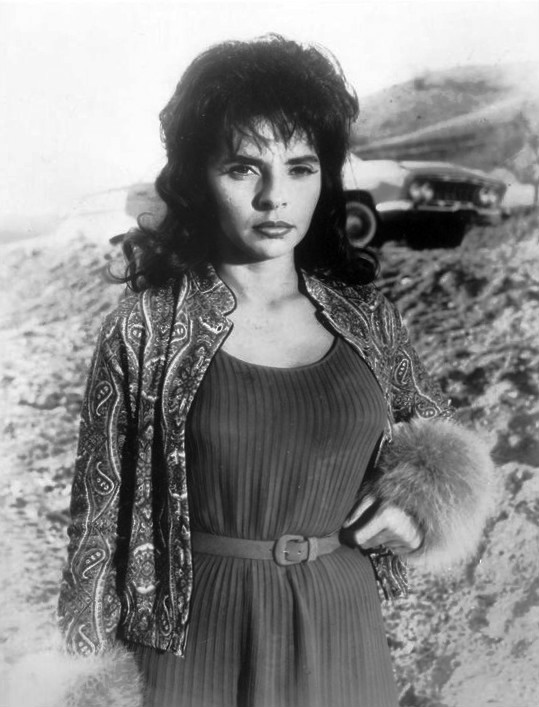
Ricardo Montalbán (left) was cast as Khan Noonien Singh. Madlyn Rhue (right) was cast as Lt. Marla McGivers in "Space Seed"; Rhue had worked previously with Montalbán and Roddenberry on other projects.

Mexican actor Ricardo Montalbán was cast as the genetic superman Khan Noonian Singh, having been the first choice for the role. He had been suggested by casting director Joseph D'Agosta, who was not looking to cast an actor of a particular ethnic background due to Roddenberry's vision for the series; Roddenberry wanted to show his perceived 23rd century values by not requiring any specific ethnicities when casting actors in guest roles. Montalbán had previously appeared in a television movie created by Roddenberry, The Secret Weapon of 117 (also referred to as The Secret Defense of 117), which was the writer's first attempt to create science fiction on television and aired more than ten years before Star Trek. Montalbán called his role as Khan "wonderful", saying that "it was well-written, it had an interesting concept and I was delighted it was offered to me". The main cast were enthusiastic about working with Montalbán; DeForest Kelley later said "I enjoyed working with Ricardo the best. I was privileged. He is a marvelous actor."

Madlyn Rhue, who portrayed Lt. Marla McGivers, had previously worked with Montalbán in an episode of Bonanza in 1960 as his on-screen wife; she later appeared with him in a 1982 episode of Fantasy Island. Montalbán and Rhue also appeared in separate episodes of Roddenberry's previous NBC television series, The Lieutenant (1963–1964). Main cast member George Takei did not appear in "Space Seed"; the character of Hikaru Sulu was replaced by Blaisdell Makee as Lt. Spinelli. It was the first of two appearances in Star Trek for Makee, who returned in the episode "The Changeling" as Lt. Singh. John Winston appeared for the second time as Lt. Kyle, and went on to make nine further episodic appearances in that role. Following positive feedback from the producers and the network regarding James Doohan, "Space Seed" was the first episode to feature a more prominent role for his character, Chief Engineer Montgomery Scott.

=== Filming, costumes and post production ===
Filming of "Space Seed" began December 15, 1966, and concluded on December 22 after six days of shooting. Roddenberry, Coon and Wilber's rewrites resulted in a shooting script of nearly 60 pages and 120 scenes. Marc Daniels was hired to direct the episode; he had previously worked on The Lieutenant. The first day's filming coincided with the airing of the episode "Balance of Terror", and Daniels allowed the cast and crew to go home early to watch it. The other five days ran to schedule, to the extent that there was an early finish on the final day of filming, allowing cast and crew time to return home to watch a repeat of the episode "What Are Little Girls Made Of?" which had replaced "Arena" on that evening's schedule. A scene filmed but later cut from the episode depicted a discussion between McGivers and Angela Martine (Barbara Baldavin), intended to show that McGivers was looking for a forceful man. Further scenes were trimmed after filming following input from NBC. For example, scenes shot on the Botany Bay were cut as executives felt the costumes worn by the newly awakened crew were too revealing.

The character of Khan required five costumes, more than any other guest star in the entire series. This meant that the staff working on costumes had less time to devote to any one costume. Montalbán's athletic physique was such that when his measurements were passed to them, staff thought there had been a mistake. Costume designer William Ware Theiss found it challenging to produce the outfits in the time allotted, to make the materials seem suitably futuristic and to fit his own preferences in design. Two of Khan's outfits re-used previous costumes, while three were specifically created for Montalbán. The production built two new sets for the episode: the decompression chamber in sickbay, and the set on board Botany Bay. A doorframe from that set was later reused as an overhead unit in McCoy's research lab, which appeared later in the series.

Post-production on "Space Seed" began on December 23, 1966, and ran through February 5 the following year. The Westheimer Company produced the majority of effects in the episode, but the scenes of Enterprise and Botany Bay in space were produced by Film Effects of Hollywood who were not credited on screen for their work. Botany Bay utilized a design Matt Jefferies created prior to the USS Enterprise. It had been previously labeled "antique space freighter", and was built by Film Effects of Hollywood. The creation of the ship miniature caused the episode to go over budget by more than $12,000; "Space Seed" actually cost a total of $197,262 against a budget of $180,000. By this point, the series was nearly $80,000 over budget in total. The Botany Bay model was later re-purposed as a freighter for the episode "The Ultimate Computer".

The sound effects team borrowed effects and manipulated them in order to achieve the "painted sound" effect sought by Roddenberry. Although a number of sources were used, they attempted to avoid most science fiction television series as they wanted an authentic sound. The sound archive of the United States Air Force was used, although the photon torpedo sound was created from the 1953 film The War of the Worlds. "Space Seed" was awarded the Golden Reel for sound editing on television by the Motion Picture Sound Editors society.

== Reception ==
=== Broadcast ===
"Space Seed" was first broadcast in the United States on February 16, 1967, on NBC. A 12-city overnight Trendex report compiled by Nielsen ratings showed that during the first half-hour, it held second place in the ratings behind Bewitched on ABC with 13.12 million viewers compared to Bewitched's 14.44 million. The episode beat My Three Sons on CBS. During the second half-hour it was pushed into third place in the ratings by the start of the Thursday Night Movie on CBS, the Western film One-Eyed Jacks starring Marlon Brando, which received 35.5 percent of the audience share compared to 28 percent for "Space Seed".

A high-definition remastering of "Space Seed", which introduced new special effects and starship exteriors as well as enhanced music and audio, was shown for the first time on November 18, 2006, in broadcast syndication. It was the eleventh remastered episode to be shown. This meant that the episode was made available to over 200 local stations across the United States with the rights to broadcast Star Trek, and depending on the station it was broadcast either on November 18 or 19.

=== Critical reception ===
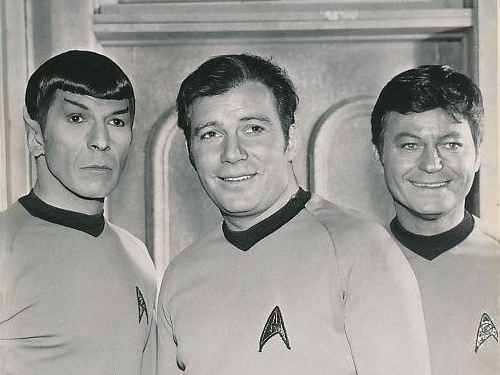
Michelle Erica Green called Khan a perfect foil for Spock, Kirk, and McCoy (pictured left to right).

In 1967, The Indiana Gazette described "Space Seed" as "a good piece of science fiction". The Kokomo Tribune called it "imaginative", and also said that the episode was "particularly interesting" for "its commentary on the scientific know-how of the late 1990s".

Later reviewers watched the episodes several decades after broadcast. Zack Handlen of The A.V. Club gave the episode an 'A' rating, noting its strong characters and the interplay between Kirk and Spock that emphasizes their friendship. Michelle Erica Green called the episode "legendary" in her review for TrekNation. She thought that Khan made the "perfect foil" for the trio of Kirk, Spock and McCoy and said that the episode was not dulled by later episodes and films based on "Space Seed". In Mark Pickavance's review at Den of Geek, he said that it remained an "obvious choice of great source material" to be followed up in a film.

The review by Eugene Myers and Torrie Atkinson on Tor.com criticized the attraction between McGivers and Khan, saying that it was "really uncomfortable to watch her immediate attraction to him and her easy acceptance of his abusive and controlling behavior". Both praised the episode, Myers giving it a five out of six, and Atkinson a six out of six rating. Tor.com also placed "Space Seed" at number three of Star Trek's most underappreciated elements, saying that, "As an introductory story to what old school Star Trek was all about, 'Space Seed' is perfect. It presents an original science fiction concept, grapples with notions of human technology and ingenuity creating a monster, and features Captain Kirk beating the crap out of someone with a piece of Styrofoam. What more could you want?"

The episode appears in numerous publications’ lists of top Original Series episodes, including Newsweek, Forbes, Collider, TV Guide, Vulture, and Entertainment Weekly; IGN ranked "Space Seed" as the fourth best, praising the fist fight between Kirk and Khan. It appeared in the top ten episodes listed by Cinefantastique and was also included in a list of ten "must see" Star Trek episodes on The A.V. Club. Handlen said that it "features a terrific performance from guest star Montalbán, gives the franchise one of its greatest villains, and sets the stage for one of the best science-fiction adventure movies ever made".

== Home media release and other adaptations ==
The first adaptation of "Space Seed" was as a re-working into a short story by author James Blish as part of the novelization Star Trek 2. This book contained seven short stories, each based on an episode of The Original Series and was published in 1968. The adaptation of "Space Seed" appeared as the final story in the book.

"Space Seed" was the first Star Trek episode to go on public sale, sold as a single-episode VHS cassette in June 1982 by Paramount Home Video. It was one of the episodes of The Original Series published on Capacitance Electronic Disc, alongside "The Changeling", released on November 1, 1982. A LaserDisc of the episode, alongside "The Return of the Archons" was released in 1985. Further releases of all episodes of the series were made on VHS and Betamax. These releases reverted to a single episode tape as in the original 1982 version.

The episode was released on DVD paired with "A Taste of Armageddon" as part of the general release of the series in 2000. There were no additional extras added to that entire series of releases, except the DVD containing "Turnabout Intruder". (Note: This featured two versions of the original Star Trek pilot, "The Cage".) "Space Seed" was later released within a DVD box set of the first season in 2004; all three seasons of The Original Series were released as full-season box sets that year. The episode was included in the remastered season one release on DVD and Blu-ray in 2009. This release featured CGI remodels of Enterprise and other space scenes, including the Botany Bay. The most recent release is as part of the Star Trek: Origins collection on Blu-ray, which was released in 2013.

== Legacy ==
=== Khan ===
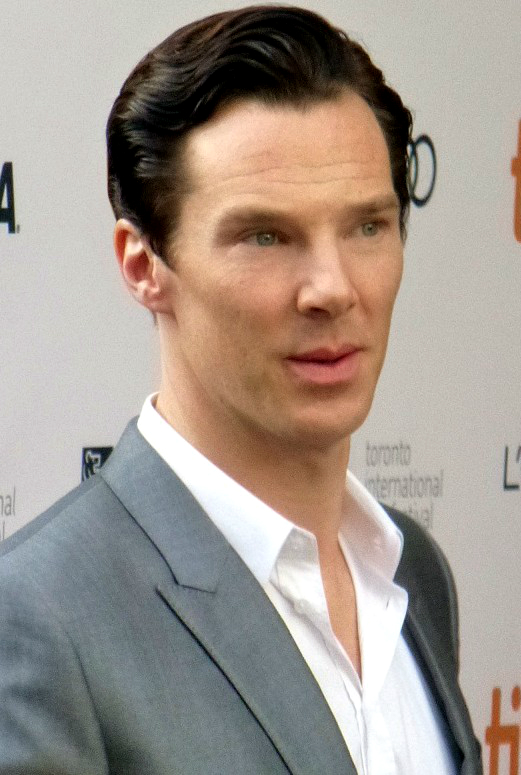
Benedict Cumberbatch portrayed Khan in Star Trek Into Darkness (2013).

The events of "Space Seed" are followed up in the 1982 film Star Trek II: The Wrath of Khan. Harve Bennett was hired to produce a sequel to Star Trek: The Motion Picture having never seen the television series; he watched every episode in preparation and latched onto Khan from "Space Seed" as the compelling villain he considered to be lacking from the first film.

In reprising the role of Khan, Montalbán worried that fans would see him only as Mr. Roarke from Fantasy Island but felt that he managed to recapture the character after re-watching "Space Seed". The film set a record for the opening weekend gross of $14.3 million, and went on to take $78.9 million domestically within the United States, making it the sixth best-selling film of the year.

Khan recognizes Pavel Chekov even though the character did not feature in "Space Seed"; indeed Chekov did not make a screen appearance in Star Trek until season two. This was described in Deborah Cartmell and Imelda Whelehan's book, Adaptations: From Text to Screen, Screen to Text as the "gaffe notorious throughout Star Trek fandom". However, "Catspaw" features Chekov and has an earlier Stardate than "Space Seed", confirming that he joined Enterprise before Khan's arrival. The novelization of The Wrath of Khan states that Chekov was working on the night shift at the time of the events of "Space Seed".

Events of both "Space Seed" and The Wrath of Khan were also directly referenced in 2013's Star Trek Into Darkness, in which Benedict Cumberbatch portrayed Khan. The film took $70.1 million on the opening weekend, and $467.3 million internationally throughout the cinematic release.

The television series Star Trek: Enterprise makes several further references to the events first described in "Space Seed". In "Twilight", the survivors of the Xindi attack on Earth eventually resettle on Ceti Alpha V. The development of Khan and his followers were said to have been through selective breeding in "Space Seed". American sociologist William Sims Bainbridge said that this method would have been unable to create genetic supermen in such a short space of time and that today the less implausible method of genetic engineering (directly changing the DNA code) would be used. In fact, subsequent references to the creation of Khan and the other supermen, such as in the Star Trek: Deep Space Nine episode "Doctor Bashir, I Presume?", substituted genetic engineering.

A non-canonical novelization by Greg Cox was later released in 2005 to fill in the timeframe between "Space Seed" and the film, titled To Reign in Hell: The Exile of Khan Noonien Singh. This book expanded on Khan's romance with McGivers, and the author wanted to "give her a spine" as he felt that she was not "the pride of Starfleet, and even less of a feminist role-model" in her appearance in "Space Seed".

As part of their line of licensed Star Trek comic books, IDW Publishing launched a non-canonical five-part mini-series titled Star Trek: Khan which described the early part of Khan's life and how the events in Star Trek Into Darkness diverged from those seen in "Space Seed". One of the film's writers, Roberto Orci, was the story consultant on the comic series. This series also explained how Khan changed physically in order to be represented by Cumberbatch in the film. A retro-style film poster for "Space Seed" was created by Juan Ortiz in 2013, released around the same as Star Trek Into Darkness.

=== Eugenics Wars ===
The Eugenics Wars, first mentioned in "Space Seed", are stated in the Star Trek Chronology by Michael and Denise Okuda as taking place between 1992 and 1996. They considered it fortunate that these events did not come to pass in the real world, and noted that the development of the Botany Bay in 1996 as an instance of where "Star Trek's technological predictions have missed by a significant margin". The war itself has been referenced elsewhere in the Star Trek franchise. The first mention of the wars following "Space Seed" was in the Star Trek: The Animated Series episode "The Infinite Vulcan", in which a cloned version of Dr. Stavos Keniclius, a scientist from that era, clones Spock. Later, during the production of "Doctor Bashir, I Presume?", writer René Echevarria, seeking a secret past for Doctor Julian Bashir, noted that coverage of the issue of eugenics in Star Trek had been limited to Khan and his followers. Fellow writer Ronald D. Moore decided to link the background of Bashir to genetic engineering. "Encounter at Farpoint" and Star Trek First Contact confused matters by saying World War III (otherwise known as The Eugenics Wars) had occurred in the 2050s. When Echevarria wrote that the Eugenics Wars took place 200 years before the Deep Space Nine episode "Doctor Bashir, I Presume?", he took the time interval directly from The Wrath of Khan, failing to factor in the additional century between the events of the original series (and its associated films).

Novelist Greg Cox first mentioned the events of the Eugenics Wars in his non-canonical novel Assignment: Eternity, which followed up on the events of the episode "Assignment: Earth" and included the characters of Gary Seven and Roberta Lincoln. In it, he mentioned that Seven and Lincoln were involved in overthrowing Khan during the Eugenics Wars. He had not intended to explore this any further, but he was prompted to do so by his editor at Pocket Books. He wrote a story, split into two books, about the specific events of the Eugenics Wars, entitled Star Trek: The Eugenics Wars: The Rise and Fall of Khan Noonien Singh. As the Eugenics Wars were already meant to have taken place, he described them as a secret history that was not discovered until generations had passed. He also felt that this approach would make the books consistent with the Star Trek: Voyager episode "Future's End" in which the crewmembers travel in time to the same period of Earth's history as the Eugenics Wars, but find no such wars taking place. A further version of the Eugenics Wars was presented in the Star Trek: Khan comic book mini-series.

The Enterprise season four episodes "Borderland", "Cold Station 12" and "The Augments" showed a further group of genetic superpeople produced from embryos produced in the same era as Khan and his crew. This was a deliberate link by the producers of Enterprise to both "Space Seed" and The Wrath of Khan, and was one of several plots during the fourth season of the show to include elements of Star Trek: The Original Series in the hope that this would boost ratings.
