= Eugenics wars =

Eugenics wars may refer to:

- In the Star Trek fictional universe, the Eugenics Wars are a series of conflicts that occurred between 1992 and 1996, in which the progeny of a human genetic engineering project established themselves as superior "superhumans" and attempted world domination. The Eugenics Wars preceded and catalyzed World War III beginning in 2026 and ending in 2053. The Eugenics Wars were also, at times, referred to as World War III.
- The Eugenics Wars: The Rise and Fall of Khan Noonien Singh, a two volume set of novels written by Greg Cox about the life of the fictional Star Trek character Khan Noonien Singh.
