= The Eugenics Wars: The Rise and Fall of Khan Noonien Singh =

2001–05 novel trilogy by Greg Cox, part of the Star Trek franchise

The Eugenics Wars: The Rise and Fall of Khan Noonien Singh; and: To Reign in Hell: The Exile of Khan Noonien Singh
- Volume 1
- Author: Greg Cox
- Cover artist: Keith Birdsong
- Language: English
- Series: Star Trek: Eugenics Wars
- Genre: Science fiction
- Publisher: Pocket Books
- Publication date: July 1, 2001 (Volume 1); April 1, 2002 (Volume 2); January 2005 (Volume 3)
- Publication place: United States
- Pages: First edition, hardcover: 404 pages (Volume 1); 338 pages (Volume 2); 336 pages (Volume 3)
- ISBN: 0-671-02127-3 (vol. 1); 0-7434-0643-5 (vol. 2); 0-7434-5711-0 (vol. 3)

The Eugenics Wars is a three volume miniseries of novels written by Greg Cox about the life of the fictional Star Trek character Khan Noonien Singh. He is often referred to as simply "Khan" in the Star Trek episode "Space Seed" and in the Star Trek film Star Trek II: The Wrath of Khan.

The first two novels (subtitled The Rise and Fall of Khan Noonien Singh) detail Khan's life until he leaves the Earth in the DY-100 sleeper ship SS Botany Bay later found by the Enterprise. They are written mostly in the perspective of the fictional characters Gary Seven and Roberta Lincoln, Gary Seven's partner. Both characters appear in the Star Trek episode "Assignment: Earth". The third and final book (subtitled The Exile of Khan Noonien Singh) deals with the life of Khan after he was marooned on Ceti Alpha V by Captain James T. Kirk.

These books are mentioned in the Director's Edition DVD of The Wrath of Khan, in an interview contained as one of the extras. Greg Cox explains that the passing of the 1990s in reality required a reinterpretation of the Eugenics Wars that were originally said to take place in the same decade.

== Plot summary ==
=== The Rise and Fall of Khan Noonien Singh, Volume One ===
The first volume deals mostly with the extraterrestrial agent Gary Seven and his partner Roberta Lincoln's effort to infiltrate and eventually shut down the 'Chrysalis Project' a secret yet pioneering eugenics program responsible for Khan Noonien Singh and a generation of genetically engineered superior humans. The progeny of Chrysalis are smarter, stronger, faster and more resilient than any humans born naturally would or could ever hope to be. They possess superior lungs, circulatory systems, reflexes and enhanced senses. When the story begins, Khan is about four years old, and is called "Noon". Already demonstrating remarkable charisma and leadership even among the children, he is one of (possibly the greatest of) the genetically engineered "Children of Chrysalis". While supposedly mentally and physically superior to ordinary men and women, the genetically engineered children often show signs of grandiose egos and profound psychological imbalances. The scientists of Chrysalis intend for their creations to take over the Earth by merit of the superior genetics, while the project's lead scientist (and Khan's mother) Saurina Kahr harbors an even more secret plan to release a flesh eating biological weapon upon the 'inferior' normal human race, to make way for her superior offspring. When Gary Seven and Roberta Lincoln learn about the project, Roberta goes undercover as a scientist and is sent to the project's underground complex beneath the Thar Desert in India. She finds a breakthrough genetics program, one that many sincere scientists and geneticists have come to work on. Dissent or revelation, however, are dealt with severely, often fatally. Seven is captured trying to infiltrate the base.

Once there, Roberta discovers the dark secret to Chrysalis - children born to the project who are found to have genetic aberrations from the rewriting of their DNA are kept in padded rooms and hidden from the rest of the project. Roberta frees Seven and the two attempt to resolve the crisis with the least harm and without drawing attention. Needing to halt the plan to poison the world and still rescue the children, Roberta and Gary Seven finally decide to use the project's own fail safe option and blow up the nuclear reactor that runs the underground complex. Not wishing anyone to harm innocents, they allow the staff to evacuate and use Gary's matter transporter to send the hundreds of children sired by the project (including the then-young Noonien Singh) to safety. The complex is destroyed, along with Khan's mother, who refuses to leave her life's work. The nuclear explosion is covered up as the first nuclear test by the Indian government.

Gary Seven places the children with family whenever possible, all around the world, and keeps track of the youthful superman for the next several years. Seven even initially hopes to train Khan as an agent and his eventual successor- both Khan's ambitions and innate talents need molding and mentoring. Seven feels that with the development of conscience and empathy, Khan could be a great force for the good of humanity. Unfortunately, circumstances (including the assassination of Indira Gandhi and the resultant backlash against Sikhs, as well as the poison gas disaster at Bhopal that kill thousands of his kinsman) harden Khan's resolve to rule the world. At the age of 15, he officially embraces the name and title of Khan. Khan rejects Seven's mission as timid and ineffective. He dramatically ends his on again off again uneasy relationship with Seven by invading his New York offices, destroying the Beta 5 AI supercomputer that Seven regularly employed, and threatening to kill Seven and Lincoln should they try to thwart his ambitions of world domination.

=== The Rise and Fall of Khan Noonien Singh, Volume Two ===
In the second volume, Seven tries to prevent World War Three from breaking out. He has to deal not only with Khan, but with many of the other "Children of Chrysalis," most of whom are now major political figures (including an African military strongman, a European dictator, an American leader of a separatist movement, and a religious cult leader).

The superhuman men and women begin to battle for power and several of them manage to gain influence. None, however, have more power than Khan. At first, Khan seems to be building an empire, but, after several assassination attempts by fellow supermen and riots of his people, he begins to lose everything.

After Khan feels that he is doomed to be defeated, he begins to power up his Morning Star satellite, which will destroy the ozone layer and kill all life on Earth after he dies. Seven convinces Khan that it would be better to forge a new life elsewhere, using the stolen DY-100 sleeper ship that he and Roberta obtained from Area 51. Khan and a large group of the other superhumans leave on the ship in search of a better life. The novel ends in 1996 as Seven leaves Earth for retirement.

=== Volume Three: To Reign in Hell: The Exile of Khan Noonien Singh ===
The book begins with Khan, Lt. Marla McGivers, and most of the other supermen and women that had been with him on the SS Botany Bay arriving on the planet Ceti Alpha V. Khan is given supplies and a phaser and begins to build a colony on the planet. Khan is challenged several times by his fellow supermen, but remains in control for the most part.

Six months after the supermen arrive, the next planet in the Ceti Alpha system, Ceti Alpha VI, explodes and disrupts the orbit of Ceti Alpha V. This causes major climate changes and loss of plant and animal life. Khan and the supermen take refuge underground and Khan waits for Kirk to arrive and rescue him and his followers from the hell that the planet has become.

After more time passes, several supermen do not wish to follow Khan any longer and try to assassinate Khan by placing a Ceti eel in Marla McGivers's ear. This indigenous creature invades the brain and makes the victim susceptible to mind control, and the men order her to kill Khan. Marla's love for Khan allows her to resist enough to kill herself instead. The eel emerges from her ear after her death, and Khan sees the reason why she died.

After the failed assassination, the rebels leave the underground and form a new faction on the planet, taking control of the vital hot springs that provide the only water on the planet. Khan then battles them, losing many of his followers, but winning in the end.

At the end of the novel a few years later, Khan sees two men in space suits materialize on the planet's surface.

Throughout the novel, Khan blames his hardships on James Kirk for stranding him on the planet and never checking on him again.

== Secondary plots ==
=== Volumes One and Two ===
The first two novels contain a framing story about James T. Kirk going on a top-secret mission to the Paragon Colony on the planet Sycorax, which wishes to become a part of the United Federation of Planets. The problem is that the planet is inhabited by genetically altered humans. This goes against the current laws of the Federation and, therefore, Starfleet Command has kept the Colony's request secret. Dr. McCoy wonders if the members of Starfleet have "lost their paper-pushing minds" in even considering to allow the Colony to join but Spock feels that the Federation could make room for the Paragon Colony. However, it is up to Kirk whether or not to recommend the Colony for Federation membership.

After arriving it is discovered that the Klingons have sent a ship of their own in the hopes of getting the Colony to join the Klingon Empire to help them with their own genetics programs. However, after several incidents, the colonists order the Klingons to leave, but not before a bomb is placed in the Colony and a hole is blown in the dome that protects the city from the harsh conditions of the planet. Kirk then takes a shuttlecraft and extends its shields around the hole in the dome. However, this leaves the shuttle vulnerable to the planet's weather.

In the end, Kirk saves the Colony but does not allow it to join the Federation.

=== Volume Three ===
To Reign in Hell also has a frame story with James T. Kirk, Hikaru Sulu, Spock, and Leonard McCoy going to Ceti Alpha V after the events of the second, third, and fourth Star Trek movies had already taken place. Kirk is filled with guilt and wishes to find out more about Khan's life on the planet. He leads a landing party to the bunker that is shown in the second movie. In their search, they accidentally stumble upon a sarcophagus for Marla that was built by Khan with Marla's mummified remains within. In another sarcophagus, likely meant for Khan, Spock finds data tapes and records and Khan's personal journal. This is when the book moves into Khan's story.

At certain points along the way and after Khan's story is complete, the book continues with Kirk's story. He and the rest of the party explore the tunnels that are beneath the bunker to learn even more about Khan's life. Before they leave, the landing party is accosted by Ericsson's daughter and a few other surviving superhumans from the second faction who were exiled from the colony, but had taken over the bunker in Khan's absence. They demand to know Khan's whereabouts, not knowing that he had left the planet and subsequently died. The young Ericsson also destroys Marla's remains with a phaser she took from the landing party. She then wants to kill Kirk, "the Abandoner", for everything that he did. Kirk manages to convince the young Ericsson that Khan was indeed dead and their fight was over. Kirk offers to take all of the supermen and women to Sycorax, a planet populated by genetically altered humans that was mentioned in the frame story of the first two novels in this trilogy. The superhumans agree to go with Kirk and say that Kirk may not be "the Abandoner" after all. Then Kirk instructs Sulu to go back to the Mutara Sector, and he then beamed Marla's ashes into the debris field created when the Genesis Planet exploded, so that she and Khan could at least be together. Kirk also hopes that as husband and wife were reunited that somewhere, somehow, Marla McGivers and Khan Singh have both finally found peace.

== Historical notes ==
At the end of both the first and second novel, covering a fictive version of the 20th century, is a "Historical Notes" section that states what events in the novel were based in fact, although the novel describes their true causes as a secret history.

One example is that there actually was a nuclear explosion beneath the desert in Rajasthan. In Chapter 23 of the first novel, Gary Seven and Roberta Lincoln trigger the explosion to destroy the headquarters of the Chrysalis Project, which history describes as the successful atomic test known as "Smiling Buddha".

Several other unrelated events in real-world history are linked together in the novel including 1984 anti-Sikh riots following the death of Indira Gandhi, the increase in the size of the hole in the ozone layer above Antarctica in the summer of 1992 (historically caused by the eruption of Mount Pinatubo), and the earthquake in Maharashtra in September 1993.

== Additional fictional characters ==
In the first two volumes, Cox includes several characters, familiar items and moments from throughout the Star Trek universe, including Redjac (the murderous alien entity which had possessed Jack the Ripper) from "Wolf in the Fold", Guinan, Air Force Captain Shaun Christopher, son of Captain John Christopher from 'Tomorrow is Yesterday', Gillian Taylor and Dr. Marcus Nichols from Star Trek IV: The Voyage Home, Shannon O'Donnell, a direct ancestor of Kathryn Janeway, Doctor Jeff Carlson, (who met Ferengis Quark, Rom and Nog when they traveled back in time to 1947 Roswell, New Mexico), Claire Raymond, Ralph Offenhouse, and L.Q. "Sonny" Clemonds, the cryogenically frozen patients found by the Enterprise-D in "The Neutral Zone". and Flint the immortal (living as Dr. Evergreen) from "Requiem for Methuselah". He also mentions pioneering 1950s African American author Benny Russell (Captain Benjamin Sisko's literary alternate identity from the Deep Space Nine episode "Far Beyond the Stars"), as well as strategically placing a large and heavy hardcover copy of Chicago Mobs of the 1920s (the selfsame book that caused a huge cultural contamination shown in the original series episode "A Piece of the Action") in one scene. He also references the phaser and tricorder left behind by Chekov in Star Trek IV: The Voyage Home.

Cox also includes fictional characters of the era from other sources, such as Jaime Sommers, from The Bionic Woman live action series, Robert McCall from The Equalizer television series, Vincent from Beauty and the Beast 1987 television series, and Hadji, from the Jonny Quest franchise. It is also mentioned that Gary Seven and Lincoln encountered the robotic housewives from The Stepford Wives and the murderous pagan cult depicted in The Wicker Man.

== Reception ==
Michelle Erica Green of TrekNation wrote: "Cox writes with great wit and an obvious love of Trek lore, though his greatest accomplishment lies in the way he links together seemingly unconnected 20th century events into a complex conspiracy that makes The X-Files seem unsophisticated." Reviewing the second volume, Green wrote: "The Eugenics Wars Volume Two is just as much fun as its predecessor, weaving Trek history in and out of recent headlines mostly through the point of view of one of history's more entertaining secret agents, Teri Garr look-alike Roberta Lincoln."

== See also ==
- Eugenics Wars – the main article about the Eugenics Wars in the Star Trek universe
