= Star Trek: Assignment: Earth =

Comic book series by John Byrne

Publication information
- Publisher: IDW Publishing
- Schedule: Monthly
- Publication date: May 2008 - August 2008
- No. of issues: 5

Creative team
- Created by: John Byrne
- Written by: John Byrne
- Artist: John Byrne

Star Trek: Assignment: Earth is a five-issue limited series, comic mini-series written and drawn by John Byrne, based on the events in the Star Trek second-season finale, "Assignment: Earth". The series was published by IDW Publishing and follows the adventures of interstellar agent Gary Seven and Roberta Lincoln, born on Earth. Seven and Lincoln are involved in fighting past threats that endanger Star Trek's future.

One notable story shows Gary Seven's and Roberta Lincoln's peripheral involvement in the events of a prior Star Trek episode, "Tomorrow Is Yesterday"—which, due to peculiarities of time travel, happens after "Assignment: Earth" for Seven and Roberta, but before "Assignment: Earth" for the Enterprise crew.
