= Bittersweet Love =

1976 film by David Miller

- Theatrical release poster
- Directed by: David Miller
- Written by: Adrian Morrall; D.A. Kellogg
- Produced by: Joseph Zappala; Gene Slott; Joel B. Michaels
- Starring: Lana Turner; Robert Lansing; Celeste Holm; Robert Alda; Scott Hylands; Meredith Baxter-Birney
- Cinematography: Stephen M. Katz
- Edited by: Bill Butler
- Music by: Kenneth Wannberg
- Production company: Zappala-Slott Productions
- Distributed by: Avco Embassy Pictures
- Release date: October 1976
- Running time: 92 minutes
- Country: United States
- Language: English

Bittersweet Love is a 1976 American DeLuxe Color romantic drama film directed by David Miller, written by Adrian Morrall and D.A. Kellogg, starring Lana Turner, Robert Lansing, Celeste Holm, Robert Alda, Scott Hylands, and Meredith Baxter-Birney in Panavision. The film follows a newly-married couple expecting a child that discover they are brother and sister, straining their relationship.

== Plot ==
Michael Lewis and Patricia Peterson meet in an unusual way—while on a date with another woman, Michael attempts to retrieve his date's car keys from a fountain. When his date abandons him, he meets Patricia and they soon find themselves falling in love. After learning that she is pregnant, they decide to get married and hold a small ceremony in Canada, where Michael's family lives.

Patricia's parents, Ben and Claire, have never met Michael, and are out of the country when the wedding takes place. They meet their new son-in-law after returning from their travels. While reviewing pictures from the wedding she missed, Claire is shocked to discover that she knows Michael's father; the two had a one-night stand after meeting at a USO dance years ago. This one-night stand resulted in Patricia's birth; making the newly married couple half-siblings, with a pregnancy already underway.

Distraught over the news, Patricia goes to her doctor to see if she can obtain a late-term abortion. The doctor tells her that if the fetal weight is still low, they may be able to terminate the pregnancy due to her situation. Patricia ultimately decides not to go through with the abortion, but is still wary of her relationship with Michael. The couple spend the rest of the pregnancy isolated from their friends and family.

Patricia's mother begs her to reconsider ending the pregnancy, or to go away and give the baby up for adoption, but Patricia reprimands her and says that doesn't want anymore family secrets. Michael also starts to research the history of incest, and its effects on people.

While at home, Patricia goes into labor and has Michael take her to the hospital. She later gives birth to a healthy baby girl named Amy. When their daughter is six weeks old, Michael attempts to celebrate by cooking a nice dinner for himself and Patricia. But the evening quickly turns sour when Patricia becomes hysterical as she and Michael are kissing. The couple ultimately split up; with Michael moving out of the house and Patricia keeping Amy. As she later holds her daughter, a voice-over of Patricia rings out: ″In the middle of the night I think of how it would have been never to know the truth. I put myself there and in that time before the truth I find peace and sleep. But the sleep ends, and I wake to who and what we are. Brother and sister. Strangers.″

== Cast ==
- Lana Turner as Claire
- Robert Lansing as Howard
- Celeste Holm as Marian
- Robert Alda as Ben
- Scott Hylands as Michael
- Meredith Baxter-Birney as Patricia
- Gail Strickland as Roz
- Richard Masur as Alex
- Denise DeMirjian as Nurse Morrison
- John Friedrich as Josh
- Amanda Gavin as Judy
- Jerome Guardino as Psychiatrist
