= Assignment: Earth =

- Star Trek: The Original Series episode
- Episode no.: Season 2 Episode 26
- Directed by: Marc Daniels
- Story by: Art Wallace; Gene Roddenberry
- Teleplay by: Art Wallace
- Cinematography by: Jerry Finnerman
- Production code: 055
- Original air date: March 29, 1968
- Running time: 50 minutes

Guest appearances
- Robert Lansing as Gary Seven; Teri Garr as Roberta Lincoln; Don Keefer as Mission Control director Cromwell; Morgan Jones as Col. Jack Nesvig; Lincoln Demyan as Sgt. Lipton; Paul Baxley as security chief; Ted Gehring as second policeman; Bruce Mars as first policeman; April Tatro as Isis (Human form) (uncredited); Barbara Babcock as Beta 5 computer voice (uncredited) and Isis's cat vocalizations (uncredited)

Episode chronology
← Previous "Bread and Circuses"	Next → "Spock's Brain"
- Star Trek: The Original Series season 2

"Assignment: Earth" is the twenty-sixth and final episode of the second season of the American science fiction television series Star Trek. Written by Art Wallace (based on a story by Wallace and Gene Roddenberry) and directed by Marc Daniels, it was first broadcast on March 29, 1968.

In the episode, engaged in "historical research", the USS Enterprise travels back through time to 1968 Earth, where they encounter an interstellar agent planning to intervene in 20th-century events. Kirk and Spock are uncertain of his motives.

It was originally written as a standalone half-hour television series; when no network chose to order a pilot, the script was reworked to fit into Star Trek as a backdoor pilot for the proposed Assignment: Earth series. The spin-off series was never produced.

This was Teri Garr's first significant TV role.

== Plot ==
The USS Enterprise, which has travelled through time to 1968 Earth for historical research, intercepts a powerful transporter beam originating from at least one thousand light-years away. A man called Gary Seven (Robert Lansing), dressed in a 20th-century business suit and accompanied by a black cat he calls Isis, materializes on board the Enterprise. Realizing that Captain Kirk and his crew are from the future, Seven warns Kirk that history will be changed if he is not released immediately. Having no proof of Seven's claim, Kirk has him held in the brig. Meanwhile, Spock searches the history database and finds that the United States will launch an orbital nuclear weapons platform in a few hours.

Seven, with the help of his pen-sized "servo" device, escapes and beams down to an office in Manhattan, emerging from a vault door hiding a teleporter. Addressing a voice-activated computer, he identifies himself as "Supervisor 194" (code name Gary Seven) and inquires as to the whereabouts of two agents, "201" and "347", whom he learns have not been heard from in three days. Seven decides to complete their mission himself. A young woman arrives, whom Seven mistakes for Agent 201, but who is actually Roberta Lincoln (Teri Garr), a secretary employed by the missing agents. Seven then tells Roberta he is a CIA agent, and, appealing to her patriotism, asks her to remain and assist him. The computer eventually discovers that Agents 201 and 347 have died in an automobile accident.

Kirk and Spock track Seven to his office. Roberta stalls them while Seven and his cat enter the vault and are teleported away. Arriving at "McKinley Rocket Base", Seven gains access to the gantry and climbs onto an access arm to begin rewiring some circuits of the soon-to-launch rocket. When Kirk and Spock pursue Seven to McKinley Rocket Base, they are immediately detained by police. On the Enterprise, Chief Engineer Scott (James Doohan) locates Seven and initiates beaming him up. At the same moment, in Seven's office, Roberta is experimenting with the vault controls and inadvertently intercepts Scotty's transporter beam, bringing Seven to the office.

Seven takes control of the rocket remotely, arming its warhead and sending it off course. McKinley Base controllers frantically try to regain control and, failing that, send a self-destruct command to the missile, without success. After a failed attempt to call the police, Roberta hits Seven with a heavy cigar box and seizes the servo. Seven pleads with her to allow him to proceed, "...or in six minutes, World War III begins!" Kirk and Spock beam to Seven's office. Seven pleads with Kirk to let him complete his plan, which is to destroy the missile at a low enough altitude to deter the use of such orbital platforms in the future. Kirk tells Spock that if he can't destroy the rocket, he will have to trust Gary Seven. Spock replies that without facts, the decision cannot be made logically. Kirk decides to trust Seven who, with only seconds to spare, safely detonates the warhead at an altitude of 104 miles.

In the epilogue, Spock and Kirk explain to Seven that the Enterprise was meant to be part of the day's events, citing their historical records. Seven is curious to know more, but they reveal only that he and Roberta will have an interesting future.

== Production and reception ==
"Assignment: Earth" is the only original series episode to list the guest star after the episode title, but before the writing credit.

"McKinley Rocket Base" is a fictional location resembling Cape Canaveral Air Force Station, from which much of the stock footage in the episode came. NASA provided Gene Roddenberry with the footage of a Saturn V rocket, with the Apollo 4 capsule, and additional footage shot especially for the episode.

Futurism ranked "Assignment: Earth" as one of the best of what they called "second tier" episodes of the original series.

=== Isis the Cat casting ===
The uncredited human form of the black cat Isis was portrayed by actress, dancer, and contortionist April Tatro. Her identity was unknown until 2019, when The Trek Files podcast cited a production call sheet for extras dated 5 January 1968. Host Larry Nemecek interviewed her for confirmation. Tatro was paid US$84.51 (equivalent to $782 in 2025) for her performance.

Previously, fans had speculated that the briefly seen human form of the cat Isis was portrayed by actress Victoria Vetri. This has been repeated so often that many articles and websites treat it as fact. However, Vetri confirmed that she was not in the episode.

== Other media ==
Characters from the episode have appeared in various non-canonical Star Trek works.

=== Comic books ===
In 2008, IDW Publishing launched an Assignment: Earth five-issue comic book series written and drawn by John Byrne. The stories show the characters' lives from 1968 up to 1974, including Seven and Roberta's peripheral involvement in the events of a prior episode, "Tomorrow Is Yesterday" (occurring before "Assignment: Earth" for the Enterprise crew, but after for Seven and Roberta). An epilogue set in 2008 depicts an annual reunion between Roberta and Isis (in her humanoid guise) at the Vietnam Veterans Memorial to honor a friend who had been killed in that conflict.

In 2010, the characters appeared in issues #3 and #4 of Star Trek: Leonard McCoy Frontier Doctor.

=== Novels ===
Author Greg Cox included Gary Seven and Roberta Lincoln in three of his Star Trek novels: Assignment: Eternity; and a two-part novel, The Eugenics Wars: The Rise and Fall of Khan Noonien Singh. In the latter two novels Seven and Roberta go on to eventually stop Khan Noonien Singh and his fellow genetically engineered humans from taking over the planet.

In the Peter Clines novel Fold, a character comes from an alternate universe with a cat named Isis, after the cat from her favorite TV series, "Assignment Earth". She has no knowledge of the show Star Trek. Her version from this dimension has a cat named Spock.

=== Music ===
The band Five Year Mission has a song based on this episode that imagines the spin-off series was actually produced, and doubles as a theme song for that show.
