= The Enemy Within (Star Trek: The Original Series) =

- Star Trek: The Original Series episode
- Episode no.: Season 1 Episode 5
- Directed by: Leo Penn
- Written by: Richard Matheson
- Cinematography by: Jerry Finnerman
- Production code: 5
- Original air date: October 6, 1966

Guest appearances
- Jim Goodwin – Farrell; Edward Madden – Fisher; Eddie Paskey – Connors; Garland Thompson – Wilson; Don Eitner – photo double for Capt. James Kirk

Episode chronology
| ← Previous "The Naked Time" | Next → "Mudd's Women" |
- Star Trek: The Original Series season 1

"The Enemy Within" is the fifth episode of the first season of the American science fiction television series, Star Trek. Written by Richard Matheson and directed by Leo Penn, it first aired on October 6, 1966.

In the episode, while beaming up from planet Alpha 177 a transporter malfunction causes Captain Kirk to be split into two people, one "good," but indecisive and ineffectual; the other "evil," impulsive and irrational.

== Plot ==
The USS Enterprise is on a geological exploration of the planet Alpha 177. Geological Technician Fisher is injured after a fall and is beamed back aboard Enterprise, though Chief Engineer Scott has some trouble with the transporter. The transporter equipment appears to be fine but he notices some magnetic dust from ore samples covering Fisher's uniform that may have interfered with the transport.

Captain Kirk transports back to the ship. The transporter appears to work correctly, but Kirk experiences some disorientation, and Scott escorts Kirk out of the transporter room. While unsupervised, the transporter activates a second time, materializing a second version of Kirk which behaves maliciously, unlike his counterpart. This "evil" Kirk begins to wander the ship, and those he encounters are confused by his behavior.

Scott assists in beaming a dog-like animal specimen from the planet, but two identical creatures materialize (the "good" one then the "evil" one, like Kirk) – one completely docile and the other vicious. Scott surmises that the ore dust has caused the transporter to split the personalities of those they beamed up, creating good and evil counterparts. Scott reports this to Mr. Spock and then orders the transporter taken out of service to investigate, stranding the landing party on the planet as the bitterly cold night sets in. Elsewhere on the ship, the "good" Kirk begins to feel uncertain, and struggles to make decisions. The "evil" Kirk, in a drunken state, assaults Yeoman Janice Rand in her quarters. She scratches his face with her fingernails. When Fisher witnesses this and calls security, the "evil" Kirk attacks and knocks him out. Rand reports the incident to the bridge. The "good" Kirk orders the crew to capture the "evil" Kirk, but at Spock's advice he keeps the fact that their quarry is his evil half a secret so as not to weaken the crew's faith in him; the crew is instead told of an imposter recognizable by the scratches on his cheek.

The "evil" Kirk hears this announcement and uses makeup to mask his injury. He secures a phaser from a security officer, before going into hiding in Engineering. Putting himself in his shoes, the "good" Kirk anticipates this move. While the two Kirks face off, Spock disables the "evil" Kirk with a Vulcan nerve pinch. Spock and McCoy realize that both Kirks are mentally deteriorating, and they must find a way to reverse the transporter accident to save them, as well as the landing party. Spock and Scott use power from the ship's impulse drive to reverse the transporter on the dog-like specimen. When it materializes, the creature is whole but dead. Spock suggests that it died because its animal brain could not handle the stress of its two halves being reintegrated, so Kirk will be able to survive the same procedure, while Dr. Leonard McCoy insists they can't take the risk that the death was caused by ongoing transporter malfunction.

With the landing party nearly dead from hypothermia, the "good" Kirk opts to gamble on the procedure rather than wait for an autopsy on the creature. When he releases the "evil" Kirk, his other self overpowers him, and gives him facial scratches like his own. Pretending to be the "good" Kirk, he tells Rand the truth about the "imposter", and offers the chance to elaborate before heading to the bridge. He orders the crew to leave orbit, telling the navigator that the landing party cannot be saved. The "good" Kirk and McCoy race to the bridge, where the two Kirks face off. The "good" Kirk at last persuades the "evil" Kirk that they need each other to survive, and will both live on as parts of each other. He orders Scott to attempt the reversal process, and Kirk is rejoined as one being. With his sense of command and good will restored (and the transporter repaired), Kirk orders the landing party beamed up. They are safe despite the cold. Rand tells Kirk about her last encounter with "evil" Kirk, but he cuts her off before she can discuss the issue further. Spock jokes to Rand, suggesting that there might be something she found attractive about "evil" Kirk.

== Production ==
The episode's writer, Richard Matheson, was inspired by Dr Jekyll and Mr Hyde, Robert Louis Stevenson's character who is struggling with his evil alter ego.

The subplot of four crewmembers stranded on the planet in freezing temperatures was added later as a re-write. Matheson opposed the idea as he thought B-stories slowed stories down. He said, "They added a whole subplot about people down on the planet, ready to freeze to death, because they have a transporter functioning problem...I stuck entirely with Bill."

Leonard Nimoy, unhappy with part of the script that called for Spock to hit "evil" Kirk on the head with a phaser to render him unconscious, suggested the idea of the Vulcan nerve pinch. Director Leo Penn had a difficult time understanding the idea, but William Shatner helped demonstrate Nimoy's concept.

This episode is one of the small group for which a full score was written, in this case by Sol Kaplan. Jeff Bond noted:

Although he wrote only two scores for the series, New York composer Sol Kaplan's music was tracked endlessly throughout the show's first two seasons. ... 'The Enemy Within' is a thrillingly intellectual score, by turns overcome with compassion for Kirk's plight and clinically detached in its melodic experimentation with the situation... [T]he aggressive, threatening 'evil Kirk' music made major contributions by being tracked into other episodes.

== Reception ==
Zack Handlen of The A.V. Club gave the episode an 'A−' rating, noting that while the last act of the episode was somewhat redundant, the first two run smoothly, and describing Shatner's acting as Kirk's good half as "very solid stuff."

In 2014, IO9 rated "The Enemy Within" the 81st greatest episode of Star Trek. In 2016, IGN ranked "The Enemy Within" the 7th best episode of the original series.

In 2016, Empire ranked this the 15th best out of the top 50 episodes of all the 700 plus Star Trek television episodes.

In 2016, Radio Times ranked the moment where the "evil" Kirk exclaims "I'm Captain Kirk!!", the tenth best moment of all Star Trek film and television up to that time. They felt that Shatner's acting performance "completely carries this early first season episode."

In 2017, Fatherly ranked this episode as one of the top 10 episodes for kids to watch.

In 2018, PopMatters ranked this the 8th best episode of the original series. They praised Shatner (who plays both Kirks) for his nuanced yet over-the-top performance, depicting an extraordinary range of emotions.

A 2018 Star Trek binge-watching guide by Den of Geek, recommended this episode as one of the best of the original series.

In 2019, Nerdist included this episode on their "Best of Kirk" binge-watching guide.

In 2019, Comic Book Resources ranked this episode as one of the top 8 most memorable episodes of the original Star Trek.
