= Loose Ends (novel) =

2001 novel by Greg Cox

- Author: Greg Cox
- Language: English
- Series: Roswell
- Genre: Science fiction novel
- Publisher: Pocket Books
- Publication date: 4 June 2001
- Publication place: United States
- Media type: Print (paperback)
- Pages: 288 pp (first edition, paperback)
- ISBN: 978-0-7434-1834-8 (first edition, paperback)
- OCLC: 47911770
- LC Class: CPB Box no. 1759 vol. 16
- Followed by: No Good Deed

Loose Ends (2001) is the first original novel based on the Roswell TV series.

== Reception ==
Don D'Amassa said in his review for Science Fiction Chronicle that "Cox does a craftsman like job of elaborating this minor theme and turning it into a reasonably good adventure."
