= Robert Lansing (actor) =

American actor (1928–1994)

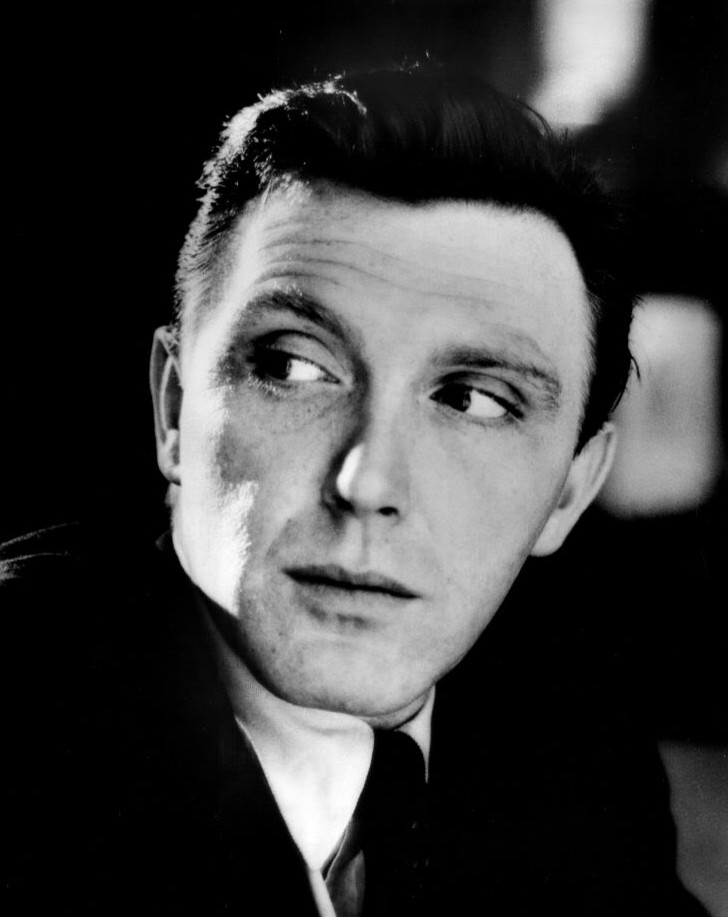
- Lansing in 1962
- Born: Robert Howell Brown; June 5, 1928; San Diego, California, U.S.
- Died: October 23, 1994 (aged 66); New York City, U.S.
- Resting place: Union Field Cemetery, Congregation Rodeph Sholom in Ridgewood, Queens, New York City
- Occupation: Actor
- Spouses: Emily McLaughlin (m. 1956; div. 1968) Gari Hardy Anderson (m. 1969; div. 1971) Anne Pivar (m. 1981)
- Children: 2

Robert Lansing (/ˈlænsɪŋ/; born Robert Howell Brown, June 5, 1928 – October 23, 1994) was an American stage, film, and television actor.

Lansing is probably best remembered as the authoritarian Brigadier General Frank Savage in 12 O'Clock High (1964), the television drama series about American bomber pilots during World War II. During his career, which spanned five decades, Lansing appeared in 245 episodes of 73 television series, 11 TV movies, and 19 motion pictures. His other notable television roles included 87th Precinct (1961–62), the Star Trek episode "Assignment: Earth" (1968), Automan (1983–1984), and The Equalizer (1985–1989).

== Early life ==
Lansing was born in 1928 in San Diego and while living in Los Angeles, California, he attended University High School. As a young actor in New York City, he was hired to join a stock company in Michigan, but was told he would first have to join the Actors' Equity Association. Equity would not allow him to join using his birth name of "Robert Brown" because another actor was using that name. Because the stock company was based in Lansing, this became the actor's new surname.

Lansing served two years in the U.S. Army and was stationed in Osaka, Japan, where he worked at Armed Forces Radio.

== Career ==
=== Early roles ===
During the late 1940s and early 1950s, he worked under his real name, Bob Brown, as a radio announcer at WANE in Fort Wayne, Indiana. He also was active as an actor in a Fort Wayne theater group. Lansing first appeared on Broadway in the play Stalag 17 (1951) directed by José Ferrer, replacing Mark Roberts in the role of Dunbar at the 48th Street Theater. He gained early acting experience at the Actors Studio.

=== Stage ===
His rugged good looks, commanding stage presence, and stentorian voice earned him continuing stage work and throughout his film career, he periodically returned to the New York stage, making his last such appearance in 1991.

He played the lead in the 1973 Roundabout Theater production of August Strindberg's The Father, staged by Gene Feist. New York Times critic Clive Barnes praised Lansing's "mannered, tortured, and racked portrait of the Captain" as "superlative," comparing it favorably with a Michael Redgrave performance years earlier. Also that year he starred with Barbara Bel Geddes in the Broadway production of Jean Kerr's comedy Finishing Touches. In 1977, Lansing appeared in a one-man show as coal miner union leader John L. Lewis.

Lansing appeared in Tennessee Williams' Suddenly, Last Summer and Eugene O'Neill's The Great God Brown in the title role. His other stage performances included roles in Charley's Aunt, Elmer Rice's Cue for Passion, The Lovers, and The Cut of the Axe. Off-Broadway, his work included The Father, the "Sea Plays" of Eugene O'Neill, and two one-man shows, Damien and The Disciple of Discontent.

In 1989, Lansing appeared at the Williamstown Theatre Festival in a dramatization of John Brown's Body. The three-person cast also included Christopher Reeve and Laurie Kennedy.

=== Film ===
On film, Lansing starred in the 1959 science-fiction film 4D Man. He also starred as marine biologist Hank Donner in the 1966 nature drama film Namu, the Killer Whale. His other films included Under the Yum Yum Tree, A Gathering of Eagles, The Grissom Gang, Bittersweet Love, False Face, Empire of the Ants, and The Nest.

=== Television ===
Lansing first appeared on TV on Kraft Television Theatre in 1956. In the 1961–1962 television season, Lansing was cast as Detective Steve Carella on NBC's 87th Precinct series, based on the Ed McBain detective novels. His costars were Gena Rowlands, Ron Harper, Gregory Walcott, and Norman Fell. Also in 1961, he played Jed Trask, a troubled shooter, in the Bonanza episode, "Cutthroat Junction". He guest-starred in two other episodes of the NBC's Western series: "Danger Road" (1970) as Gunny O'Riley and "Heritage of Anger" (1972) as John Dundee. He played Doc Holliday in an episode of NBC's The Tall Man, with Barry Sullivan and Clu Gulager. Lansing starred alongside Clu Gulager again in a 1965 episode of NBC's The Virginian TV series titled "The Brothers". Again on NBC, in 1966, Lansing guest-starred as General Custer in a three-episode segment of Branded called "Call to Glory".

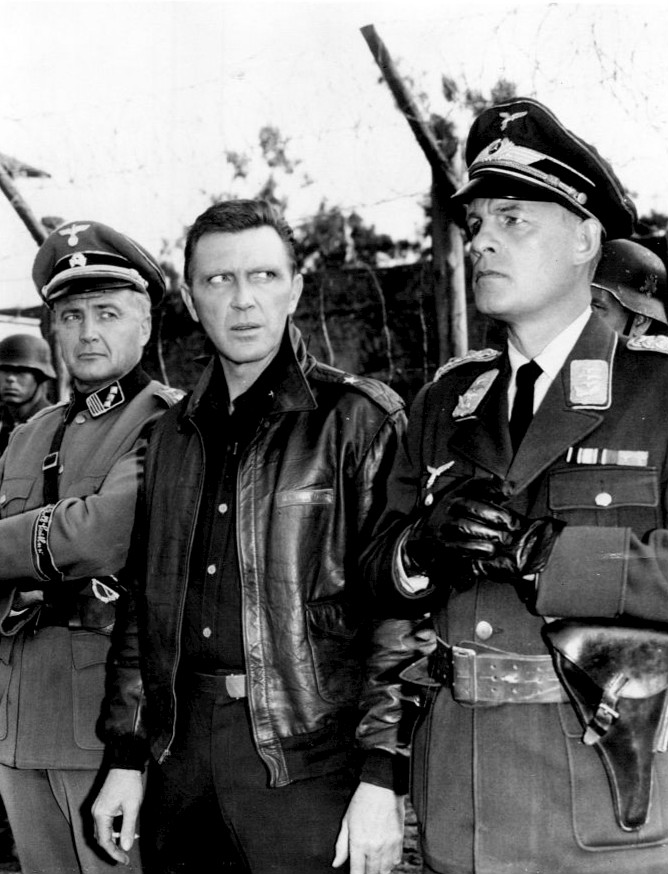
John van Dreelen, Lansing, and Alf Kjellin in 12 O'Clock High (1965)

Robert Lansing is probably best known for his role as Brigadier General Frank Savage in the first season of the Quinn Martin production 12 O'Clock High, which aired on the ABC Television Network from 1964 to 1967.

His other television roles include portrayals of an alcoholic college professor in ABC's drama Channing, as Gil Green in the 1963 episode "Fear Begins at Forty" on the NBC medical drama The Eleventh Hour, as a bounty hunter on Gunsmoke, and as a parole officer in a 1968 episode ("A Time to Love — A Time to Cry") of The Mod Squad.

He was the interstellar secret agent Gary Seven in a Star Trek episode ("Assignment: Earth", 1968), which also featured Teri Garr, and was originally intended as a backdoor pilot for an unsold new series.

Lansing played an international secret agent in The Man Who Never Was, and Lt. Jack Curtis on Automan. He also played a recurring role, known only as "Control", on 29 episodes of The Equalizer between 1985 and 1989, which then was spun-off into the TV movie Memories of Manon, which aired on February 13, 1989. He guest-starred in The Twilight Zone episode "The Long Morrow" and in the Thriller episode "Fatal Impulse". He also guest-starred on other television productions such as NBC's Law & Order.

In the 1980s, he did a series of television commercials for Liberty National Bank in Louisville, Kentucky, and for the popular supermarket chain Giant Eagle.

Lansing's final television role was that of Police Captain Paul Blaisdell on the series Kung Fu: The Legend Continues. The role was written specifically for Lansing by series writer and executive producer Michael Sloan, who had worked with Lansing on the series The Equalizer in the 1980s, although Lansing had already been diagnosed with cancer. Despite continuing health problems, Lansing performed in 24 episodes in the first and second seasons. In the final episode of season two, titled "Retribution", Lansing's character of Blaisdell was written out, with the possibility of the character returning if the actor's health improved. The episode, filmed in February 1994, was Lansing's final acting performance. It aired on November 28, 1994, a month after the actor died, and was dedicated to his memory.

== Personal life and death ==
Lansing had a son, Robert Frederick Orin Lansing, with his first wife, actress Emily McLaughlin whom he married in 1956; they divorced in 1968. The following year, Lansing married Gari Hardy, but this marriage also ended in divorce. The couple had a daughter, Alice Lucille Lansing. His last marriage was to Anne Pivar, with whom he remained until his death in 1994. From 1991 to 1993, he was president of The Players Club, a theatrical fraternal organization founded by Edwin Booth in 1888.

A long-time smoker, Lansing died in a Bronx, New York, hospice while undergoing treatment for lung cancer. He was 66.

His funeral was at Congregation Rodeph Shalom in Manhattan, after which he was buried at Union Field Cemetery in Ridgewood, Queens.

== Filmography ==
=== Film roles ===
- 4D Man (1959) as Dr. Scott Nelson
- The Pusher (1960) as Steve Carella
- A Gathering of Eagles (1963) as Sergeant Banning
- Under the Yum Yum Tree (1963) as Charles Howard
- Namu, the Killer Whale (1966) as Hank Donner
- An Eye for an Eye (1966) as Talion
- It Takes All Kinds (1969) as Tony Gunther
- The Grissom Gang (1971) as Dave Fenner
- The Astronaut (1972) as John Phillips
- Wild in the Sky (1972) as Major Reason
- Thirty Dangerous Seconds (1973) as Glenn Raven
- Acapulco Gold (1976) as Carl Solborg
- Bittersweet Love (1976) as Howard
- Scalpel (a.k.a. False Face) (1977) as Dr. Philip Reynolds
- Empire of the Ants (1977) as Dan Stokely
- S*H*E (1980) as Owen Hooper
- Island Claws (1980) as Moody
- The Nest (1988) as Elias Johnson
- After School (1988) as C.A. Thomas

=== Stage roles ===
- Stalag 17 (1951) as Dunbar (replacement)
- Cyrano de Bergerac (1953) as Cadet of Gascoyne
- Richard III (1953) as Marquis of Dorset
- Charley's Aunt (1953) as Jack Chesney
- The Lovers (1956) as Herstal de la Crux
- Cue for Passion (1958) as Lloyd Hilton
- Suddenly, Last Summer (1958) as Dr. Cukrowicz
- The Great God Brown (1959) as William A. Brown
- All About Love (1959)
- Cut of the Axe (1960) as Paul Carr
- Under the Yum Yum Tree (1960)
- Antony and Cleopatra (1967)
- Brightower (1970) as Daniel Brightower
- Finishing Touches (1973) as Jeff Cooper
- The Father (1973) as The Captain
- The Line (1977)
- Phaedra (1977)
- SS Glencairn (1977–1978)
- The Dance of Death (1980–1981)
- Damien (1981)
- The Little Foxes (1981) as Benjamin Hubbard (replacement)
- The Bathers (1983–1984)
- The Cost of Living (1985)
- John Brown's Body (1989)
- Mi Vida Loca (1990) as Ajay
- The Sum of Us (1990) as Dad (replacement)

=== TV film roles ===
- Calhoun: County Agent (1964, TV movie) as Eric Sloane
- The Long Hunt of April Savage (1966, TV movie) as April Savage
- The Astronaut (1972, TV movie) as John Phillips
- Killer by Night (1972, TV movie) as Warren Claman
- Crime Club (1975, TV movie) as Alex Norton
- Widow (1976, TV movie) as Harold
- The Deadly Triangle (1977, TV movie) as Charles Cole
- Life on the Mississippi (1980, Nebraska Public Television Movie) as Horace Bixby
- Shadow of Sam Penny (1983, TV movie) as Sam Penny
- Memories of Manon (1988, TV movie) as "Control"
- Bionic Showdown: The Six Million Dollar Man and the Bionic Woman (1989, TV movie) as General McAllister
- Submarine: Steel Boats, Iron Men (1989, TV movie) as Narrator

=== Television series ===
- Kraft Television Theatre (1947–1958)
- The Big Story (1949–1958)
- Armstrong Circle Theatre (1950–1963)
- General Electric Theater (1953–1962)
- The United States Steel Hour (1953–1963)
- Gunsmoke (1955–1975)
- Camera Three (1955–1979)
- Wagon Train (1957–1965)
- Young Doctor Malone (1958–1963)
- The Further Adventures of Ellery Queen (1958–1959)
- The Twilight Zone (1959–1964)
- Bonanza (1959–1973)
- Alcoa Presents: One Step Beyond (1959–1961)
- Deadline (1959–1961)
- Thriller (1960–1962)
- The Tall Man (1960–1962)
- Checkmate (1960–1962)
- Insight (1960–1984)
- Outlaws (1960–1962)
- Michael Shayne (1960–1961)
- Here's Hollywood (1960–1962)
- Moment of Fear (1960)
- Dow Hour of Great Mysteries (1960)
- The Mike Douglas Show (1961–1982)
- 87th Precinct (1961–1962)
- The DuPont Show of the Week (1961–1964)
- The Virginian (1962–1971)
- The Tonight Show Starring Johnny Carson (1962–1992)
- Saints and Sinners (1962–1963)
- The Eleventh Hour (1962–1964)
- Sam Benedict (1962–1963)
- Temple Houston (1963–1964)
- Channing (a.k.a. the Young and the Bold) (1963–1964)
- You Don't Say! (1963–1975)
- Daniel Boone (1964–1970)
- Twelve O'Clock High (1964–1967)
- Slattery's People (1964–1965)
- Branded (1965–1966)
- The Loner (1965–1966)
- The American Sportsman (1965–1986)
- Star Trek (1966–1969)
- The Monroes (1966–1967)
- Dream Girl of '67 (1966–1967)
- The Man Who Never Was (1966–1967)
- Mannix (1967–1975)
- Ironside (1967–1975)
- The High Chaparral (1967–1971)
- The Flying Nun (1967–1970)
- Cimarron Strip (1967–1968)
- Dateline: Hollywood (1967– )
- The Mod Squad (1968–1973)
- The Doris Day Show (1968–1973)
- The Name of the Game (1968–1971)
- Journey to the Unknown (1968–1969 )
- Marcus Welby, M.D. (1969–1976)
- Medical Center (1969–1976)
- It Takes Two (1969–1970)
- The Interns (1970–1971)
- The Virginia Graham Show (1970–1972)
- Great Performances (1972– )
- Celebrity Bowling (1971–1977)
- The Rookies (1972–1976)
- The Evil Touch (1973–1974)
- Simon & Simon (1981–1995)
- Hotel (1983–1988)
- Automan (1983–1984)
- Murder, She Wrote (1984–1996)
- The Equalizer (1985–1989)
- Alfred Hitchcock Presents (1985–1989)
- American Experience (1988– )
- Monsters (1988–1990)
- Against the Law (1990–1991)
- Kung Fu: The Legend Continues (1993–1994)
- Law & Order (1991) as COO Peter O'Farrell
