= Tomorrow Is Yesterday =

- Star Trek: The Original Series episode
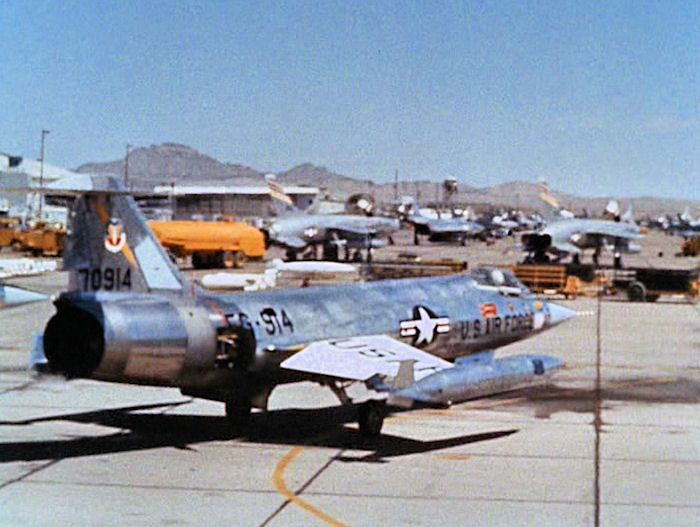
- Screenshot from the show's opening teaser of an F-104C Starfighter
- Episode no.: Season 1 Episode 19
- Directed by: Michael O'Herlihy
- Written by: D. C. Fontana
- Cinematography by: Jerry Finnerman
- Production code: 021
- Original air date: January 26, 1967

Guest appearances
- Roger Perry – USAF Captain John Christopher; Hal Lynch – USAF Air Police Sergeant; Richard Merrifield – Technician; John Winston – Transporter Chief Kyle; Ed Peck – USAF Air Police Col. Fellini; Mark Dempsey – Air Force Captain; Jim Spencer – USAF Air Policeman; Sherri Townsend – Crew Woman

Episode chronology
← Previous "Arena"	Next → "Court Martial"
- Star Trek: The Original Series season 1

"Tomorrow Is Yesterday" is the nineteenth episode of the first season of the American science fiction television series Star Trek. Written by D. C. Fontana and directed by Michael O'Herlihy, it first aired on January 26, 1967. It was the first Star Trek episode to be written solely by a woman (Fontana had previously written the teleplay for the episode “Charlie X” but the story was credited to Gene Roddenberry).

In the episode, the Enterprise is sent back in time to Earth in the 1960s, where the US Air Force detects it. The crew must correct the damage to the timeline and find a way to travel back to the future.

== Plot ==
The USS Enterprise is accidentally sent back in time to Earth during the 1960s by the effects of a high-gravity "black star". Enterprise appears in Earth's upper atmosphere and is detected by military radar.

When the Enterprise is labeled a UFO, a U.S. Air Force F-104 interceptor, piloted by Captain John Christopher, is scrambled to identify the craft. Fearing the fighter may be carrying nuclear weapons, Captain Kirk orders a tractor beam to be used on the jet, which causes it to break apart. To save the life of the pilot, they beam Christopher aboard the Enterprise.

Fearing Christopher could disrupt the timeline if returned to Earth, Kirk at first decides that the pilot must stay with the Enterprise. When Science Officer Spock later discovers that the pilot's as-yet-unborn son will play an important role in a future mission to Saturn, Kirk realizes he must return Christopher to Earth after all.

After learning of the existence of film taken of the Enterprise by Christopher's wing cameras, Kirk and Lt. Sulu beam down to the airbase to recover the film and any other evidence of their visit. They are caught by an Air Policeman, who accidentally activates an emergency signal on Kirk's communicator and is beamed aboard. Kirk and Sulu continue their search, after which Kirk is captured again and Sulu escapes.

Spock, Sulu, and Christopher, who knows the base's layout, beam down to recover Kirk. After Kirk's guards are subdued, Christopher takes one of their guns and demands to be left behind. Spock, having anticipated Christopher would make such an attempt, appears behind Christopher and disables him with a Vulcan nerve pinch.

After they return to the ship, Spock and Chief Engineer Scott inform Kirk of a possible escape method by slingshotting around the Sun to break away and return to their time. The maneuver is risky, since even a small miscalculation could destroy the ship, or make them miss their own era.

Kirk approves the maneuver. Enterprise begins the maneuver and time on board begins to move backwards. Christopher is beamed back to his fighter jet at the instant he first encountered the Enterprise, preventing any film evidence of the ship being produced, and erasing his memory of his time on the Enterprise. The same is done with the Air Policeman. Enterprise then successfully returns to the 23rd century.

== Production ==
The episode was originally conceived as part two to an earlier episode, "The Naked Time"; when the ending to that episode was revised, "Tomorrow Is Yesterday" was reworked as a stand-alone story. Associate producer Robert H. Justman devised the original idea for the story, and it was handed to Dorothy Fontana to create a teleplay. Justman received neither credit nor payment for doing so, whereas Roddenberry's agent charged the studio up to $3,000 for his own stories and rewrites.

== Reference in further Star Trek stories ==
The method of time travel in this episode was used subsequently to send the Enterprise back to the year 1968 in the second season episode "Assignment: Earth." It is presumed the same technique was used to return the ship to her proper time after the episode ended.

The second issue of IDW Publishing's comic book series Assignment: Earth (a continuation of the episode of the same name, drawing on the episode's status as a failed backdoor pilot for a spin-off television series) shows the protagonists, Gary Seven and his assistant Roberta Lincoln, becoming peripherally involved in the events of "Tomorrow Is Yesterday", acting on their own to prevent the Enterprise's presence from affecting history. Due to peculiarities of time travel, the Enterprise crewmembers have not yet met Seven and Lincoln at this point, but it is Seven's and Lincoln's second encounter with them (though they are careful to avoid direct contact, so as not to alter the proper course of events).

The "slingshot maneuver" was employed a third time by the crew in the motion picture Star Trek IV: The Voyage Home, this time to travel back to the year 1986, and then again to return the Klingon Bird of Prey, renamed Bounty, which the command crew had captured at the end of Star Trek III: The Search for Spock, to 2286.

Picard notes in "Penance", the twelfth episode of Star Trek: Picard, that "Kirk's Enterprise" used the method multiple times, and proposed doing the same, in order to restore their timeline. Responding to the objection that Kirk was able to succeed only because he had Spock to perform the calculations, Jurati struck a deal for the services of the captive Borg Queen who was just as eager to set the timeline aright. The Borg Queen, Admiral Picard, and his crew, flew La Sirena back to 2024 in the following episode, "Assimilation".

The Star Trek Star Fleet Technical Manual is described, in two forewords to the manual proper, as having had its contents accidentally downloaded into the main computer of a United States Air Force facility located in Omaha during the accidental time trip the Enterprise took in "Tomorrow Is Yesterday"—specifically Offutt Air Force Base, headquarters of the Strategic Air Command, referred to as the Omaha Installation in the script.

== Reception ==
In 2009, Tor.com rated it 5 out 6, noting that it depicted a sort of "hope and optimism and excitement about the new frontier" at a time before the first lunar landing mission. The day after the first airing of this episode saw the Apollo 1 disaster.

Zack Handlen of The A.V. Club gave the episode a 'B−' rating, describing it as "so-so" and "passable".

SyFy ranked "Tomorrow Is Yesterday" as the 11th best time travel plot in Star Trek, in 2016.

In 2018, CBR ranked this one of the top-twenty time travel themed episodes of all Star Trek series.

In 2018, BuzzFeed listed this as example of an episode of a TV series that would serve as a better introduction to the series than the pilot. They point out that the franchise can be overwhelming to newcomers, and praised this episode as "beautiful, witty, and really makes you think".

In 2019, Nerdist ranked "Tomorrow Is Yesterday" the sixth best time travel episode of all Star Trek.
