= Pavel Chekov =

Fictional character in the Star Trek universe

- Star Trek character
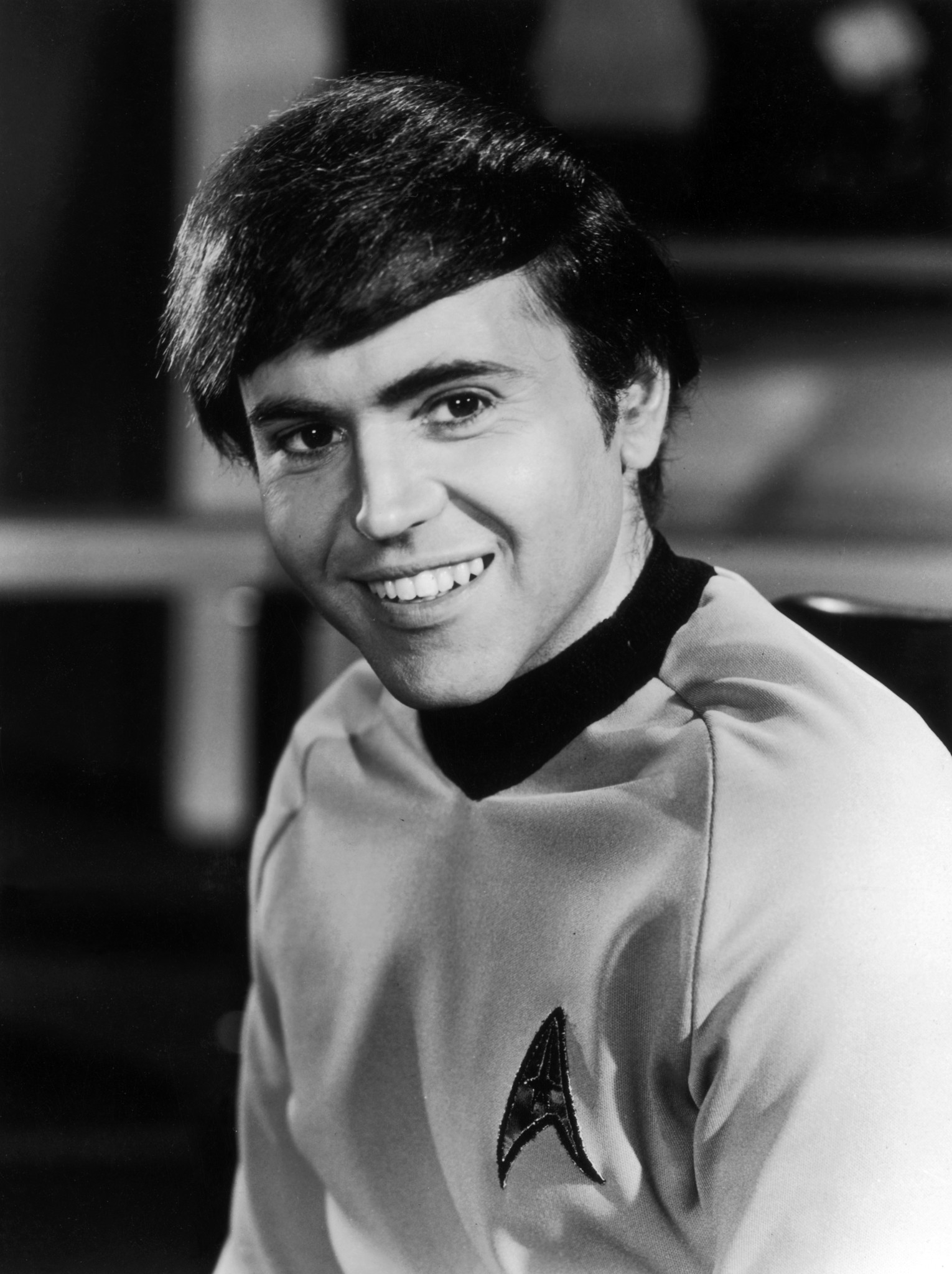
- Walter Koenig as Pavel Andreievich Chekov
- First appearance: "Amok Time"; Star Trek; September 15, 1967
- Last appearance: Star Trek Beyond; July 7, 2016
- Created by: Gene Roddenberry
- Portrayed by: Walter Koenig (1967–1994); Anton Yelchin (2009–2016)

In-universe information
- Full name: Pavel Andreievich Chekov
- Species: Human
- Gender: Male
- Affiliation: United Federation of Planets; Starfleet
- Children: Anton Chekov (son)
- Planet: Earth
- Posting: USS Enterprise – Navigator, Security/Tactical Officer; USS Reliant – First Officer; USS Enterprise-A – Navigator and First Officer
- Rank: Ensign (The Original Series); Lieutenant (The Motion Picture); Commander (STII – Generations)

Pavel Andreievich Chekov (Russian: Павел Андреевич Чеков) is a fictional character in the Star Trek universe.

Walter Koenig portrayed Chekov in the second and third seasons of the original Star Trek series and the first seven Star Trek films. Anton Yelchin portrayed the character in the 2009 Star Trek reboot film and two sequels, Star Trek Into Darkness and Star Trek Beyond. Both Koenig and Yelchin were born to Russian parents, but grew up in the United States, and both affected Russian accents for their roles.

== Origin ==
Star Trek creator Gene Roddenberry wanted to include a younger cast member to appeal to teenage audiences. With a second season of Star Trek to be produced, Roddenberry interviewed Walter Koenig on the recommendation of director Joseph Pevney. After casting Koenig, Roddenberry wrote a letter to Mikhail Zimyanin, editor of Pravda, informing him of the introduction of a Russian character, and an NBC press release announcing the character at the time stated that it was in response to a Pravda article, condemning the show for having no Russian characters. The existence of such a Pravda article is disputed. Roddenberry also acknowledged that the character was in response to the popularity of The Monkees' Davy Jones. Koenig always denied the "Russian origin" story and affirmed that his character was added in response to the popularity of The Monkees, and the character's hairstyle and appearance are a direct reference to this. Roddenberry had previously mentioned, in a memo to his casting director, a desire to have someone reminiscent of one of The Beatles or Monkees on the show.

Koenig's modest height, eyes, thick eyebrows, boyish face, and smile were all strikingly evocative of the lone British "Monkee" who captivated millions of pre-teen girls. Early attempts were made to style Koenig's brown hair similar to that of Jones too. Wigs were used in a couple of early episodes but not in others, which reveals a stage of experimentation to attentive viewers. Eventually, a final look for Koenig's hair length and fullness was reached and used consistently thereafter.

After Paramount Television signed Koenig to a contract because of the number of fan letters he received as Chekov, Roddenberry wrote in another memo "Kirk and Spock and the others actually seem rather 'middle aged' to the large youthful segment of our audience. We badly need a young man aboard the Enterprise—we need youthful attitudes and perspectives. Chekov can be used potently here". In actuality, Koenig was only five years younger than co-stars Leonard Nimoy and William Shatner.

The episode "Amok Time", which was the first episode broadcast during the second season, was Chekov's first television appearance ("Catspaw", the first episode shot with the Chekov character, would be broadcast a month later to roughly coincide with Halloween). Because of budgetary constraints, the character did not appear in the animated Star Trek.

== Character biography ==
Pavel Andreievich Chekov was born in 2245 and is a young and naïve ensign who first appears on-screen in the original series’ second season as the Enterprise's navigator. According to Roddenberry, he is "an extraordinarily capable young man—almost Spock's equal in some areas. An honor graduate of the Space Academy." Chekov also substitutes for Mr. Spock at the science officer station when necessary. His promotion to lieutenant for Star Trek: The Motion Picture brings with it his transfer as the ship's tactical officer and chief of security. During his tour of Duty on the Enterprise, Chekov lost his mind on three occasions: in "Day of the Dove" Chekov was implanted with false memories and driven to violence by a non-corporeal alien entity; in "And the Children Shall Lead", Chekov was exposed to mind control by a group of children who had been given powers by a non-corporeal being; and in "The Tholian Web" Chekov became violently insane following exposure to interspace. Furthermore, in the film Star Trek II: The Wrath of Khan, Chekov was subject to mind control after being implanted with a juvenile Ceti eel. A running gag on Star Trek is that whenever Chekov gets into personal combat with opponents stronger than he, he loses the fight: "The Trouble with Tribbles" with Klingons or "The Gamesters of Triskelion" with the gladiator-like slaves/thralls. In "Spectre of the Gun" he is shot and killed in the fantasy but survives only because he was thinking of a beautiful fantasy woman. He also likes the beautiful female androids in "I, Mudd".

By the events of Star Trek II: The Wrath of Khan, Chekov is executive officer aboard the USS Reliant. In that film, Khan Noonien Singh uses a creature that wraps itself around Chekov's cerebral cortex to control him and his captain. Chekov overcomes the creature's mind control and serves as Enterprise tactical officer in the film's climactic battle.

A common myth about Star Trek is that Khan recognizing Chekov in the film is a continuity error because "Space Seed", with the villain, was broadcast before Koenig's casting. Adaptations: From Text to Screen, Screen to Text calls this "the apparent gaffe notorious throughout Star Trek fandom". Although Chekov does not appear in "Space Seed", "Catspaw"—with the character—has an earlier stardate. Koenig joked that Khan remembers Chekov from the episode after he takes too long in a restroom Khan wants to use.

Chekov is an accomplice in Kirk's theft of the Enterprise to rescue Spock in Star Trek III: The Search for Spock, but is exonerated in Star Trek IV: The Voyage Home. He serves as navigator aboard the Enterprise-A during the events of Star Trek V: The Final Frontier and Star Trek VI: The Undiscovered Country. The character's final film appearance is as a guest aboard the Enterprise-B on its maiden voyage in Star Trek Generations. Chekov is mentioned as being deceased in the series finale of Star Trek: Picard, in a broadcast by his son Anton, the president of the Federation, who is voiced by Koenig in his final Star Trek role. Koenig insisted that the character be named Anton as a tribute to Anton Yelchin, who succeeded him as Chekov in the J. J. Abrams reboot films.

Spinoff novels show a continued career path, but these are not considered canon in the Star Trek universe. Novels written by William Shatner detail that Chekov reaches the rank of admiral, and even serves as Commander in Chief of Starfleet.

=== Reboot films ===
Anton Yelchin as Pavel Chekov

The 2009 Star Trek film creates an alternate timeline in the franchise. In this timeline, Anton Yelchin's portrayal presents Chekov as a 17-year-old prodigy whose mathematical ability proves instrumental in a few events within the film. In the sequel, Star Trek Into Darkness, Chekov finds himself promoted to chief engineer after Scotty resigns. When Kirk orders him to put on a red shirt, a brief sting is heard as a closeup shows Chekov's nervous face, playing on the reputation of redshirts in the franchise as much as the character's shock regarding his sudden promotion.

The third film, Star Trek Beyond, was Yelchin's final appearance as Chekov, the film seeing Chekov accompanying Kirk after the entire crew is marooned on an uncharted planet following the destruction of the Enterprise, forcing them to destroy the last of the Enterprise to escape a trap and later work with the rest of the senior staff to restart a long-lost Starfleet ship to escape the planet and defeat a plan to attack the Federation.

==== Anton Yelchin's death ====
Yelchin was crushed to death by his 2016 Jeep Grand Cherokee on June 19, 2016, a little more than a month before the scheduled release of Star Trek Beyond on July 22, 2016. All filming had been completed and post-production had started. A dedication to Yelchin's memory was inserted into the credits. J. J. Abrams, producer of the reboot trilogy and director of its first two films, had stated that the role would not be recast for future sequels, implying the character of Chekov would be written out in future films. However, following the merger of Skydance Media and Paramount Global, Paramount Skydance ultimately scrapped the fourth film altogether in November 2025.

== Fan productions ==
Walter Koenig reprised his role as Chekov 12 years after Star Trek Generations in the fan-created series New Voyages episode "To Serve All My Days". Andy Bray portrayed a younger Chekov in that episode. Koenig reprised the character again in Star Trek: Renegades as 143-year-old Admiral Chekov, the newly appointed head of Section 31. He has stated that should there be a sequel, he would reprise Chekov and then retire from the role. He also returned as Chekov in the online miniseries Star Trek: Of Gods and Men.

In scientific illustrator Jenny Parks' 2017 book Star Trek Cats, Chekov is depicted as a Russian Blue.

== Reception ==
In 2018, The Wrap placed Chekov as 21st out 39 in a ranking of main cast characters of the Star Trek franchise prior to Star Trek: Discovery. In 2016, Chekov was ranked as the 30th most important character of Starfleet within the Star Trek science fiction universe by Wired magazine, out of 100 characters.

In 2018, Comic Book Resources ranked Chekov the 22nd best member of Starfleet.
