= Gary Seven =

Fictional character in the Star Trek series

- Star Trek character
- Portrayed by: Robert Lansing

In-universe information
- Species: Human
- Title: Supervisor

Gary Seven is the major character in the last episode of the second season of the original Star Trek television series, "Assignment: Earth". He is portrayed by Robert Lansing. He has subsequently appeared in further Star Trek media.

== "Assignment: Earth" ==
The episode "Assignment: Earth" was originally a television pilot for a proposed series about Gary Seven, who, according to "Assignment: Earth”, is a human from the 24th century undertaking a mission on Earth in 1968, "the only Earth man to survive the transit." His goal in the original series pilot would have been to defeat the Omegans, a race of shape-changing aliens who have sent agents back in time to change Earth's history so they can defeat Earth in the future.

The pilot was later reworked as an episode for Star Trek, where Seven is now a human raised on a distant planet.

== Powers and abilities ==
Although Seven is human, he manifests at least one non-human feature namely, he is immune to the impact of the Vulcan nerve pinch, an ability very few human or humanoid characters of the Star Trek universe ever manifested. Seven utilizes a small pen-shaped device called a servo. It functions as a communication device, a remote control to his personal transporter, a handheld weapon with both stun and kill settings and enough precision to manipulate technology at a distance.

== Other Star Trek appearances ==
=== Star Trek novels ===
In Greg Cox's The Eugenics Wars novels, Gary Seven had numerous dealings with Khan Noonien Singh and initially hopes to train Khan as his successor. Along with his now-partner Roberta Lincoln, Seven tries to prevent World War III in a variety of ways. Seven leaves Earth in 1996, after sending Khan on the DY-100 class sleeper ship SS Botany Bay.

Cox also wrote a 1997 novel, Assignment: Eternity, featuring Seven. In this novel, the alien agency which Seven works for is called the "Aegis", though whether this refers to the organization or the alien species in charge of the organization is unclear.

Seven is mentioned, but not seen, in the Star Trek: Department of Temporal Investigations: Watching the Clock novels as well as the 2017 novel Star Trek: The Next Generation: Hearts and Minds.

=== Star Trek comics ===
According to several issues of the Star Trek comic books released by DC Comics in the 1990s (written by Howard Weinstein and Michael Jan Friedman), Gary Seven and Isis were sent by a force known as the "Aegis", who took individuals from many worlds to selectively alter historical events. They gave their agents long lifespans, estimated to be as long as 1,000 years. Not all of these interventions went well‍—at least one led to an agent becoming the sole survivor of his homeworld‍—leading to a small rebellion against the Aegis. Several agents go so far as to injure or murder innocent beings who stand in their way.

Gary Seven later went against the wishes of the Aegis when he tried to stop the Devidians from altering the timeline so that the Federation would fall to the Romulans. Seven died in an initial attempt to rescue Spock from the Devidians, but was pulled from the timeline by the Aegis prior to the moment of his death after Exana (another agent of the Aegis, who was romantically involved with Seven) stopped the Devidians with the aid of Captain Kirk and Captain Picard.

In 2008, IDW Publishing launched an Assignment: Earth comic miniseries written and drawn by John Byrne.

=== Star Trek: Picard ===
In the second season of Star Trek: Picard, the character Tallinn is introduced. She is shown to be a supervisor, in 2024, carrying out the same role of guiding important human events that Gary Seven did in 1968. In the episode "Watcher", Guinan tells Jean-Luc Picard that there is a supervisor in Los Angeles. In the episode "Fly Me to the Moon", when Picard meets Tallinn, and she states she was recruited to be a supervisor, he tells her: "Supervisors? Kirk's Enterprise crossed paths with a human called Gary. Gary Seven. He too was recruited by superior beings as an agent who would, in your words, protect the tapestry of history."
