= Khan Noonien Singh =

Fictional character from Star Trek

- Star Trek character
- Montalbán as Khan in "Space Seed"
- First appearance: "Space Seed"; February 16, 1967
- Created by: Gene Roddenberry; Gene L. Coon; Carey Wilber
- Portrayed by: Ricardo Montalbán (1967–1982); Benedict Cumberbatch (2013); Desmond Sivan (2023); Naveen Andrews (2025)

Khan Noonien Singh is a fictional character in the Star Trek franchise, a genetically engineered superhuman who first appeared as the main antagonist in the Star Trek: The Original Series episode "Space Seed" (1967), and was portrayed by Ricardo Montalbán, who reprised his role in the 1982 film Star Trek II: The Wrath of Khan. In the 2013 film Star Trek Into Darkness, he is portrayed by Benedict Cumberbatch.

Khan controlled more than a quarter of the Earth during the Eugenics Wars of the 1990s. After being revived from suspended animation in 2267 by the crew of the Starship Enterprise, he attempts to capture the starship but is thwarted by James T. Kirk and exiled to Ceti Alpha V, where he has the chance to create a new society with his people. In Star Trek II: The Wrath of Khan, set 15 years after "Space Seed", Khan escapes his exile and sets out to exact revenge on Kirk.

In Star Trek Into Darkness, set in the alternate continuity established in Star Trek (2009), Khan is awakened almost a decade before the events of "Space Seed". He is given the false identity John Harrison and coerced by Admiral Marcus into building weapons for Section 31 and Starfleet in exchange for the lives of Khan's crew. He ultimately rebels and comes into conflict with the crew of Enterprise.

== Appearances ==
=== "Space Seed" ===
Khan makes his introductory appearance as the main antagonist in the episode "Space Seed", first broadcast on February 16, 1967. According to the backstory revealed in the episode, Khan is one of a group of genetically engineered superhumans, bred to be free of the usual human mental and physical limitations, who were removed from power after the Eugenics Wars of the 1990s. Khan had been both the most successful conqueror and the most benign ruler of the group, ruling more than a quarter of the Earth's area across Asia to the Middle East from 1992 to 1996 with a firm but generally peaceful hand until he was deposed. While most of the supermen were killed or sentenced to death, Khan and 84 others escaped Earth by way of the sleeper ship SS Botany Bay. Botany Bay is discovered by the crew of the Starship Enterprise in 2267, with Khan and 72 of the 84 crew members of Botany Bay still alive, cryogenically frozen in suspended animation.

When Khan's sleep chamber malfunctions, he is transported to the Enterprise, where he reawakens and learns he is in the 23rd century. Given spacious quarters while Botany Bay is towed to a starbase, Khan fascinates and charms the ship's historian, Marla McGivers (Madlyn Rhue), while using his access to the ship's technical manuals to learn how to take over and operate the Enterprise. McGivers agrees to help Khan revive the other supermen, allowing him to organize an attempted takeover. To coerce the Enterprise crew to cooperate with him, Khan places Captain James T. Kirk (William Shatner) in the ship's decompression chamber and threatens to kill Kirk unless the crew submits. McGivers cannot stand by as her captain dies and frees Kirk, who neutralizes Khan's men by using a neural gas. Khan heads to engineering and sets the ship's engines to self-destruct, whereupon he is incapacitated by Kirk. Captain Kirk conducts a hearing, sentencing Khan and his followers to exile on an uncolonized world, Ceti Alpha V. Khan accepts Kirk's challenge—evoking the fall of Lucifer in Milton's Paradise Lost—and McGivers joins Khan rather than face court-martial. Spock (Leonard Nimoy) wonders what the "seed" Kirk has planted will bear in a hundred years.

=== Star Trek II: The Wrath of Khan ===
Khan returns as the main antagonist in the 1982 feature film Star Trek II: The Wrath of Khan. Captain Clark Terrell (Paul Winfield) and First Officer Pavel Chekov (Walter Koenig) of the USS Reliant are searching for an uninhabited world to test the Genesis device, a powerful terraforming tool. They beam down to what they believe is Ceti Alpha VI; however, Chekov soon discovers the Botany Bay and realizes their true location. After Khan and his people capture them, Khan confirms that the barren world is in fact Ceti Alpha V; Ceti Alpha VI exploded six months after he and his people had been marooned, and the resulting shock shifted the orbit of their planet. The cataclysm rendered Ceti Alpha V nigh-uninhabitable. Twenty of the survivors, including McGivers, whom Khan had married, were subsequently killed by the only surviving animal life, the Ceti eel. Swearing vengeance on Kirk, now an admiral, for abandoning them to die, Khan infests Terrell and Chekov with young Ceti eels; the creatures enter their brains, rendering them vulnerable to suggestion. Khan, intent on seizing control of the Genesis device, then seizes control of the Reliant.

Khan lures the Enterprise to the space station Regula I, and he launches a surprise attack that disables Kirk's ship. Kirk tricks Khan by using a special code to remotely lower Reliant's shields, allowing Enterprise to inflict significant damage. Khan is forced to withdraw to make repairs. Using the mind-controlled Terrell and Chekov as spies, Khan captures the Genesis device and leaves Kirk marooned on Regula I. Spock deceives Khan into thinking that the Enterprise is crippled, surprising Khan when the Enterprise rescues Kirk and escapes to the nearby Mutara Nebula. Goaded into following Kirk, Khan pilots Reliant into the nebula, where shields and sensors are inoperable. Due to Khan's inexperience with three-dimensional space combat, Enterprise defeats Reliant and Khan is fatally wounded. Refusing to accept defeat, Khan activates the Genesis device, intent on killing his foe along with himself. Khan quotes Ahab's words of vengeance from Moby-Dick before dying: "From hell's heart I stab at thee; for hate's sake, I spit my last breath at thee."

=== Star Trek Into Darkness ===
Khan appears in the 2013 film Star Trek Into Darkness, taking place in the alternate timeline established in Star Trek (2009). While the character's backstory remains the same, Khan is revived by Starfleet Admiral Alexander Marcus rather than the crew of Enterprise. Marcus anticipates a war with the Klingons, and forces Khan to develop warships and weapons for Starfleet under the cover identity of John Harrison, holding Khan's shipmates hostage. These developments include advanced long-range torpedoes and the warship USS Vengeance.

Khan carries out an attack on a high level Starfleet meeting, killing Admiral Christopher Pike, then fleeing to the Klingon homeworld Qo'noS. Marcus arms the Enterprise with 72 advanced torpedoes and sends Kirk and crew to Qo'noS with orders to kill Khan. Kirk goes against his orders and attempts to capture him alive. Upon learning the number of torpedoes on board Enterprise, Khan surrenders, revealing his identity, the presence of his followers inside the torpedoes, and the reasons for his attacks.

When Marcus arrives aboard Vengeance and attacks Enterprise, Kirk and Khan work together to take control of Vengeance's bridge. Once in control of Vengeance, Khan kills Marcus and demands that Spock return his crew. Spock, having removed Khan's people from the torpedoes, lowers Enterprise's shields and allows Khan to beam the activated weapons' warheads aboard Vengeance. Before Khan can attack Enterprise Spock remotely detonates the torpedoes crippling Vengeance. Khan crashes Vengeance in San Francisco in an attempt to destroy Starfleet Headquarters and escape, but is pursued and captured by Spock and Uhura. Khan is placed back into cryogenic sleep along with his crew.

=== "Tomorrow and Tomorrow and Tomorrow" ===
Khan appears as a child in the Star Trek: Strange New Worlds second season episode "Tomorrow and Tomorrow and Tomorrow", in which Sera (Adelaide Kane), a time-traveling Romulan agent, attempts to derail human history by assassinating Khan during his youth. She was ultimately stopped by Khan's own descendant, La'an Noonien-Singh (Christina Chong), alongside an alternate timeline version of James T. Kirk (Paul Wesley), who were sent back in time to preserve the course of history. The episode takes place in an alternate 2024, where Khan's birth was delayed due to the intervention of time travelers.

=== Novels and comics ===
Khan has been depicted in various novels and comic book publications. As with all non-television and non-film Star Trek material, the publications are outside of Star Trek canon.

Author Greg Cox penned three Star Trek novels featuring Khan, published by licensee Pocket Books. In the two-volume The Eugenics Wars: The Rise and Fall of Khan Noonien Singh, Khan is depicted as a North Indian from a family of Sikhs. "Khan" is a title; his adoptive parents are from Chandigarh, Punjab, India and are both eugenic scientists. At the end of the second novel, Khan and his followers are placed aboard the Botany Bay by Gary Seven as part of a deal to stop Khan's machinations on Earth. The 2005 follow-up, To Reign in Hell: The Exile of Khan Noonien Singh, relates what happened to Khan and his fellow exiles between the events of "Space Seed" and The Wrath of Khan. A different version of Khan's exile on Ceti Alpha V is depicted in IDW Publishing's 2010 comic miniseries Khan: Ruling in Hell.

From 2013 to 2014, IDW published a five-part series of comic books telling the story of the Into Darkness incarnation of Khan. The first issue in the series acknowledges the discrepancy of Khan's physical appearance compared to that of the previous incarnation. In keeping with the prime timeline's backstory, Khan's beginnings, rise to power, and involvement in the Eugenics War are depicted. It is also revealed his birth name was Noonien Singh and that he adopted the title "Khan" out of admiration for Genghis Khan. The series goes on to mention that Khan's anatomy and memories were altered per Marcus's orders, so that Khan would initially believe himself to be the fabricated Harrison.

=== Star Trek: Khan (audio drama) ===
A new take of Khan's backstory is presented in the nine-part 2025 audio drama Star Trek: Khan, which explores his nearly two decades of exile on Ceti Alpha V. Written by Kirsten Beyer and David Mack, based on a story by Nicholas Meyer, and directed by Fred Greenhalgh, it is the first canonical bridge between the events of Space Seed and The Wrath of Khan.

The series depicts Khan (voiced by Naveen Andrews) and his followers – including Marla McGuyvers (voiced by Wrenn Schmidt) – as they attempt to build a new society after their banishment by Captain Kirk. Confronting dangerous species, including the neuroinvasive Ceti eels, as well as environmental instability and planetary threats following the destruction of the neighbouring planet, Khan's leadership is tested and his community faces mounting losses. The narrative introduces additional factions on the planet, expanding the political and moral pressures shaping Khan's rule, tracing his transformation from a self‑styled visionary into a hardened figure driven by grief and betrayal.

The framing story, set a few decades later, introduces archaologist Dr. Rosalind Lear (voiced by Sonya Cassidy), working with Captain Hikaru Sulu and Ensign Tuvok (voiced by their original actors George Takei and Tim Russ) on the U.S.S. Excelsior.

== Development ==
=== Initial development ===
Writer Carey Wilber pitched "Space Seed" to Star Trek producers Gene Roddenberry, Gene L. Coon and Robert H. Justman with an 18-page outline dated August 29, 1966. In the outline, Wilber envisioned the crew of Botany Bay as criminals sent on a 1,500-year journey to make room on Earth for others. Khan was represented as a Nordic criminal with a "magnificent" body, Harald Ericsson. The producers suggested changes to the outline in a series of memos; in memos dated September 7 and 9, Coon suggested significant changes to Ericsson. "I want to rather do more with him than you have indicated in the story outline," he wrote. Believing that Ericsson (misspelled as Erickson in the memo) could be a worthy adversary for Kirk, Coon suggested that the character be "in fact very similar to James Kirk, our captain, except that our captain has made an adjustment to this world and this culture [...] In other words, Carey, build us a giant of a man."

The first draft of the script introduced the character as John Ericssen—who is revealed to be a man involved in "The First World Tyranny", named Ragnar Thorwald. The character of Thorwald was more brutal than Khan in the final version, killing guards using a phaser. In the original script, Kirk forgives Ericssen and offers him and his people a chance at a fresh start—something that remained in the final episode—but the character committing murder would have precluded such an ending, as NBC censors would have necessitated the "bad guy" be punished for his actions.

By the final draft, Khan is Indian; a character guesses that Khan is from Northern India and "probably a Sikh". Khan's full name was based on that of Kim Noonien Singh, a pilot Roddenberry served with during the Second World War. Roddenberry lost touch with his friend and had hoped that Singh's similar name might attract his attention and renew his old acquaintance.

In "Space Seed", Khan is presented as having several positive characteristics: he is gracious, smiling, fearless, and generous. He is not threatened by the success of others and encourages their self-esteem. He is also ambitious and desiring a challenge commensurate with his abilities, but this ambition is not tempered by any consideration of the rights of others. Author Paul Cantor asserts that Khan is a mirror image of Kirk, sharing his aggressiveness, ambition, and even his womanizing tendencies, but possessing them in far greater degree. During the episode, several of the characters express their admiration for the man even as they oppose him, with Kirk referring to him as "the best of the tyrants, and the most dangerous." The character's superhuman appearance and accent (Montalbán was born and raised in Mexico in a Spanish speaking household) strongly differentiate him from most Star Trek characters.

=== The Wrath of Khan ===
Khan (Ricardo Montalbán) and his followers in The Wrath of Khan

After the disappointing response to the first Star Trek feature film, The Motion Picture's plot and direction, Paramount executives appointed Harve Bennett, a television producer who had never watched Star Trek, to be executive producer for the sequel. Bennett watched all the original series episodes and chose Khan from "Space Seed" as a possible villain for the film. Early drafts of the script had Khan as a shadowy tyrant leading a planet in revolt; later drafts added the "Genesis device", which Khan would steal.

Costume designer Robert Fletcher wanted to emphasize the effects of their harsh environment on Khan and his followers. "My intention with Khan was to express the fact that they had been marooned on that planet with no technical infrastructure, so they had to cannibalize from the spaceship whatever they used or wore. Therefore, I tried to make it look as if they had dressed themselves out of pieces of upholstery and electrical equipment that had composed the ship," he said. Director Nicholas Meyer told Montalbán to keep Khan's right glove on at all times in order to give viewers a puzzle about which they could form their own opinions and add mystery to the character. Meyer has been repeatedly asked if Montalbán wore a prosthetic chest for his scenes, as his uniform was purposefully designed with an open front. Meyer replied in audio commentary for the film that Montalbán (who was 61 during filming) is "one strong cookie" and that no prosthetics were applied to the actor's sizeable frame.

At no point during The Wrath of Khan are Khan and Kirk in the same location; they speak to each other only over communication links such as view screens. This was due in part to the fact that the set of the Reliant was a redress of the Enterprise bridge, and the two actors' scenes were filmed four months apart. Montalbán recited his lines with a script assistant, instead of to William Shatner.

Montalbán said in promotional interviews for the film he realized early on in his career that a good villain does not see himself as villainous. The villain may do villainous things, but he feels that he is doing them for righteous reasons. Montalbán further stated he always tried to find a flaw in the character, as no one is completely good or completely evil; while Khan had a rather distorted view of reality and therefore performed acts of evil, he still felt that his vengeance was a noble cause because of the death of his wife. Khan quotes the character of Ahab from Moby-Dick throughout the film, driving home his lust to make Kirk pay for the wrongs he has inflicted upon him.

=== Star Trek Into Darkness ===
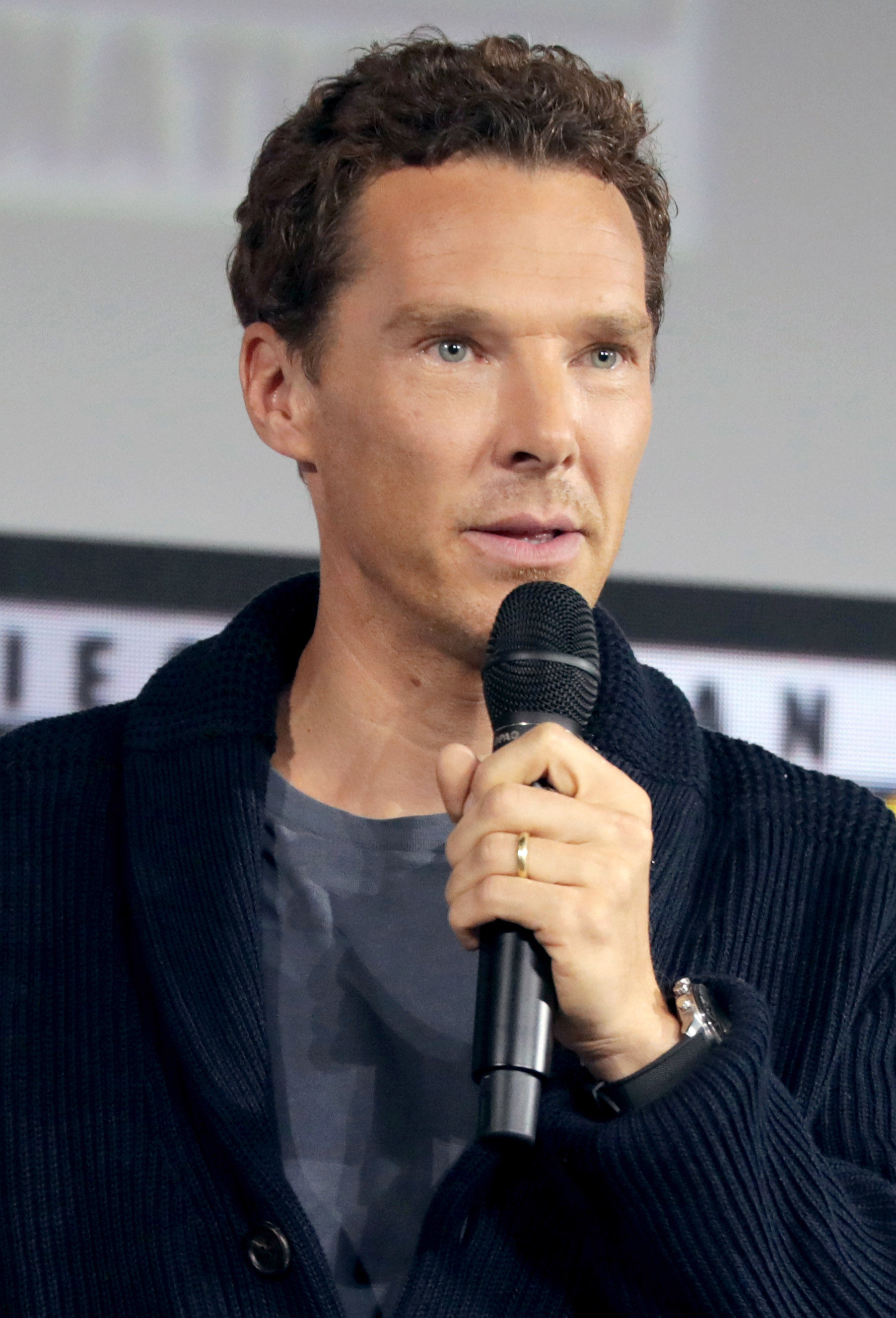
Benedict Cumberbatch plays Khan in Star Trek Into Darkness.

Following the box office success of J. J. Abrams' Star Trek reboot and the announcement that actors Chris Pine and Zachary Quinto had tentatively agreed to appear in two sequels, Internet rumors began circulating about the plot of the second film. Abrams hinted that because of the alternate timeline created in the first film, reintroducing Khan into Star Trek lore remained a possibility. Abrams told MTV, "[Khan and Kirk] exist—and while their history may not be exactly as people are familiar with, I would argue that a person's character is what it is," Abrams said of the notion that his Khan could be just as evil, even if Kirk never stranded him on Ceti Alpha V. "Certain people are destined to cross paths and come together, and Khan is out there... even if he doesn't have the same issues." Writer Damon Lindelof declared that Khan's "intense gravity," particularly regarding the character's delivery of monologues, made him an obligatory character to use, even if its iconic status made the crew afraid of the fan reaction. Lindelof jokingly stated that "it was never really a 'Should we or shouldn't we?' as much as it was 'We really have to do this but if we don't get it right people are going to kill us.'"

As part of the secrecy campaign, Benedict Cumberbatch denied that he was playing Khan during interviews, describing Harrison as simply a terrorist with his own purposes, as well as "someone that's activated and manufactured in a way by Starfleet, and it's a scene that has come back to haunt him." He discussed the character's moral ambiguity saying it fit the adage "one man's terrorist is another man's freedom fighter," adding parallels to the current world order "whether it's U.S. foreign policy or the actions of some terrorists". Into Darkness writers Roberto Orci and Alex Kurtzman added that they used the character of Khan not just for his popularity with the fandom—"It's so easy to fall into the trap of doing something because you think people are going to love it. You must come up with what the movie can be on its own and then, if it turns out the villain maybe can be Khan, then you can do it. But you can't start there."—but for fitting the sequel's theme of "how far will we go to exact vengeance and justice on an enemy that scares us."

Some protested Cumberbatch's casting as Khan, believing that a person of Indian descent should have been given the role instead.

== Analysis ==
Superficially, Khan has been compared to Friedrich Nietzsche's concept of the "Übermensch" (superman or overman). Khan is mentally and physically superior to any normal human. In the Star Trek: Enterprise episode "Borderland", Malik, the leader of a group of "supermen" created from the same genetic engineering project as Khan, quotes Nietzsche, telling Archer that "Mankind is something to be surpassed". Professor William J. Devlin and coauthor Shai Biderman examined Khan's character compared to the Übermensch and found that Khan's blind pursuit of revenge is against Nietzsche's ideals of transcendence and self-creation of a meaningful life. Instead, the authors offer Spock's self-sacrifice in The Wrath of Khan as a better example of the Übermensch.

== Reception and legacy ==
Montalbán's performance as Khan was favorably received by critics. Discussing the Star Trek motion pictures, the Associated Press noted that Star Trek films were measured by how menacing their foe was, and that Khan was among the best in the series; a 2002 review of the Star Trek films ranked Khan as the greatest enemy seen in any of the films. Reviewers of The Wrath of Khan, such as Roger Ebert, rated Khan as one of the strongest aspects of the film. New Yorker critic Pauline Kael said Montalbán's performance "was the only validation he has ever had of his power to command the big screen."

Critic Christopher Null notes that "it is nearly gospel now among Trekkies that... Star Trek II: The Wrath of Khan is the undisputed best of the series, and will likely never meet its equal," and calls Khan the "greatest role of [Montalbán's] career". Though he felt that the villain of Star Trek: The Motion Picture, V'Ger, was more cerebral and interesting, author James Iaccino notes that most fans and moviegoers preferred the archetypical good-versus-evil fight that the struggle between Khan and Kirk represents. Villains in subsequent Star Trek films have been measured by the standard of Khan, with Paramount promising fans that the villain of Star Trek Generations would be equal to the genetic superman. IGN ranked Khan as the best Star Trek villain, noting that he set the pattern for revenge-seeking villains in the series; in the decades since the film's release, "even those with a passing interest [in Trek] know the name." Star Trek producer Rick Berman called the villain "threatening and memorable."

Khan is also recognized as a great villain outside of the Star Trek series. The Associated Press called the character "one of sci-fi's great villains". In 2002, the Online Film Critics Society's 132 members voted Khan as the 10th-greatest screen villain of all time, the only Star Trek character to appear in the listing. In 2006, Emmy Magazine voted Khan "TV's Most Out-of-This-World Character", beating out other science fiction characters such as the Doctor and Commander Adama. Editors wrote that "Khan was so cool we would've bought a Chrysler Cordoba if he'd told us to," alluding to an ad campaign Montalbán appeared in for Chrysler. The character also had a cultural impact outside of Star Trek fandom; a clip from The Wrath of Khan featuring Kirk screaming "Khaaan!" was one popular culture appropriation that became a "popular fad" driving the success of the website YTMND.

In 2004, the Star Trek franchise returned to Khan's backstory in a three-episode story arc on Star Trek: Enterprise. In "Borderland", "Cold Station 12" and "The Augments", a 22nd-century scientist is portrayed as having revived genetically engineered embryos from Khan's time and raised them as "Augments". Enterprise producer Manny Coto described these characters as "mini Khan Noonien Singhs". A descendant of Khan, La'an Noonien-Singh, appears in Star Trek: Strange New Worlds; in the time-traveling episode "Tomorrow and Tomorrow and Tomorrow", Khan appears as a child played by Desmond Sivan.

Benedict Cumberbatch's performance in Star Trek Into Darkness drew praise from critics with Peter Travers of Rolling Stone magazine calling it a "tour-de-force to be reckoned with" and his character "a villain for the ages". Joe Neumaier of New York's Daily News wrote that Cumberbatch delivered "one of the best blockbuster villains in recent memory". Jonathan Romney of The Independent specifically noted Cumberbatch's voice saying it was "So sepulchrally resonant that it could have been synthesised from the combined timbres of Ian McKellen, Patrick Stewart and Alan Rickman holding an elocution contest down a well." The New York Times praised his screen presence saying "He fuses Byronic charisma with an impatient, imperious intelligence that seems to raise the ambient I.Q. whenever he's on screen."

Christian Blauvelt from website Hollywood.com criticized the casting of Khan in Star Trek Into Darkness as being "whitewashed into oblivion". Star Trek: Voyager actor Garrett Wang tweeted, "The casting of Cumberbatch was a mistake on the part of the producers. I am not being critical of the actor or his talent, just the casting."

Co-producer and co-screenwriter Roberto Orci addressed the issue of the casting:

Basically, as we went through the casting process and we began honing in on the themes of the movie, it became uncomfortable for me to support demonizing anyone of color, particularly any one of Middle Eastern descent or anyone evoking that. One of the points of the movie is that we must be careful about the villain within us, not some other race.
