= Carey Wilber =

American journalist and TV writer

Carey Wilber (June 26, 1916 – May 2, 1998) was an American journalist and television writer born in Buffalo, New York. He began the TV portion of his career in the days of live television, and wrote for a variety of programs over the next three decades, including Captain Video and His Video Rangers, The Asphalt Jungle, Lost In Space, The Time Tunnel, Bonanza, and Maverick. Wilber wrote the "Ice Princess" storyline for the daytime serial General Hospital in 1981. He died in Seattle, Washington.

== Early years ==
Wilber was a native of Buffalo, New York. His father, Willis Wilber, was a newspaperman. Wilber attended Holy Angels School and St. Joseph's Collegiate Institute. After leaving high school, he lived with his grandmother on her farm in Gowanda, New York, and delivered milk for Wilber Farms Dairy. His other jobs in his youth included selling brushes door-to-door and working at Republic Steel and at a gas station. He joined the United States Army Reserve and, while waiting for his orders, he worked at the Tonawanda News, where his father was managing editor. He had taken flight instruction at the State University of Buffalo in 1942, and his military duties made him a training officer for the Air Force in Mississippi. His jobs after returning to civilian life included driving a truck, flying a plane, prospecting for gold, and drilling for oil, in addition to working at newspapers.

== Career ==
Before Wilber shifted his focus to TV, he worked for 10 newspapers in places including Anchorage, Alaska, and Birmingham, Alabama, with his tenures ranging from six weeks to four years in each place. He was a writer for The Globe and Mail in Toronto, Canada, when he watched a TV program while on a week's leave in New York City. He decided to try his hand at writing for TV, bought a book on that topic, and began creating scripts when he returned to Toronto. His first submissions were rejected before another was accepted by the agency that produced Armstrong Circle Theatre.

== Star Trek ==
Wilber wrote the original story for, and co-wrote the teleplay of, the Star Trek episode "Space Seed". The general plot had originally been created by Wilber for the series Captain Video and His Video Rangers, which featured humans from Ancient Greece who were preserved in cryogenic suspension and resurrected. During the conception and writing of the episode, numerous changes were made, as producer Bob Justman felt that it would be too expensive to film. Despite this, and due to the support of NBC executives, Justman gave a series of notes to Wilber for him to redraft the proposal. Eventually, it was passed to Gene L. Coon to revise, and the final draft was also revised by series creator Gene Roddenberry. These revisions include the marooning of the criminals at the end of the episode, and the change of the primary villain from a Nordic character to a Sikh. Roddenberry attempted to claim the primary writing credit for "Space Seed", a request that was turned down by the Writers Guild of America.

== Personal life ==
Wilber was married and had five children.

== Filmography ==
=== Films ===
Year	Film	Credit	Notes
1968	Tarzan and the Four O'Clock Army	Written By	
1971	Tarzan and the Perils of Charity Jones	Written By	
1978	Confessions of a DA Man	Screenplay By	Television Movie
1982	Aliens from Another Planet	Written By	Segment: "Chase Through Time"

=== Television ===
Year	TV Series	Credit	Notes
1952	Gulf Playhouse	Writer	1 Episode
1952-53	Lux Video Theatre	Writer	4 Episodes
1952-54	Armstrong Circle Theatre	Writer	5 Episodes
1953	General Electric Theater	Writer	1 Episode
1953	Kraft Television Theatre	Writer	2 Episodes
1954	The Secret Files of Captain Video	Writer	1 Episode
1954	Schlitz Playhouse of Stars	Writer	1 Episode
1954-55	Captain Video and His Video Rangers	Writer	3 Episodes
1954-55	Studio One in Hollywood	Writer	4 Episodes
1957	Assignment Foreign Legion	Writer	2 Episodes
1957	The Adventures Of Robin Hood	Writer	1 Episode
1957-58	Harbormaster	Writer	4 Episodes
1957-59	The Californians	Writer	28 Episodes
1958	Mackenzie's Raiders	Writer	1 Episode
1958	Maverick	Writer	1 Episode
1959	Hudson's Bay	Writer	1 Episode
1959	Mike Hammer	Writer	1 Episode
1959-60	This Man Dawson	Writer	2 Episodes
1959-60	The Troubleshooters	Writer	3 Episodes
1959-69	Bonanza	Writer	5 Episodes
1960	Klondike	Writer	1 Episode
1960	The Case of the Dangerous Robin	Writer	1 Episode
1960-62	Outlaws	Writer	5 Episodes
1961	The Americans	Writer	1 Episode
1961	The Asphalt Jungle	Writer	1 Episode
1961	Target: The Corruptors!	Writer	1 Episode
1961-62	Adventures in Paradise	Writer	2 Episodes
1962-63	The Untouchables	Writer	2 Episodes
1962-64	Rawhide	Writer	4 Episodes
1963	Going My Way	Writer	1 Episode
1963	Sam Benedict	Writer	1 Episode
1963	Temple Houston	Writer	2 Episodes
1963	Wide Country	Writer	1 Episode
1963-65	The Virginian	Writer	11 Episodes
1964	The Rogues	Writer	1 Episode
1965	Daniel Boone	Writer	5 Episodes
1965	The Legend Of Jesse James	Writer	1 Episode
1965-66	The Big Valley	Writer	2 Episodes
1965-67	Lost in Space	Writer	7 Episodes
1966	The Monroes	Writer	2 Episodes
1966	12 O'Clock High	Writer	4 Episodes
1966-67	The Time Tunnel	Writer	3 Episodes
1967	Star Trek	Writer	1 Episode
1967-68	Tarzan	Writer	8 Episodes
1968-69	Ironside	Writer	2 Episodes
1968-70	Lancer	Writer	7 Episodes
1969	It Takes a Thief	Writer	1 Episode
1971	K2 + 1	Writer	1 Episode
1972	Banyon	Writer	1 Episode
1972	Emergency!	Writer	1 Episode
1973-74	Chase	Writer	2 Episodes
1973-76	Cannon	Writer	6 Episodes
1973-80	Hawaii Five-O	Writer	2 Episodes
1974	Devlin	Writer	
1974-75	The Manhunter	Writer	2 Episodes
1975	Caribe	Writer	1 Episode
1975	Barnaby Jones	Writer	1 Episode
1975	Matt Helm	Writer	1 Episode
1975-76	Bronk	Writer	2 Episodes
1977	Switch	Writer	1 Episode
1977	Wonder Woman	Writer	1 Episode
1978	Lucan	Writer	1 Episode
1979	General Hospital	Writer	1 Episode
