= Greg Cox (writer) =

American writer

- Born: 1959 (age 66–67); United States
- Occupation: Novelist
- Writing career
- Genre: Science fiction
- Website: gregcox-author.com

Greg Cox (born 1959) is an American writer of science fiction, including works that are media tie-ins. He lives in Oxford, Pennsylvania.

He has written numerous Star Trek novels, including The Eugenics Wars (Volume One and Two), The Q Continuum, Assignment: Eternity, and The Black Shore. His short fiction can be found in such anthologies as Star Trek: Tales of the Dominion War, Star Trek: The Amazing Stories and Star Trek: Enterprise logs. His first "Khan" novel, The Eugenics Wars: Volume One, was voted best sci-fi book of the year by the readers of Dreamwatch magazine. Cox can be found in a bonus feature on the "Director's Edition" DVD of Star Trek II: The Wrath of Khan.

Cox has won five Scribe Awards and was voted Grandmaster of the International Association of Media Tie-In Writers in 2018.

== Bibliography ==
=== Star Trek novels ===
- Star Trek: The Original Series
  - Assignment: Eternity (1997), ISBN 0-671-00117-5
  - The Rings of Time (2012) ISBN 978-1451655476
  - The Weight of Worlds (2013) ISBN 978-1476702834
  - No Time Like the Past (2014) ISBN 978-1476749495
  - Foul Deeds Will Rise (2014) ISBN 978-1476783246
  - Child of Two Worlds (2015) ISBN 978-1476783253
  - Miasma (2016) (ebook)
  - Legacies: Book 1 – Captain to Captain (2016) ISBN 978-1501125294
  - The Antares Maelstrom (2019) ISBN 978-1982113200
  - A Contest of Principles (2020) ISBN 978-1982134709
  - Lost to Eternity (2024) ISBN 978-1668050057
- Star Trek: The Next Generation
  - Dragon's Honor (1996), ISBN 0-671-50107-0, with Kij Johnson
- Star Trek: Deep Space Nine
  - Devil in the Sky (1995), ISBN 0-671-88114-0, with John Gregory Betancourt
- Star Trek: Voyager
  - The Black Shore (1997), ISBN 0-671-56061-1
- Star Trek: The Next Generation: The Q Continuum:
  1. Q-Space (1998), ISBN 0-671-01915-5
  2. Q-Zone (1998), ISBN 0-671-01921-X
  3. Q-Strike (1998), ISBN 0-671-01922-8
- Star Trek: The Eugenics Wars: The Rise and Fall of Khan Noonien Singh
  - Volume 1 (2001), ISBN 0-671-02127-3
  - Volume 2 (2002), ISBN 0-7434-0643-5
- Star Trek: To Reign in Hell: The Exile of Khan Noonien Singh (2005), ISBN 0-7434-5711-0

=== Other novels ===
- The Pirate Paradox (1991), ISBN 0-06-106016-X, (with Nick Baron).
- Roswell: Loose Ends (2001), ISBN 0-7434-1834-4
- Buffy the Vampire Slayer: Tales of the Slayer, Vol. 2 (2002), ISBN 978-0743427449 (short story)
- Daredevil (2003), ISBN 0-451-41080-7 (novelization)
- Underworld:
  1. Underworld (2003), ISBN 0-7434-8071-6 (novelization)
  2. Blood Enemy (2005), ISBN 0-7434-8072-4
  3. Evolution (2006), ISBN 0-7434-8073-2 (novelization)
  4. Rise of the Lycans (2009), ISBN 1-4391-1284-3 (novelization)
- Buffy the Vampire Slayer: Tales of the Slayer, Vol. 4 (2004), ISBN 978-0689869556 (short story)
- Fantastic Four: War Zone (2005), ISBN 1-4165-0965-8
- Alias: Two of a Kind? (2005), ISBN 1-4169-0213-9
- Alias: The Road Not Taken (2005), ISBN 1-4169-0248-1
- Infinite Crisis (2006), ISBN 0-441-01444-5
- Iron Man: The Armor Trap (1995) ISBN 1-57297-008-1
- Iron Man: Operation A.I.M. (1996) ISBN 1-57297-195-9
- 52 (2007) ISBN 0-441-01507-7
- Countdown (2009) ISBN 0-441-01718-5
- The 4400
  - The Vesuvius Prophecy (2008), ISBN 1-4165-4317-1
  - Welcome to Promise City (2009), ISBN 1-4165-4322-8
- Terminator Salvation: Cold War (2009), ISBN 1-84856-087-7
- Final Crisis (2010), ISBN 978-1-937007-09-6
- Warehouse 13: A Touch of Fever (2011), ISBN 978-0-7434-9173-0
- The Dark Knight Rises (2012), ISBN 978-1781161067 (novelization)
- Man of Steel (2013), ISBN 9781781165997 (novelization)
- Leverage: The Bestseller Job (2013) ISBN 978-0425253854
- Godzilla: The Official Novelization (2014) ISBN 978-1783290949
- The Librarians
  1. The Librarians and the Lost Lamp (2016) ISBN 978-0765384072
  2. The Librarians and the Mother Goose Chase (2017) ISBN 978-0765384157
  3. The Librarians and the Pot of Gold (2019) ISBN 978-0765384102
- Batman: The Court of Owls (2019) ISBN 978-1785658167

=== Short fiction ===
- "Almost 11", Aboriginal Science Fiction, (December 1986), ISSN 0888-3475
- "Catwomen", The Further Adventures of Batman, Vol 3, Featuring Catwoman edited by Martin H. Greenberg, Bantam Books (1993)
- "The Weeping Woman", Tales of Zorro edited by Richard Dean Starr, Moonstone Books (2008), ISBN 978-1-933076-31-7

=== Non-fiction ===
- The Transylvanian Library: A Consumer's Guide to Vampire Fiction, Borgo Press, (1991)

=== Podcast ===
- Blood & Gold, Realm, (2022–23); adapted for audio from Jeffrey J. Mariotte and Peter Murrieta's novel Blood and Gold: The Legend of Joaquin Murrieta
