= Secret Hideout =

Film and television production company

- Industry: Entertainment
- Predecessor: K/O Paper Products
- Founded: April 22, 2014; 12 years ago
- Founder: Alex Kurtzman
- Headquarters: Santa Monica, California
- Key people: Aaron Baiers (President of Television); Robyn Johnson (Director of Development)
- Products: Television series; Motion pictures

Secret Hideout is a film and television production company founded in 2014 by Alex Kurtzman. It is notable for its involvement in the production of every incarnation of the Star Trek franchise since 2017, alongside Roddenberry Entertainment.

== History ==
In 2014, Alex Kurtzman and Roberto Orci announced that they would dissolve the partnership in motion pictures in order to focus solely on television.

Later that year, the company signed a three-year production deal with Universal Pictures to produce its feature films. Secret Hideout's first film was The Mummy. They hired Jeb Brody, who was formerly an employee of Focus Features, and Bobby Cohen, who was a former K/O Paper Products staffer, to join the company, along with Kim Rosen, who served as head of digital and interactive.

In 2016, it was announced that Roberto Orci was not attached to CBS All Access' revival of Star Trek: Discovery and that Kurtzman had signed a new deal with CBS Television Studios to produce Discovery along with Salvation. They hired former K/O staffers Heather Kadin and Aaron Baiers to join the company to manage its TV shows.

In 2018, they signed a new deal with CBS Television Studios to expand the Star Trek franchise with new incarnations.

In 2019, Robyn Johnson was hired as a development executive for Secret Hideout.

In 2021, Kurtzman and Secret Hideout extended their overall deal with CBS Studios through 2026. Baiers was also promoted to President of Television in late 2021, following Kadin's departure from the company.

== Filmography ==
=== Television ===
| Release | Title |
|---|---|
| 2017–2018 | Salvation |
| 2017–2024 | Star Trek: Discovery |
| 2018–2020 | Star Trek: Short Treks |
| 2018–2019 | Instinct |
| 2020–2023 | Star Trek: Picard |
| 2020–2024 | Star Trek: Lower Decks |
| 2020 | The Comey Rule |
| 2021 | Clarice |
| 2021–2024 | Star Trek: Prodigy |
| 2022 | The Man Who Fell to Earth |
| 2022–present | Star Trek: Strange New Worlds |
| 2026–present | Star Trek: Starfleet Academy |

=== Film ===
| Year | Title |
|---|---|
| 2017 | The Mummy |
| 2025 | Star Trek: Section 31 |
| 2025 | Now You See Me: Now You Don't |
