= Star Trek: Khan =

American audio drama series

- Running time: 30–40 minutes
- Country of origin: United States
- Language: English
- Starring: Naveen Andrews; Wrenn Schmidt; Sonya Cassidy; George Takei; Tim Russ
- Written by: Kirsten Beyer; David Mack
- Directed by: Fred Greenhalgh
- Produced by: Robyn Johnson
- Executive producers: Alex Kurtzman; Aaron Baiers; Kirsten Beyer; Molly Barton; Fred Greenhalgh; Trevor Roth; Rod Roddenberry

Star Trek: Khan is an American audio drama series directed by Fred Greenhalgh and written by Kirsten Beyer and David Mack, based on a story by Nicholas Meyer. It is part of executive producer Alex Kurtzman's expanded Star Trek Universe. The series explores Khan Noonien Singh during the nearly 20 years that he is stranded on the planet Ceti Alpha V between the events of the Star Trek: The Original Series episode "Space Seed" (1967) and Meyer's film Star Trek II: The Wrath of Khan (1982).

Naveen Andrews stars as Khan, with Wrenn Schmidt, Sonya Cassidy, George Takei, and Tim Russ also starring. Work on the project, which originated as a three-episode television miniseries written by Meyer, was first revealed in June 2017. That version did not move forward due to the cost of producing such a short series. Kurtzman revealed plans to expand the Star Trek Universe into scripted podcasts in May 2022, and Meyer announced Star Trek: Khan – Ceti Alpha V that September. In November 2023, the series was being expanded from Meyer's three-episode plan. Voice recording was completed by the end of February 2025, when the main cast and crew were announced along with the shortened title Star Trek: Khan. Additional casting and the series' framing story were revealed in July, with Takei and Russ announced to be reprising their roles from previous Star Trek media.

Star Trek: Khan premiered on all major podcast streaming platforms on September 8, 2025. The nine-episode series was released weekly until November 3. It is considered, by the project's writers, to be part of the larger Star Trek canon.

== Premise ==
The series explores the nearly 20 years between the Star Trek: The Original Series episode "Space Seed" (1967, set in 2267) and the film Star Trek II: The Wrath of Khan (1982, set in 2285) when the genetically modified warlord Khan Noonien Singh and his followers are stranded on the planet Ceti Alpha V by Captain James Kirk of the USS Enterprise. It is told via a framing story, in which characters several decades later discover "lost logs" pertaining to Khan's story.

== Episodes ==
No.	Title	Directed by	Written by	Original release date
1	"Paradise"	Fred Greenhalgh	Teleplay by : Kirsten Beyer and David Mack; Story by : Nicholas Meyer	September 8, 2025
Marooned by Captain James T. Kirk on Ceti Alpha V, Khan Noonien Singh and his followers begin building a new civilization, but this strange new world harbors a number of secrets.
2	"Scheherazade"	Fred Greenhalgh	Teleplay by : Kirsten Beyer and David Mack; Story by : Nicholas Meyer	September 15, 2025
As they acclimate to the beauty and promise of their new home, Khan and his people also encounter deadly dangers waiting to catch them unawares.
3	"Do Your Worst"	Fred Greenhalgh	Teleplay by : Kirsten Beyer and David Mack; Story by : Nicholas Meyer	September 22, 2025
Khan's nascent colony celebrates its first pregnancy, but they've also suffered several losses to their number while a new threat to the entire planet reveals itself.
4	"Magical Thinking"	Fred Greenhalgh	Teleplay by : Kirsten Beyer and David Mack; Story by : Nicholas Meyer	September 29, 2025
Marla McGivers identifies an urgent threat to the colony. Khan grapples with leading his followers through increasingly difficult times, and a startling revelation from Marla.
5	"Imagination's Limits"	Fred Greenhalgh	Teleplay by : Kirsten Beyer and David Mack; Story by : Nicholas Meyer	October 6, 2025
Khan and his people prepare for inescapable global calamity, and learn they are no longer alone on this world. Are these mysterious new arrivals enemies, or possible allies?
6	"The Good of All"	Fred Greenhalgh	Teleplay by : Kirsten Beyer and David Mack; Story by : Nicholas Meyer	October 13, 2025
Khan struggles to understand the Elboreans and their leader, Delmonda, while his own people's distrust of the newcomers increases in the face of impending catastrophe.
7	"I am Marla"	Fred Greenhalgh	Teleplay by : Kirsten Beyer and David Mack; Story by : Nicholas Meyer	October 20, 2025
Forging a tenuous alliance, Khan's followers and the Elboreans work toward possible mutual survival. As Khan weighs hard choices affecting both peoples, tragedy strikes.
8	"Original Sin"	Fred Greenhalgh	Teleplay by : Kirsten Beyer and David Mack; Story by : Nicholas Meyer	October 27, 2025
Five years after disaster sweeps the planet, Khan's people and the Elboreans prepare their joint, single venture toward salvation. Khan learns the truth behind their predicament.
9	"Eternity's Face"	Fred Greenhalgh	Teleplay by : Kirsten Beyer and David Mack; Story by : Nicholas Meyer	November 3, 2025
Dissent among Khan's followers threatens Venture's launch. Khan faces one last threat to his rule, and a final decision that seals his fate.

== Cast and characters ==
- Naveen Andrews as Khan Noonien Singh:
  A genetically modified warlord from the 20th century. After being awoken from suspended animation in 2267 by Captain James Kirk in the Star Trek: The Original Series episode "Space Seed" (1967), Khan is exiled on the planet Ceti Alpha V. The series explores what happens to Khan over the following 18 years, leading to him swearing vengeance against Kirk in the film Star Trek II: The Wrath of Khan (1982).
- Wrenn Schmidt as Marla McGivers:
  An historian serving on the USS Enterprise when it discovers Khan during the episode "Space Seed". McGivers becomes enthralled with Khan and opts to leave Starfleet, joining him on Ceti Alpha V where the pair get married. McGivers dies on the planet before the events of The Wrath of Khan, an event that may be explored in the series.
- Sonya Cassidy as Rosalind Lear: A doctor in the 2290s who discovers lost history logs pertaining to Khan. She believes that Kirk knew Ceti Alpha VI was unstable when he exiled Khan and his followers.
- George Takei as Hikaru Sulu: Captain of the USS Excelsior in the 2290s
- Tim Russ as Tuvok: An ensign aboard the Excelsior in the 2290s

The supporting cast includes Olli Haaskivi as Delmonda, Maury Sterling as Ivan, Mercy Malick as Ursula, and Zuri Washington as Madot.

== Production ==
=== Development ===
After joining the CBS All Access series Star Trek: Discovery (2017–2024) as a consulting producer and writer, Nicholas Meyer revealed in June 2017 that he was also working on a second, unrelated Star Trek project. Meyer previously wrote and directed the films Star Trek II: The Wrath of Khan (1982) and Star Trek VI: The Undiscovered Country (1991). In May 2018, Meyer referred to the project as a "stand-alone Star Trek-related trilogy", and said it was on hold due to the heated relationship between companies CBS and Viacom. As Viacom is the parent-company of Paramount Pictures, the studio behind the Star Trek films, CBS was not able to use content from those films at that time, and Meyer's project was rumored to be a prequel to The Wrath of Khan. The next month, after becoming sole showrunner of Discovery, Alex Kurtzman signed a five-year overall deal with CBS Television Studios to expand the Star Trek franchise beyond Discovery to several new series, miniseries, and animated series. This included a limited series based around the character Khan Noonien Singh and his storyline in The Wrath of Khan, in which he was portrayed by Ricardo Montalbán. Terry Matalas discussed becoming showrunner of the series with Kurtzman and Akiva Goldsman, before he joined the series Star Trek: Picard (2020–2023) instead.

The project was still on hold in November 2018, when Meyer revealed that it was a three-episode miniseries titled Ceti Alpha V, named for the planet that Khan and his followers live on before the events of The Wrath of Khan. He was unsure then if the project would be moving forward, and said CBS was concerned with how expensive the series would be to produce relative to its short running time. In August 2019, Viacom announced that it was merging with CBS, bringing the film and television sides of the Star Trek franchise under the control of one company, ViacomCBS, for the first time since they split in 2006. ViacomCBS announced in September 2020 that CBS All Access would be expanded and rebranded as Paramount+ in March 2021. In February 2021, Kurtzman said a new series was unlikely to be added to Paramount+'s slate of Star Trek Universe series until one of the existing five came to an end. A month later, Meyer said the project had originally been suggested to him by Kurtzman and he had thought it was a great idea that he was excited to pursue. He was still interested in making the project, but expressed concern at potentially having to extend it beyond the three episode plan which he felt would make it like the television series Gilligan's Island (1964–1967). In May 2022, Kurtzman said there were discussions about the Star Trek Universe expanding to other media such as video games and dramatic podcasts, and a month later Meyer said he was negotiating a deal to turn Ceti Alpha V into a podcast that he would write and possibly direct.

At a Star Trek Day event on September 8, 2022, Meyer officially announced the scripted podcast as Star Trek: Khan – Ceti Alpha V, with Kurtzman, Aaron Baiers, Trevor Roth, and Rod Roddenberry as executive producers. It was set to premiere in early 2023, but no more news was released by November of that year. Meyer said the project had "a kitchen filled with cooks", it was being expanded to nine or ten half-hour episodes, and "whatever timeline we had went out the window some months ago". He added that casting would begin and a composer would be hired once some "behind-the-scenes issues" were resolved, and there was a chance that the podcast could lead to a television or film version if it was successful. In February 2025, the project was re-confirmed as an audio series titled Star Trek: Khan. Longtime Star Trek writers Kirsten Beyer and David Mack had written the series based on Meyer's story, with Fred Greenhalgh directing, Robyn Johnson as supervising producer, and Realm as the production studio and distributor. Beyer, Greenhalgh, and Molly Barton were added as executive producers by then. Mack said he and Beyer were "tasked with developing the series from the core elements of Nick's story" and wrote the scripts in early 2024. He confirmed that the series would consist of nine half-hour episodes.

=== Writing ===
The story takes place between the events of the Star Trek: The Original Series episode "Space Seed" (1967) and The Wrath of Khan. It is billed as the untold and "recently unearthed" story of how Khan went from a "beneficent tyrant and superhuman visionary" to the monstrous figure on a quest for vengeance in The Wrath of Khan. At the end of "Space Seed", Khan and his genetically modified followers are exiled on the planet Ceti Alpha V by Captain James Kirk of the USS Enterprise. Kirk challenges Khan to turn the Eden-like planet into a utopia, but this does not go well. By the end of the story, Meyer wanted the audience to "weep for [Khan]. I hope that you understand where he's coming from and what his destiny is" leading into the events of The Wrath of Khan. He said the story was about how Khan copes with the challenges he faces on Ceti Alpha V. Khan's exile was previously covered in Greg Cox's Eugenics Wars novel series (2001–2005), but Mack said Meyer had a "completely different take" on the story which he and Beyer hoped would be surprising for fans. The series has a framing story in which "lost logs" about Khan's exile are discovered by Dr. Rosalind Lear several decades later, and are reviewed by Captain Hikaru Sulu and Ensign Tuvok of the USS Excelsior. Tuvok's role as an ensign on the Excelsior under Sulu's command was established in the Star Trek: Voyager episode "Flashback" (1996).

=== Casting and voice recording ===
Casting was underway by late August 2024, when Meyer expected voice recording to begin within a year. Recording was completed by the end of February 2025, when Naveen Andrews was announced as the voice of Khan and Wrenn Schmidt as the voice of Marla McGivers. Andrews replaced Ricardo Montalbán from "Space Seed" and The Wrath of Khan, while Schmidt replaced Madlyn Rhue who portrayed McGivers in "Space Seed". That July, more of the cast was announced: George Takei and Tim Russ reprising their respective roles of Hikaru Sulu and Tuvok from previous Star Trek media; Sonya Cassidy as new character Rosalind Lear; and supporting cast members Olli Haaskivi as Delmonda, Maury Sterling as Ivan, Mercy Malick as Ursula, and Zuri Washington as Madot.

== Release ==
Star Trek: Khan premiered on all major podcast streaming platforms on September 8, 2025, which is Star Trek Day. The nine-episode series were released weekly until November 3. It was previously set to premiere in early 2023.
