= Eugene Roddenberry =

Eugene Roddenberry may refer to:

- Gene Roddenberry (1921–1991), American screenwriter and producer
- Rod Roddenberry (Eugene Wesley Roddenberry; born 1974), son of the above, American television producer and CEO of Roddenberry Entertainment.
