= Instinct (American TV series) =

2018 American police procedural drama television series

- Genre: Police procedural; Thriller; Drama; Mystery
- Based on: Murder Games by James Patterson & Howard Roughan
- Developed by: Michael Rauch
- Starring: Alan Cumming; Bojana Novakovic; Daniel Ings; Naveen Andrews; Sharon Leal
- Composer: James S. Levine
- Country of origin: United States
- Original language: English
- No. of seasons: 2
- No. of episodes: 24

Production
- Executive producers: Michael Rauch; Alex Kurtzman; Heather Kadin; James Patterson; Bill Robinson; Leopoldo Gout; Alan Cumming; Marc Webb
- Production locations: New York City, New York
- Camera setup: Single-camera
- Running time: 44 minutes
- Production companies: 34 Films; Secret Hideout; James Patterson Entertainment; Black Lamb; CBS Television Studios

Original release
- Network: CBS
- Release: March 18, 2018 – August 25, 2019

Instinct (stylized as INSTIИCT) is an American police procedural drama television series which premiered on March 18, 2018, on CBS. The series is based on James Patterson's 2017 novel Murder Games. In May 2018, CBS renewed the series for a second season. The second season premiered on June 30, 2019. The series was cancelled near the end of its second season, on August 17, 2019. The series is notable for featuring a gay male character in the lead, who is married to another man.

== Premise ==
Author, university professor, and former CIA paramilitary officer Dr. Dylan Reinhart (Alan Cumming) is lured back to his old life by New York police detective Elizabeth Needham (Bojana Novakovic) when she needs his help to stop a serial killer who is using Reinhart's book as inspiration for murders.

== Cast and characters ==
=== Main ===
- Alan Cumming as Dylan Reinhart, an author, psychology professor, and former CIA paramilitary officer, now a consultant to the NYPD in solving bizarre cases
- Bojana Novakovic as Elizabeth "Lizzie" Needham, an NYPD detective third grade who is stationed at the fictional 11th Precinct and Dylan's partner. Her partner, and fiancé, was killed in the line of duty a year prior, and she had since then refused to have a partner before meeting Dylan.
- Daniel Ings as Andrew "Andy" Wilson, Dylan's husband, a lawyer-turned-bar-owner who still uses his law skills to help their friends when needed
- Naveen Andrews as Julian Cousins, a contact of Dylan's from his days at the CIA who now works freelance and who specializes in computers and information retrieval
- Sharon Leal as Jasmine Gooden, an NYPD lieutenant who leads the 11th Precinct and who is Lizzie's supervisor and friend

=== Recurring ===
- Whoopi Goldberg as Joan Ross (season 1), Dylan's literary agent
- Andrew Polk as Doug, the medical examiner
- John Mainieri as Jimmy Marino, a police detective
- Michael B. Silver as Kanter Harris, a police sergeant
- Danny Mastrogiorgio as Anthony Fucci, a police detective
- Alejandro Hernandez as Rafael Sosa (season 1), a police detective
- Stephen Rider as Zack Clark, a police officer, later detective
- Travis Van Winkle as Ryan Stock (season 2), a police detective from Garfield County, Nebraska, who comes to New York to help the NYPD on the case of a potential serial killer
- Reshma Shetty as Mya Bhaduri (season 2), Julian's former lover and co-worker from his days at MI6, who comes to warn him about a group trying to shut down the city's first responders' unit

== Production ==
=== Development ===
Instinct is based on James Patterson's Murder Games. The series was picked up to pilot by CBS on January 23, 2017. On May 12, 2017, CBS picked it up to series. On May 12, 2018, CBS renewed Instinct for a second season. Instinct was cancelled after its second season on August 17, 2019.

=== Casting ===
On February 8, 2017, Alan Cumming was cast as Dylan Reinhart. Bojana Novakovic was cast as Lizzie on February 18, 2017. On February 23, 2017, Daniel Ings was cast as Andy, and Naveen Andrews was cast as Julian. Khandi Alexander was originally cast as Monica Hernández in the pilot, but was replaced with Sharon Leal on June 22, 2017.

== Episodes ==
| Season | Episodes | Originally released | |
| Season | Episodes | First released | Last released |
|---|---|---|---|
| 1 | 13 | March 18, 2018 | July 1, 2018 |
| 2 | 11 | June 30, 2019 | August 25, 2019 |

=== Season 1 (2018) ===
Instinct, season 1 episodes
| No. overall | No. in season | Title | Directed by | Written by | Original release date | Prod. code | U.S. viewers (millions) |
|---|---|---|---|---|---|---|---|
| 1 | 1 | "Pilot" | Marc Webb | Michael Rauch | March 18, 2018 | INS101 | 9.05 |
A young man is murdered at a nightclub, with a playing card (jack of diamonds) left at his feet. Detective Lizzie Needham approaches Professor Dylan Reinhart at his introduction to abnormal behavior class and tells him that someone wants to kill him. The killer had sent a copy of Dylan's book, Freaks, along with a playing card (king of clubs), to the police the day before the murder. Dylan refuses to consult on the case, citing a promise that he made to his husband Andy, until his editor scolds him for his lackluster manuscript and convinces him that he needs to "get his mojo back". Dylan and Lizzie realize the playing cards at each scene are the clue to the next victim. The killer shoots at Dylan and Lizzie at the scene of the third murder, then escapes. Perusing the victims' records, Dylan and Lizzie realize they all had committed crimes but had evaded legal consequences, and that the same judge had been involved in all of the cases. At a standoff in the judge's chambers, the killer, one of the judge's clerks, says that Dylan had inspired his acts of revenge. In the altercation, Lizzie is shot in the shoulder and Dylan disarms the killer.
| 2 | 2 | "Wild Game" | Doug Aarniokoski | Carol Flint & Constance M. Burge | March 25, 2018 | INS112 | 10.16 |
A financier, out for a jog in the park at night, is killed by an arrow. His body is discovered bizarrely staged. Jasmine orders Lizzie to find a partner for the case and suggests Dylan. Lizzie and Dylan learn that the victim was about to foreclose on a restaurant and family farm owned by his friends who had borrowed money for him to finance an expansion. The marriage of the couple who own the restaurant is shaky, and the chef of the restaurant had a history of violence, as well as a recent restraining order filed by the victim. They also learn that the widow would soon have lost access to her husband's fortune due to a prenuptial agreement. Then the chef is murdered and, again, the body is bizarrely staged. Lizzie and Dylan discover that the murderer is a farmhand who was a childhood friend of the couple and had convinced herself that she was defending the husband. They decide to continue working together as partners.
| 3 | 3 | "Secrets and Lies" | Peter Werner | Chris Ambrose | April 1, 2018 | INS108 | 6.61 |
Andy receives an eviction notice from his bar's landlord. Lizzie's sister shows up unexpectedly. The body of a young man whose throat was slashed is discovered in the park. When Dylan and Lizzie try to track down the victim's girlfriend, Nikki, they discover another dead body, a photographer who had Nikki's backpack. They suspect Gene, another boyfriend of Nikki's. Lizzie arrests Gene. Nikki begs Dylan to help her, saying that she does not know who she is and cannot remember anything. A doctor diagnoses Nikki with global dissociative amnesia, but Dylan is skeptical. Discussing his doubts with Lizzie, Dylan begins to suspect that Nikki is the killer. They figure out her true identity and bring an old friend of hers to confront her. Lizzie sets boundaries with her sister about drinking. Andy and Dylan reach an agreement with the landlord.
| 4 | 4 | "I Heart New York" | Constantine Makris | Michael Rauch | April 8, 2018 | INS106 | 8.12 |
A subway car is filled with dead passengers, apparently from a chemical attack. A joint terrorism task force pushes NYPD out, so Dylan and Lizzie are assigned a case in which a small explosion at a carousel killed a man, a confidential informant for another detective. Lizzie is devastated when she learns that Jasmine asked someone else to help her with her wedding. Dylan's father shows up to help with the subway case and takes Dylan and Andy out to dinner, showing up unexpectedly with Lizzie. A body is found in a destroyed hotel room. Dylan concludes that all three crimes were committed by the same person. Lizzie and Dylan identify a Central Park carriage driver whose father killed himself 28 years earlier on the driver's birthday. The deaths were collateral damage of the disturbed driver attempting to destroy memories from that day.
| 5 | 5 | "Heartless" | Don Scardino | Michael Rauch | April 22, 2018 | INS102 | 7.11 |
The body of a young woman whose heart has been removed is found in the river. Lizzie and Dylan think they have identified the victim by the designer jacket she was wearing, but the owner, Maggie, turns out to be alive. The victim, who resembled Maggie, was renting a room from her for the weekend, so Lizzie and Dylan suspect that Maggie might have been the real target, but Maggie's stalker turns out to be a dead end. With Julian's help, Dylan identifies the victim and gains access to her phone records. Julian also tells Dylan that he discovered an active task force involving the CIA, FBI, and MI6 investigating smuggling through New York City ports that was focused on Lizzie's former partner and fiancé before his death. A man from a dating app who saw the victim that night tells Lizzie and Dylan where she went after running out on him, and they are able to track down the attack through a street camera. They discover that the murderer was trying to get revenge on Maggie's father, an organ dealer who had sold a heart that the murderer's own daughter needed to a higher bidder.
| 6 | 6 | "Flat Line" | Laura Belsey | Tanya Barfield | April 29, 2018 | INS111 | 7.01 |
When their suspect with a knife wound to the leg dies mysteriously in the hospital and an anonymous tip claims that the hospital is responsible for other deaths as well, Lizzie and Dylan investigate. Dylan suspects that Nurse Albany is an "angel of death" and enlists Julian's help to dig into the hospital's records. Nurse Albany explains to them that the administration is responsible for the deaths, restricting how much time the staff can spend with patients and refusing to repair broken equipment. Dylan and Julian sneak into the hospital in disguise to check out malfunctioning medication pumps. They find malware, which they track down to a reporter with a grudge against the hospital.
| 7 | 7 | "Owned" | Doug Aarniokoski | Jill Abbinanti | May 6, 2018 | INS104 | 6.96 |
After having a panic attack at a charity event, Jasmine's friend, Abby Wright, owner of a local basketball franchise, steals a car, calls 911, and then drives off a bridge. Lizzie and Dylan question a podcaster who had snuck into the event and whose car's paint matched that found on the wreck. Tracking Abby's vehicle on traffic cams leads them to a private investigator hired by Abby's husband to follow her. Jasmine, Lizzie, and Dylan discover that Abby's husband had been abusing her for several years.
| 8 | 8 | "Long Shot" | Jay Chandrasekhar | Carol Flint | May 27, 2018 | INS103 | 5.16 |
The director of a youth center, a Muslim female, is shot while locking up at night. Other attacks in the city seem to indicate a spate of hate crimes. A schizophrenic veteran who lived in the apartment that could have been the location of the shooter is arrested, but Dylan is convinced that the veteran is innocent. Based on a hunch by Dylan, Lizzie shows that the shot was aimed elsewhere and ricocheted into the director. They figure out that the veteran's landlady retrieved a gun that Troy had thrown in a dumpster and made the shot to try to frame the veteran because she had been unable to evict him.
| 9 | 9 | "Bad Actors" | Jim McKay | Dan E. Fesman | May 27, 2018 | INS105 | 4.68 |
An actor performing in a dog costume for a children's show is murdered by peanut dust spread inside his mask and his epinephrine injector replaced with one containing saline. Dylan and Lizzie's investigation leads them to another murder. Julian warns Dylan off the case and says he cannot provide any information. A third victim helps Lizzie and Dylan connect the crimes to a film made several years previously in Morocco, which Dylan suspects was actually an intelligence operation. With Julian's help, Dylan finds the propaganda film. The agent behind the film is trying to kill all of the actors who were involved. Lizzie is attacked by the rogue agent when she warns him, thinking that he is a potential victim. Julian and Dylan rescue Lizzie and kill the agent. Dylan and Andy attend a barbeque at Detective Fucci's.
| 10 | 10 | "Bye Bye Birdie" | Doug Aarniokoski | Constance M. Burge | June 3, 2018 | INS107 | 6.37 |
A mystery novelist is attacked. Lizzie and Dylan question the novelist's old professor who fits the attacker's description. Lizzie confesses to Dylan that she has suspicions about Charlie's actions on the operation that got him killed, and Dylan asks Julian to look for Charlie's old informant. Another woman is killed by someone who appears to be the same as the novelist's attacker. Based on DNA evidence, the professor is arrested. Lizzie goes to meet the informant based on an anonymous tip but is met by Julian pretending to be the informant. Julian tells Lizzie that Charlie was taking money from the drug cartel. When Lizzie returns to the station, she tells Dylan that she knows the man pretending to be the informant is Dylan's "secret friend". Doubting the professor's guilt, Lizzie and Dylan suspect that the novelist faked her own attack and then killed the other woman (her ex-husband's mistress) to frame the professor who had plagiarized her writing years ago. They save Joan at the last minute, but the novelist has left the country. Julian shows Dylan his evidence against Charlie, but Dylan realizes that the signature on the accounts was not Charlie's. Sosa is revealed as the corrupt cop who killed Charlie.
| 11 | 11 | "Blast from the Past" | Cherie Nowlan | Lee Ellenberg | June 17, 2018 | INS109 | 5.27 |
An apparent suicide bomber explodes in Battery Park. Lizzie and Dylan find clues in the bomber's apartment and are in Grand Central Park when the second explosion takes place. Dylan's decision to participate in an article in New York Magazine causes dissension between him and both Julian and Andy. Julian introduces himself to Lizzie and tells her of his concerns about Dylan becoming a public figure. After the third explosion, Dylan suspects that the apparent bombers are actually innocent victims and that the attacks are linked to a gifted student program he participated in as a teenager. Without telling Dylan, Lizzie reaches out to Julian for assistance with the investigation and he tells her it was a secret government experiment. Lizzie and Dylan track the crimes down to a man who was also a student in the experiment.
| 12 | 12 | "Live" | Ed Ornelas | Michael Ballin & Thomas Aguilar | June 24, 2018 | INS110 | 5.63 |
A young woman is found killed in a theater at the end of the screening of a horror movie. Lizzie and Dylan discover the murder victim was having an affair with her married professor. As Lizzie and Dylan investigate the crime scene, a film showing the murder of the victim begins to play. They connect the murder to the film class that the victim was enrolled in. The killer, the professor's assistant, takes a second victim and streams the murder attempt live, but Julian takes down his stream to stall him while Dylan and Lizzie race to the location. Dylan and Andy, who have been discussing adopting, host Andy's niece Maddy for the week. Maddy is suspended from school for bullying, but confesses to Lizzie that the mean texts were written on her phone by another girl. At Dylan's request, Julian hacks into Maddy's phone and identifies her best friend Zoe as the one sending the mean texts under Maddy's name. Lizzie and Julian kiss.
| 13 | 13 | "Tribal" | Michael Rauch | Michael Rauch | July 1, 2018 | INS113 | 4.51 |
Christy, an editor at Dylan's publisher, is killed in her office. Evidence points to her fiance, but his traffic accident makes it impossible, and it is clear that he is being framed. Searching the apartment of Chad, the man that Christy was working with on a mysterious book, they find him hung just like Christy. Dylan and Lizzie's meeting with his parents is interrupted by politician Bobby Kincannon, who gives his condolences. Dylan learns that Chad, Kincannon, and Kincannon's friend Brophy were members of the same secret society at college. Dylan discovers a listening device in his home office while an unknown woman tries to follow Lizzie. They suspect that Chad was writing a book that implicated Kincannon, who is running for senator, in the disappearance of a classmate in college. Dylan identifies Christy's boss as another member of the same secret society, but the boss becomes the third victim, although Lizzie and Dylan discover him in time to revive him. Kincannon agrees to testify against Brophy. A social worker visits Dylan and Andy's home to evaluate them as prospective adoptive parents. To allay Jasmine's suspicions about Lizzie's source of information, Dylan tells Jasmine that he had obtained the information and that Lizzie knew nothing about it.

=== Season 2 (2019) ===
Instinct, season 2 episodes
| No. overall | No. in season | Title | Directed by | Written by | Original release date | Prod. code | U.S. viewers (millions) |
|---|---|---|---|---|---|---|---|
| 14 | 1 | "Stay Gold" | Stephen Surjik | Michael Rauch | June 30, 2019 | INS201 | 3.59 |
One woman is killed and carefully laid out; across the street, another woman is killed by being trapped in her own cryogenic chamber. Dylan has been suspended from the police department. Julian's secret workroom has been compromised. Andy convinces Jasmine to allow Dylan to continue working with Lizzie. When the department starts having network problems while their IT specialist is on vacation, Jasmine hires a temporary consultant to fix the problems, Julian masquerading as "Jules". A third person is killed and he is a patient of the same psychiatrist that the woman frozen to death was seeing. One of the psychiatist's other patients who suffers from malignant narcissism was seeking revenge. Jasmine breaks up with her fiance and moves in temporarily with Lizzie. Detective Ryan Stock shows up at the department, thinking that the first victim is related to a case of his back in Garfield, Nebraska.
| 15 | 2 | "Broken Record" | Alex Pilai | Keith Foglesong | July 7, 2019 | INS202 | 3.38 |
A dead body is discovered in a roller coaster cart. Lizzie discovers a stolen Maserati in one of the victim's storage units, and they find video evidence that he had recently robbed a bank. Dylan suspects that the victim was suffering from persistent deja vu as a result of temporal lobe epilepsy. The victim was refusing to sign a lucrative contract with a music company, and Dylan convinces his manager to confess to the murder. Stock chafes at Fucci's hidebound approach to investigation. Lizzie cannot keep up with Jasmine's insistence on partying every night.
| 16 | 3 | "Finders Keepers" | Lee Rose | Carol Flint | July 14, 2019 | INS203 | 3.56 |
A young boy who is the focus of an acrimonious custody battle goes missing. Suspicion first falls on the father, who had left the boy alone while he ran to the store, but then Lizzie and Dylan find out that the maternal grandparents might have learned that the judge was likely to award custody to the father. Blood is found in one of the grandfather's work vans, and tickets to Cuba along with the boy's passport are found in their home. Stock talks to the father and is able to discover information that proves that the father was innocent in his wife's death years earlier. Lizzie and Dylan deduce that the daughters of the boy's godparents had helped him run away and he is discovered safe at their beach house.
| 17 | 4 | "Big Splash" | John Behring | Marc Dube | July 21, 2019 | INS204 | 3.27 |
Lizzie is promoted to detective second grade. Andy and Dylan hope to convince Andy's assistant manager Samantha to place her prospective baby with them. At the sweet sixteen party for a spoiled rich girl, her stepmother Ella is murdered. Dylan and Lizzie identify Ella's old partner as the murderer. Dylan and Stock go to meet an informant in Stock's case, but instead discover a photo of the informant's dead body. Julian disappears on a secret mission.
| 18 | 5 | "Ancient History" | Randy Zisk | Constance M. Burge & Jill Abbinanti | July 28, 2019 | INS205 | 3.35 |
The body of a well-known divorce lawyer, encased between two boats, is discovered in the river. Dylan identifies the method as scaphism, ancient Persian method of execution. A man comes into the station and confesses to the murder but dies from self-administered cyanide before he can answer questions. Dylan and Lizzie track down his accomplices, including the lawyer's paralegal. Julian returns with an injury that he refuses to explain to Lizzie, and she breaks up with him. The killer plants a bloody pillow and blanket in Stock's room. Samantha asks Andy and Dylan to be her baby's parents.
| 19 | 6 | "One-of-a-Kind" | Janice Cooke | Michael J. Ballin & Thomas Aguilar | August 4, 2019 | INS206 | 3.11 |
A murdered hedge fund manager is placed in an art installation by the anonymous street artist Ace. Lizzie and Dylan find evidence that the murder victim was actually Ace himself. A second body is placed in art installation, that of a woman who was Ace's partner. Lizzie and Dylan figure out that Ace was a composite of three artists, and the third killed the other two so he could claim the well-known identity. The editor filling in for Joan tracks Dylan down at the precinct to demand his manuscript, so Dylan tries to return his advance, but the editor backs down and gives Dylan more time to write his book. Stock and Fucci arrest a man who broke into Stock's hotel room; he turns out to be a true crime podcaster. The podcaster broadcasts details about the "Sleeping Beauty" murders and speaks to the murderer.
| 20 | 7 | "After Hours" | Joe Collins | Erica Saleh | August 11, 2019 | INS207 | 3.50 |
A woman is murdered and poorly staged to resemble the Sleeping Beauty killer's victims. Stock goes on the crime podcaster's show and attributes the murder to the Sleeping Beauty killer to lure him out. Lizzie and Dylan go undercover to an exclusive sex club where the victim had gone before her death. Mya, an old friend of Julian's from British intelligence, shows up.
| 21 | 8 | "Go Figure" | Cherie Nowlan | Anthony Johnston | August 11, 2019 | INS208 | 3.39 |
A figure skater is murdered when practicing. Lizzie and Dylan find evidence in her apartment that she was afraid of someone. Jasmine joins Lizzie to arrest the rink's zamboni driver. Jasmine and Lizzie find a hidden camera in the victim's apartment that leads them to her coach as her murderer. Dylan infuriates Stock when Dylan suggests there were some weaknesses in the original Nebraska investigation. When Stock calms down and follows up with the original investigator, he is shut down which convinces him that there is more to be learned back in Nebraska. Dylan accompanies Stock and they begin to investigate the original murder in Garfield. Mya tries to convince Julian to work with her, claiming that he is in danger and that the CIA is compromised.
| 22 | 9 | "Manhunt" | Constantine Makris | John Cockrell | August 18, 2019 | INS209 | 3.47 |
Dylan and Stock return to New York in pursuit of Cormac, the son of the first victim, who they now believe is the Sleeping Beauty killer. A call from his mother lets Cormac know that they are on to him; he strangles his driver and disappears. The driver, who survived, tells Lizzie and Stock the destination Cormac had given him and they find the apartment he was using. Stock flies Cormac's sister Candace to New York. Cormac agrees to meet with Candace. Cormac is wounded by Stock but escapes. Candace appeals to Cormac on the true crime podcast. Jasmine, frustrated with their lack of progress, releases Cormac's name and photo to the public. Cormac takes the podcaster hostage. Lizzie, Dylan, and Stock track Cormac to a boat and take him into custody. Dylan's father tells Dylan that there are rumors that Julian is actually planting the malware in the city's network that he is supposedly there to remove.
| 23 | 10 | "Trust Issues" | Lee Rose | Carol Flint & Constance M. Burge | August 18, 2019 | INS210 | 3.09 |
A crime scene at a brewery initially appears to be a murder-suicide, Lizzie and Dylan suspect that the apparent killer was also a victim. They uncover evidence of the brewery owner paying for protection and of local gun trafficking. They figure out that the local cop on the beat was running a gun trafficking operation and had staged the crime scene. Andy throws a surprise party for Dylan to celebrate the sonogram of their son. Julian and Dylan discover Mya dead in Julian's room. The British consul tells Dylan that Mya was not working for MI-6 as she had said. Julian and Dylan find a recording she left of an old adversary of theirs, Pasternak.
| 24 | 11 | "Grey Matter" | Michael Rauch | Michael Rauch | August 25, 2019 | INS211 | 3.43 |
A severed head is found in the lake. Looking for the body, divers find three more heads. A type of dye used in medical procedures is found in all four heads, leading Lizzie and Dylan back to the institute where the most recent victim worked. They discover that a doctor was guillotining terminal patients so he could record their brains at death. Dylan experiences worrying vision symptoms and thinks he may have been exposed to a nerve agent from Mya's body. Pasternak shows up at Dylan's MRI. He claims to have had nothing to do with Mya's death and that he needs Julian to work with him. Lizzie leaves Gary with Dylan and heads off on a road trip.

== Reception ==
=== Critical response ===
The review aggregation website Rotten Tomatoes reported an approval rating of 54% based on 26 reviews, with an average rating of 5.44/10. The website's consensus reads, "Instinct is ultimately an underwhelming police procedural, despite having Alan Cumming in its arsenal." Metacritic, which uses a weighted average, assigned the series a score of 53 out of 100 based on 12 reviews, indicating "mixed or average reviews".

The character of Dylan Reinhart has been called groundbreaking for being the first openly gay lead character in an hour-long American network television drama series. (Note: The first lesbian main character in an American prime time TV series is Marilyn McGrath on HeartBeat.)

=== Ratings ===
==== Overall ====
Viewership and ratings per season of Instinct
| Season | Timeslot (ET) | Episodes | First aired | | Last aired | | TV season | Viewership rank | Avg. viewers (millions) |
| Season | Timeslot (ET) | Episodes | Date | Viewers (millions) | Date | Viewers (millions) | TV season | Viewership rank | Avg. viewers (millions) |
|---|---|---|---|---|---|---|---|---|---|
| 1 | Sunday 8:00 p.m. | 13 | March 18, 2018 | 9.05 | July 1, 2018 | 4.51 | 2017–18 | TBD | TBD |
| 2 | Sunday 9:00 p.m. | 11 | June 30, 2019 | 3.59 | August 25, 2019 | 3.43 | 2018–19 | TBD | TBD |

==== Season 1 ====
Viewership and ratings per episode of Instinct
| No. | Title | Air date | Rating/share (18–49) | Viewers (millions) | DVR viewers (millions) | Total viewers (millions) |
|---|---|---|---|---|---|---|
| 1 | "Pilot" | March 18, 2018 | 1.0/4 | 9.05 | 2.54 | 11.59 |
| 2 | "Wild Game" | March 25, 2018 | 1.3/5 | 10.16 | 2.15 | 12.31 |
| 3 | "Secrets and Lies" | April 1, 2018 | 0.6/3 | 6.61 | —N/a | —N/a |
| 4 | "I Heart New York" | April 8, 2018 | 0.9/3 | 8.12 | 1.48 | 9.61 (Note: Live +7 ratings were not available, so Live +3 ratings have been used instead.) |
| 5 | "Heartless" | April 22, 2018 | 0.6/3 | 7.11 | 1.68 | 8.80 |
| 6 | "Flat Line" | April 29, 2018 | 0.6/3 | 7.01 | 1.79 | 8.80 |
| 7 | "Owned" | May 6, 2018 | 0.7/3 | 6.96 | 1.86 | 8.83 |
| 8 | "Long Shot" | May 27, 2018 | 0.4/2 | 5.16 | 1.70 | 6.86 |
| 9 | "Bad Actors" | May 27, 2018 | 0.3/1 | 4.68 | 1.97 | 6.65 |
| 10 | "Bye Bye Birdie" | June 3, 2018 | 0.5/2 | 6.37 | 1.82 | 8.19 |
| 11 | "Blast From the Past" | June 17, 2018 | 0.4/2 | 5.27 | 1.88 | 7.15 |
| 12 | "Live" | June 24, 2018 | 0.5/2 | 5.63 | 1.62 | 7.25 |
| 13 | "Tribal" | July 1, 2018 | 0.4/2 | 4.51 | 1.93 | 6.45 |

==== Season 2 ====
Viewership and ratings per episode of Instinct
| No. | Title | Air date | Rating/share (18–49) | Viewers (millions) | DVR viewers (millions) | Total viewers (millions) |
|---|---|---|---|---|---|---|
| 1 | "Stay Gold" | June 30, 2019 | 0.3/2 | 3.59 | 2.08 | 5.67 |
| 2 | "Broken Record" | July 7, 2019 | 0.3/2 | 3.38 | 1.96 | 5.34 |
| 3 | "Finders Keepers" | July 14, 2019 | 0.3/2 | 3.56 | 1.84 | 5.40 |
| 4 | "Big Splash" | July 21, 2019 | 0.3/2 | 3.27 | 1.56 | 4.83 |
| 5 | "Ancient History" | July 28, 2019 | 0.3/2 | 3.35 | 1.75 | 5.11 |
| 6 | "One-of-a-Kind" | August 4, 2019 | 0.3/2 | 3.11 | 1.81 | 4.92 |
| 7 | "After Hours" | August 11, 2019 | 0.4/2 | 3.50 | 1.92 | 5.42 |
| 8 | "Go Figure" | August 11, 2019 | 0.3/2 | 3.39 | 2.20 | 5.59 |
| 9 | "Manhunt" | August 18, 2019 | 0.4/2 | 3.47 | 1.86 | 5.34 |
| 10 | "Trust Issues" | August 18, 2019 | 0.3/2 | 3.09 | 2.15 | 5.25 |
| 11 | "Grey Matter" | August 25, 2019 | 0.3/2 | 3.43 | 1.91 | 5.34 |

== Home media ==
The first season was released in Region 1 on December 11, 2018, and on Region 2 on December 17, 2018.

| DVD name | Ep # | Release date |
|---|---|---|
| Instinct – Season One | 13 | December 11, 2018 |
