= Naveen Andrews =

British actor (born 1969)

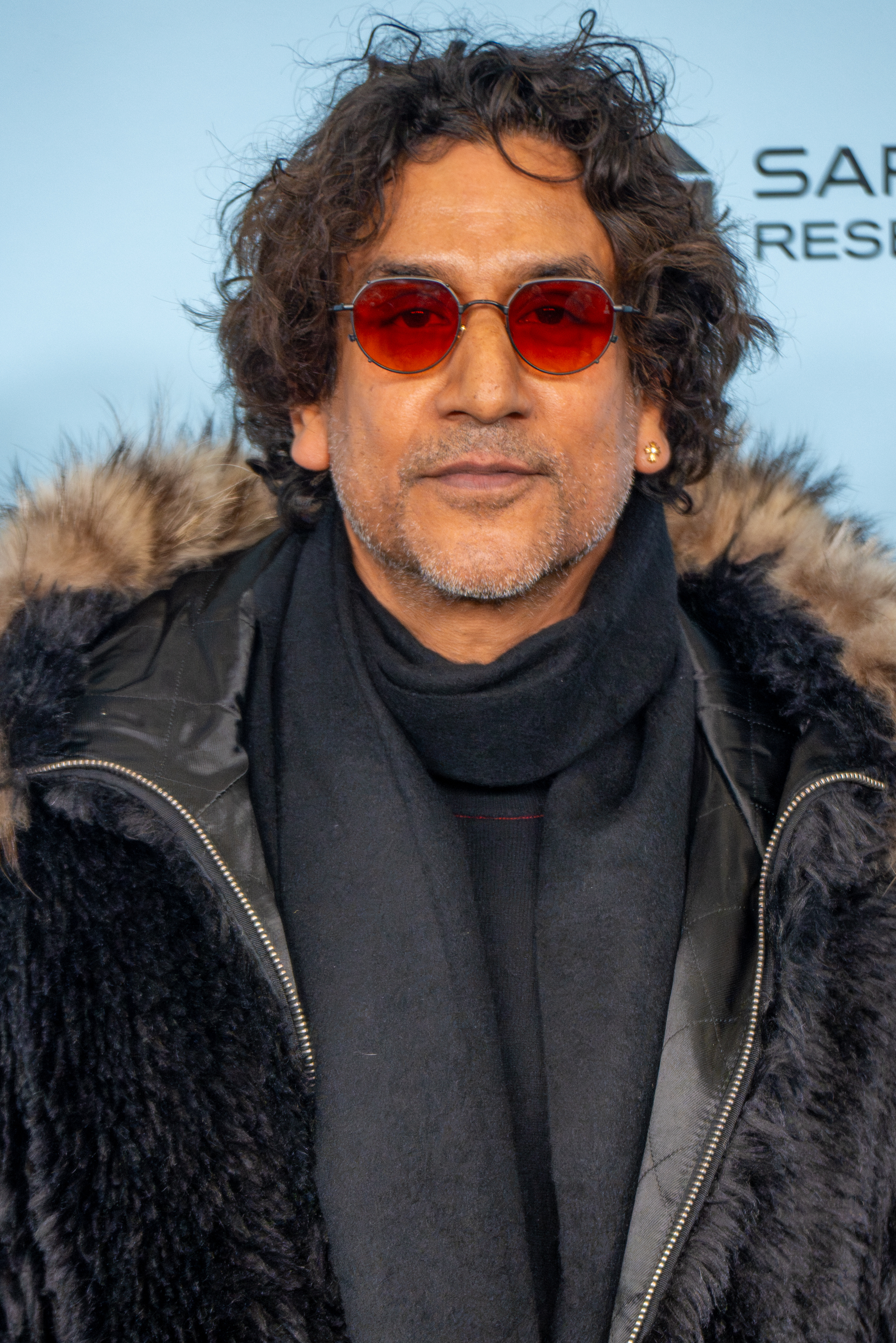
- Andrews in 2025
- Born: Naveen William Sidney Andrews; 17 January 1969 (age 57); London, England
- Citizenship: United Kingdom; United States (since 2010)
- Education: Guildhall School of Music and Drama (BA)
- Occupation: Actor
- Years active: 1991–present
- Partners: Geraldine Feakins (1985–1991); Barbara Hershey (1998–2009)
- Children: 2

Naveen William Sidney Andrews (born 17 January 1969) is a British and American actor. He is best known for his role as Sayid Jarrah in the television series Lost (2004–2010), for which he was nominated for a Golden Globe Award and a Primetime Emmy Award, as well as winning a Screen Actors Guild Award along with the cast. He has also appeared in films such as The English Patient (1996), Mighty Joe Young (1998), Rollerball (2002), Bride and Prejudice (2004), Planet Terror (2007), The Brave One (2007), and Diana (2013). In 2022, he portrayed Ramesh "Sunny" Balwani in the Hulu miniseries The Dropout.

== Early life ==
Andrews was born on 17 January 1969 in Lambeth, London, to Nirmala, a psychologist, and Stanley Andrews, a businessman, both immigrants from Kerala, India. He was raised in the Methodist Church of Great Britain. In 1985, when he was 16, Andrews began a relationship with the 30-year-old Geraldine Feakins.

== Career ==
Andrews graduated from the Emanuel School and moved up to the Guildhall School of Music and Drama for drama school. His studies paid off when he won a role in Hanif Kureishi's film London Kills Me (1991). Andrews starred in the 1993 BBC miniseries Buddha of Suburbia. He portrayed Kip Singh in The English Patient (1996), and Sayid Jarrah in the television series Lost (2004–10).

In 2006, he was voted one of People magazine's World's Most Beautiful People.

He starred in Kama Sutra: A Tale of Love (1996), Mighty Joe Young (1998), and Bride and Prejudice (2004). He has also appeared in films such as Rollerball (2002), Planet Terror (2007), The Brave One (2007), and Diana (2013).

He was Jafar in the American fantasy drama Once Upon a Time in Wonderland (2013–14). In 2014, he provided the voice of Sabal in the video game Far Cry 4. From 2015 to 2017, he starred in the series Sense8, (created by The Wachowskis and J. Michael Straczynski) as Jonas. From 2018 to 2019, he co-starred as ex-MI6 and CIA officer Julian Cousins in the series Instinct, alongside Alan Cumming and Bojana Novakovic. In 2022 Andrews co-starred with Amanda Seyfried as Theranos COO Sunny Balwani in the Hulu limited series The Dropout. In February 2025, it was announced that Andrews would voice the title role of Khan Noonien Singh in the scripted audio drama series Star Trek: Khan.

== Personal life ==
Andrews's relationship with Geraldine Feakins lasted from 1985 to 1991. Their son, Jaisal Andrews, was born in 1992. He was later in a relationship with actress Barbara Hershey in Los Angeles, starting in 1998. The couple separated briefly in 2005 and, during that time, Andrews had a son with Czech-French actress Elena Eustache. He and Hershey later reconciled, but in 2010, they announced that they had separated. Andrews was in a long custody dispute with Eustache over their son, and on 7 January 2009, he was granted sole legal and physical custody.

Andrews has spoken about his alcoholism and his two-year addiction to heroin in the mid-1990s. He has described an incident in which he collapsed on set and was treated by emergency services.

He plays guitar and sings, while tap dancing to his own tune as a hobby. He became a naturalised U.S. citizen on 27 May 2010.

== Filmography ==
=== Film ===
Key
†	Denotes films that have not yet been released

Year	Title	Role	Notes
1991	London Kills Me	Bike	
1992	Wild West	Zaf	
1992	Double Vision	Jimmy	
1996	Kama Sutra: A Tale of Love	Raj Singh	
1996	The English Patient	Kip Singh	
1997	True Love and Chaos	Hanif	
1998	Bombay Boys	Krishna	
1998	Mighty Joe Young	Pindi	
1999	Drowning on Dry Land	Darshan	
2000	A Question of Faith	William	
2002	Rollerball	Sanjay	
2003	Easy	John Kalicharan	
2004	Bride and Prejudice	Balraj	
2006	Provoked: A True Story	Deepak Ahluwalia	
2007	Grindhouse	Dr. John "Abby" Abbington	Segment: Planet Terror
2007	The Brave One	Dr. David Kirmani	
2008	Animals	Vic	
2013	Diana	Dr. Hasnat Khan	
2025	Last Days	Sonny	

=== Television ===
Year	Title	Role	Notes
1993	The Buddha of Suburbia	Karim Amir	4 episodes
1996	The Peacock Spring	Ravi Battacharya	Television film
1998	My Own Country	Dr. Abraham Verghese	Television film
2000	The Chippendales Murder	Steve Banerjee	Television film
2001	The Beast	Tamir Naipaul	Episode: "The Price"
2003	Future Tense	Miles Gupta	Unsold TV pilot
2004–2010	Lost	Sayid Jarrah	98 episodes
2006	The Ten Commandments	Menerith	Television film
2010	Law & Order: Special Victims Unit	Detective Ash Ramsey	Episode: "Shadow"
2012	Sinbad	Lord Akbari	7 episodes
2013–2014	Once Upon a Time in Wonderland	Jafar	13 episodes
2015–2018	Sense8	Jonas Maliki	18 episodes
2018–2019	Instinct	Julian Cousins	21 episodes
2022	The Dropout	Ramesh "Sunny" Balwani	8 episodes
2022	The Cleaning Lady	Robert Kamdar	5 episodes
2024	Last King of the Cross	Ray Kinnock	8 episodes
2024	The Pradeeps of Pittsburgh	Mahesh Pradeep	8 episodes

=== Video games ===
Year	Title	Role	Notes
2014	Far Cry 4	Sabal	

=== Audio ===
Year	Title	Role	Notes
2024	The Seneschal: A Rebel Moon Story	Grigory	Main role
2025	Star Trek: Khan	Khan Noonien Singh	Main role

== Awards and nominations ==
Year	Association	Category	Project	Result	Ref.
1996	Screen Actors Guild Award	Outstanding Cast in a Motion Picture	The English Patient	Nominated	
2005	Primetime Emmy Award	Outstanding Supporting Actor in a Drama Series	Lost	Nominated	
2006	Golden Globe Award	Best Supporting Actor - Television	Lost	Nominated	
2006	Screen Actors Guild Award	Outstanding Ensemble in a Drama Series	Lost	Won	
2022	Hollywood Critics Association	Best Supporting Actor in a Limited Series or Movie	The Dropout	Nominated	
