= Heather Kadin =

American executive producer

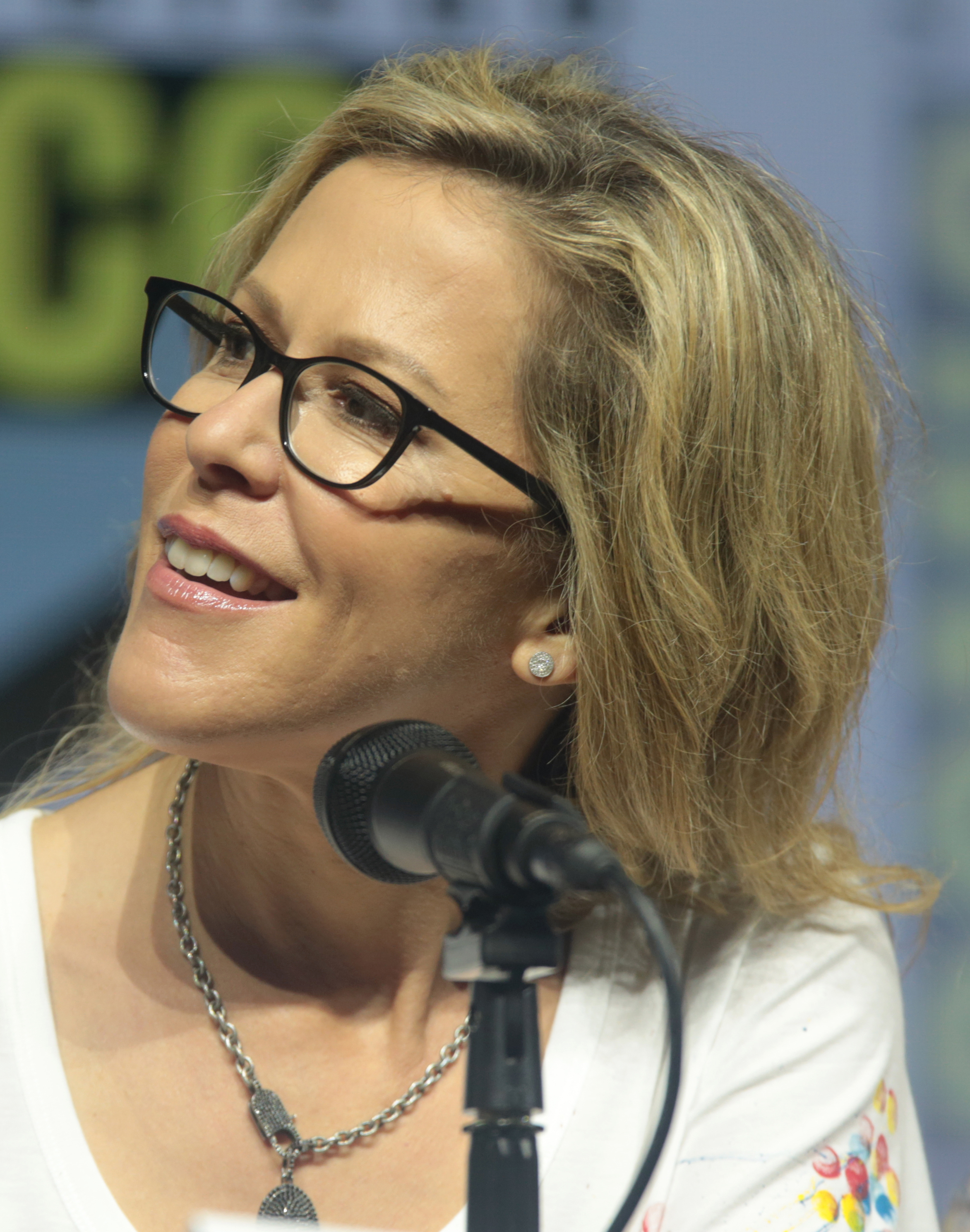
- Heather Kadin speaking at the 2018 San Diego Comic-Con.
- Born: August 7, 1972 (age 53); Scottsdale, Arizona, U.S.
- Occupations: President, Scripted Television, Range Media Partners; Producer; President, Television, Secret Hideout; President of Television K/O Paper Products
- Known for: Sleepy Hollow; Scorpion; Limitless; Star Trek: Discovery
- Children: 2

Heather Kadin (born August 7, 1972) is an American television producer and film producer. She co-executive produces Star Trek: Discovery.

== Life and career ==
What you haven't seen [in the trailer] is the show is a lot of fun. That's what you haven't gotten to see [yet]. What Jake [McDorman (Brian)] does, he's really funny, and brings a sense of fun to it…I think a big thing is the casting of Jake. Obviously we loved the movie, but Bradley's character, Eddie Morra, is kind of self-serving: he takes the drug, he writes this book, he becomes a stock broker, makes money, [sleeps with] women, and in a TV show, you're not going to root for that guy.

— Kadin, on Limitless (2015)

Kadin was born on August 7, 1972, in Scottsdale, Arizona. Before being President of the production company, K/O Paper Products, she was an executive producer at ABC. Kadin had previously worked with Alex Kurtzman and Roberto Orci together at ABC, where as a drama executive, was involved in J. J. Abrams' spy series Alias, on which Kurtzman and Orci were writer-producers since the first episode. For a brief time, before joining ABC, she had worked at the television division of Shady Acres Entertainment, which at that time, was based at Touchstone Television. She had left Warner Bros. Television where she served as vice president of drama development in 2010. Kadin worked with Kurtzman and Orci on the WBTV-produced Fringe, which Kurtzman and Orci co-created with Abrams.

Kadin served as executive producer of Sleepy Hollow (2013-2017), Matador (2014), Scorpion (2014-2018), and Limitless (2015-2016). She executive produced the TV movie Exit Strategy where she worked with David Guggenheim, Kurtzman, Orci, and director Antoine Fuqua in 2015. Kadin executive produced the TV movie Tales from the Darkside where she worked with Joe Hill and director Bradley Buecker in 2015.

Kadin worked as co-executive producer on Star Trek: Discovery (2017-2024) with Kurtzman for CBS. She also served as an Executive Producer on the short-lived CBS series Clarice in 2021.

== Personal life ==
She lives in Sherman Oaks, California with her husband and two sons.

== Filmography ==
=== Film credits ===
Year	Film	Credit	Notes
2015	Tales from the Darkside	Executive producer	Written by Joe Hill.; Directed by Bradley Buecker.
2015	Exit Strategy	Executive producer	Written by David Guggenheim, Alex Kurtzman, and Roberto Orci.; Directed by Antoine Fuqua.

=== Television credits ===
Year	TV Series	Credit	Notes
2013–17	Sleepy Hollow	Executive producer	Kurtzman, Orci, Len Wiseman, Clifton Campbell, Albert Kim, and Damian Kindler also executive produce the show.; Mark Goffman and Ken Olin executive produced the show. (seasons 1-2)
2014	Matador	Executive producer	Jay Beattie, Kurtzman, Orci, and Robert Rodriguez also executive produced the show.
2014–2018	Scorpion	Executive producer	Danielle Woodrow, Danny Rose, Scooter Braun, Walter O'Brien, Justin Lin, Nicholas Wootton, Nick Santora, Kurtzman, and Orci also executive produce the show.
2015–16	Limitless	Executive producer	Bradley Cooper, Todd Phillips, Ryan Kavanaugh, Tucker Tooley, Tom Forman, Marc Webb, Craig Sween, Kurtzman, and Orci also executive produce the show.
2017–present	Star Trek: Discovery	Executive producer	Kurtzman, Rod Roddenberry, and Trevor Roth also executive produce.
2018–2019	Instinct	Executive producer	Michael Rauch, Alex Kurtzman, James Patterson, Bill Robinson, Leopoldo Gout, Alan Cumming and Marc Webb also executive produce.
2020–2023	Star Trek: Picard	Executive producer	Rod Roddenberry, Trevor Roth, James Duff, Patrick Stewart, Akiva Goldsman and Michael Chabon also executive produce.
2020	The Comey Rule	Executive producer	Alex Kurtzman, Shane Salerno and Billy Ray also executive produce.
2020–present	Star Trek: Lower Decks	Executive producer	Alex Kurtzman, Rod Roddenberry, Trevor Roth, Katie Krentz and Mike McMahan also executive produce.
2021	Clarice	Executive producer	Elizabeth J.B. Klaviter, Jenny Lumet and Alex Kurtzman also executive produce.
2021-present	Star Trek: Prodigy	Executive producer	Alex Kurtzman, Rod Roddenberry, Dan Hageman, Kevin Hageman, Aaron Baiers, Katie Krentz, and Trevor Roth also executive produce.
2022-present	Star Trek: Strange New Worlds	Executive producer	Alex Kurtzman, Rod Roddenberry, Akiva Goldsman, Jenny Lumet, Henry Alonso Myers, Trevor Roth, Frank Siracusa, and John Weber also executive produce.
