= Rod Roddenberry =

American television producer

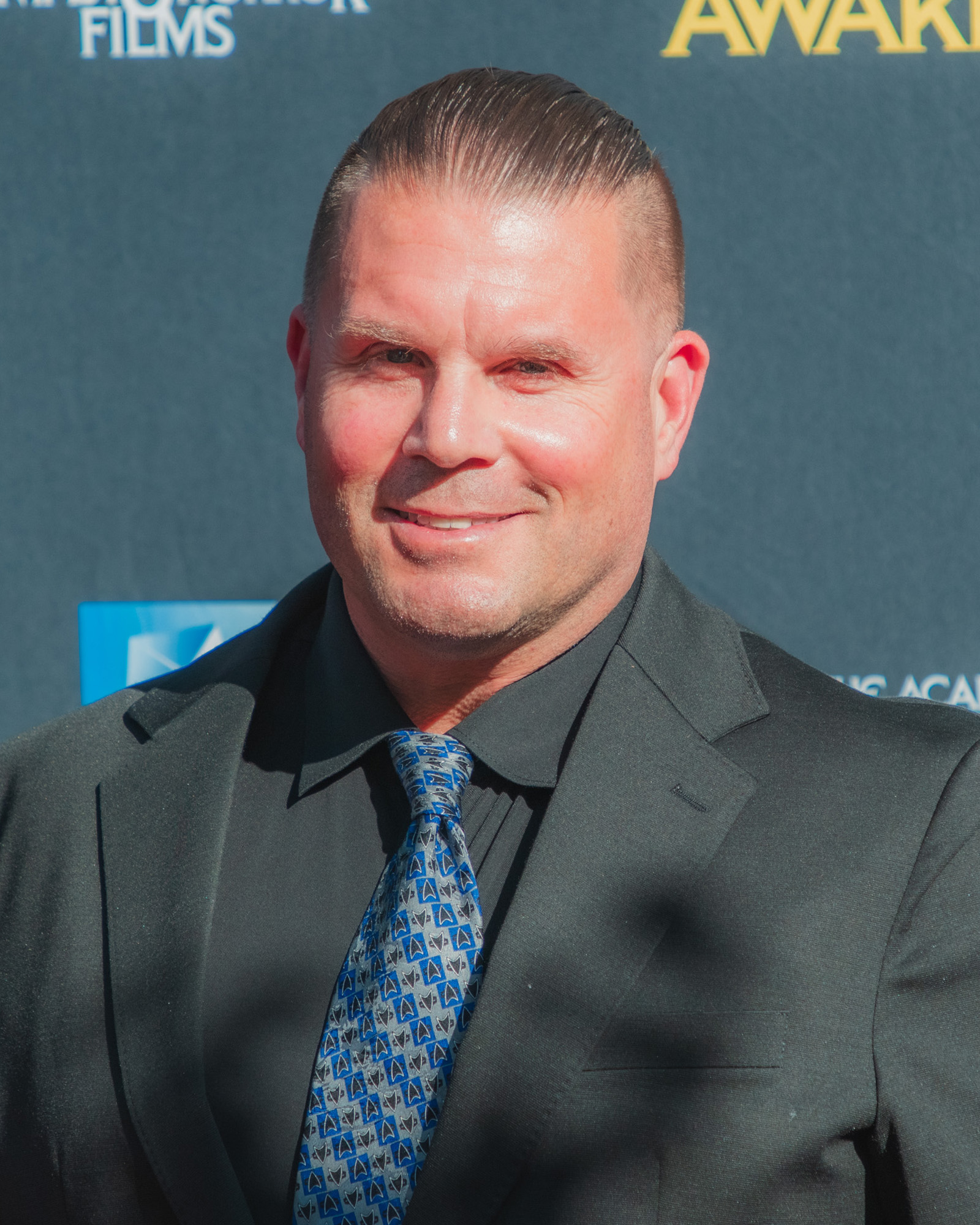
- Roddenberry in 2026
- Born: Eugene Wesley Roddenberry Jr. February 5, 1974 (age 52); Los Angeles, California, U.S.
- Education: Hampshire College
- Occupation: Television producer
- Spouse: Heidi Roddenberry (m. 2002)
- Children: 1
- Parents: Gene Roddenberry (father); Majel Barrett (mother)

Eugene Wesley "Rod" Roddenberry Jr. (born February 5, 1974) is an American television producer and the chief executive officer of Roddenberry Entertainment. He is the son of Star Trek creator Gene Roddenberry and Majel Barrett and is an executive producer on Star Trek: Discovery, Star Trek: Picard, Star Trek: Lower Decks, Star Trek: Prodigy, Star Trek: Strange New Worlds, Star Trek: Khan and Star Trek: Starfleet Academy.

== Early life ==
Roddenberry was born in Los Angeles the son of actress Majel Barrett and writer and producer Gene Roddenberry, creator of the American science fiction series Star Trek. Rod went to the John Thomas Dye School in Bel Air and Harvard-Westlake School in North Hollywood and attended Hampshire College in the early 1990s.

Rod Roddenberry was not familiar with Star Trek, having never even watched the show. In 1991, when he was 17 years old, his father died, after which he began to examine Star Trek and discover "what made the series special" to its fans. Rod struggled initially with his father's near-legendary stature among Star Trek fans, saying, "A son cannot identify with a mythical figure; my father was put up on this pedestal throughout my life." However, as he heard many moving stories about his father's flaws and follies, he observed, "That allowed me, as a son, not just to connect with him, but actually love him."

== Career ==
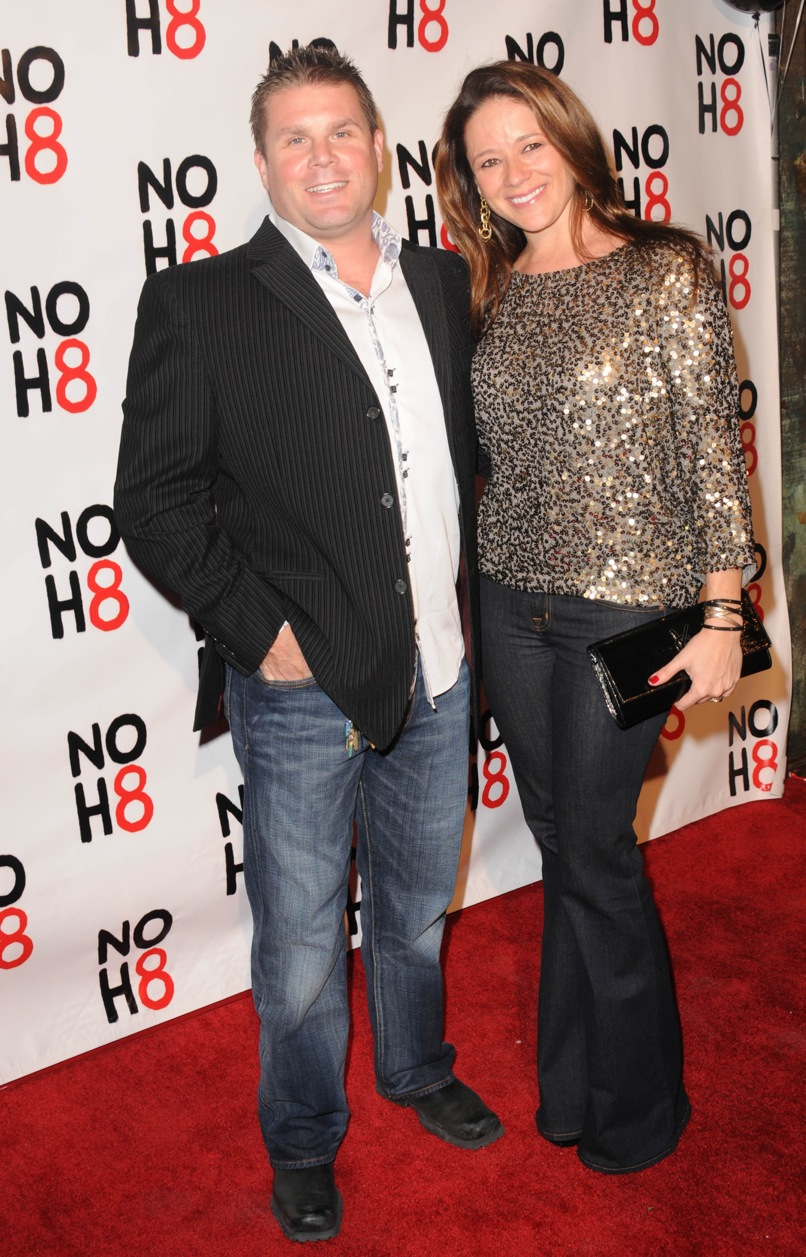
Roddenberry with his wife, Heidi

In 2001, Rod Roddenberry became chief executive officer of Roddenberry Entertainment, which builds upon his father's work, and develops multimedia science fiction properties including comics, television and film projects.

In mid-2009, the Los Angeles Times reported that Roddenberry approved of the 2009 Star Trek film by J.J Abrams. He opined that the producers and writers "made Star Trek cool again" with the film. In 2010 Roddenberry, an avid scuba diver since 1993, founded the Roddenberry Dive Team "to embark on undersea experiences and discover the diversity beneath the ocean." He leads the dive team in its exploration of underwater worlds and hopes to inspire stewardship of the world's oceans. He has a Divemaster certification, has led or participated in more than 1,000 dives from exotic locations around the world.

In October 2011, the Roddenberry Foundation, which was founded by Rod Roddenberry, made its largest gift of $5 million to the J. David Gladstone Institutes in San Francisco to establish the Roddenberry Center for Stem Cell Biology and Medicine. The Roddenberry Foundation believes that "the center's innovative technology that converts adult skin cells into life-changing stem cells will radically advance the fight against Alzheimer's and heart disease."

Roddenberry began being directly involved in the Star Trek franchise in 2016 when he signed on as an executive producer of the TV series Star Trek: Discovery.

== Filmography ==
| Year | Film/Series | Role | Notes |
|---|---|---|---|
| 1990 | Star Trek: The Next Generation | Production assistant | |
| 1997 | Earth: Final Conflict | Writer (technical advisor) | Produced through his production company, Roddenberry Entertainment |
| 2004–2011 | Star Trek: New Voyages | Consulting producer | Star Trek fan series |
| 2011 | Trek Nation | Producer and star | Documentary chronicling Roddenberry's exploration of his father's work. Includes interviews with fans, Star Trek alumni, and notable celebrities such as George Lucas, J. J. Abrams and Seth MacFarlane. |
| 2012 | White Room: 02B3 | Executive producer | A 15-minute, 360-degree narrative short film starring Breckin Meyer, Tamlyn Tomita, David Blue and Rachel True |
| 2017–2024 | Star Trek: Discovery | Executive producer | |
| 2018–2020 | Star Trek: Short Treks | Executive producer | |
| 2020–2023 | Star Trek: Picard | Executive producer | |
| 2020–2024 | Star Trek: Lower Decks | Executive producer | |
| 2021 | Star Trek: Prodigy | Executive producer | |
| 2022–present | Star Trek: Strange New Worlds | Executive producer | |
| 2022 | The Roddenberry Archive: The Cage | Executive producer | Documentary short series with interviews of surviving cast and crew from Star Trek's 1964 pilot episode "The Cage", featuring 3D and filmed recreations of the sets, characters, and events from Star Trek's history. |
| 2025 | Star Trek: Section 31 | Executive producer | |
| 2025 | Star Trek: Khan | Executive producer | |
| 2026–present | Star Trek: Starfleet Academy | Executive producer | |
