= Shadow (disambiguation) =

A shadow is a region of darkness where light is blocked.

Shadow, Shadows or The Shadow may also refer to:

== Places ==
- Shadow, Virginia, an unincorporated community in the US

== People ==
=== Surname ===
- M. Shadows (born 1981), lead singer for Avenged Sevenfold
- Mary Shadow (1925–1992), American politician from Tennessee

=== Nickname or stage name ===
- Norvell Austin (born 1958) or Shadow, professional wrestler
- Lance Hoyt (born 1977) or Shadow, professional wrestler
- DJ Shadow (born 1972), turntablist musician, producer, and songwriter
- Mighty Shadow (1941–2018), Trinidad calypsonian
- The Shadow (rapper) (born 1977), Israeli hip hop artist
- The Shadow, a professional wrestler from United States Wrestling Association
- Dorian Yates (born 1962) "The Shadow", former professional bodybuilder
- Black Shadow (wrestler), Mexican professional Lucha Libre wrestler
- Shadoe Stevens (born 1947), American radio host, voiceover actor, and television personality
- The Shadows, a former professional wrestling tag team with Jose Luis Rivera who later formed Los Conquistadores

== Arts, entertainment, and media ==
=== Art ===
- The Shadow (painting), a painting (c. 1909) by Edmund Blair Leighton

=== Fictional entities ===
- The Shadow, a character from pulp fiction, radio and movies
- Shadow (Final Fantasy), a character in the 1994 video game Final Fantasy VI
- Shadow the Hedgehog, video game character
- Shadow, video game character; see characters of the Devil May Cry series
- Shadows, TV series characters; see civilizations in Babylon 5
- Shadow, role-playing game character; see list of Advanced Dungeons & Dragons 2nd edition monsters
- Shadow, the main character in American Gods
- Shadow, a character in Homeward Bound: The Incredible Journey
- Shadow, a character in Bear in the Big Blue House
- Shadow, a cybernetic and darkened version of Charlie Nash from Marvel Super Heroes vs. Street Fighter
- Shadow, a villain from the 1995s show Juukou B-Fighter
- Shadow, the most common form of the Heartless from Kingdom Hearts
- Shadow, the main character in Cyber Shadow
- Shadow and Gasher, a villain from the 1986 TV series Jikuu Senshi Spielban
- Shadow, also known as 'Blinky', one of the four antagonists in the video game Pac-Man
- Shadow Geist, a character from the game Street Fighter EX2
- Shadow Man, a ninja boss from the game Mega Man 3
- Shadow Prove, a villain from anime series Bakugan: New Vestroia
- The Shadow, the personification of Death in The Demonata
- The Shadow, a being dark controls the Empty, existed before God or the Darkness from the 2005 TV series Supernatural
- The Shadow, a nightmare entity breaking down reality from Amnesia: The Dark Descent
- Shadows, suppressed human thoughts given physical form, according to the Persona series

=== Films ===
- Shadows (1916 film), a film by B. Reeves Eason
- Shadows (1919 film), a film by Reginald Barker
- The Shadow (1920 film), an Italian silent film
- Shadows (1922 film), a film starring Lon Chaney, Sr.
- Shadows (1931 film), a British film
- The Shadow (1933 film), a film starring Felix Aylmer
- The Shadow (1937 film), a film starring Rita Hayworth
- The Shadow (serial), the ninth serial released by Columbia Pictures, in 1940
- The Shadow (1948 film), a French film directed by André Berthomieu
- The Shadow (1953 film), a Swedish film starring Eva Dahlbeck
- The Shadow (1954 film), a film starring Märta Torén
- Shadow (1956 film), a 1956 film by Jerzy Kawalerowicz
- Shadows (1959 film), a film by John Cassavetes
- Shadow (1971 film), a Soviet film by Nadezhda Kosheverova
- The Shadow (1994 film), a film by Russell Mulcahy, starring Alec Baldwin, based on the pulp magazine/radio character
- Webmaster (film), a 1998 film also known as The Shadow
- Shadows (2007 film), a film by Milčo Mančevski
- Shadow (2009 Hindi film), a film starring Nasser Khan
- Shadow (2009 Italian film), a horror film directed by Federico Zampaglione
- Shadow (2013 film), a Telugu film by Meher Ramesh
- Shadow (2018 film), a Chinese film by Zhang Yimou
- Shadows (2020 film), an Italian thriller by Carlo Lavagna
- Shadow (2022 film), an Australian film directed by Bruce Gladwin adapting a production by Back to Back Theatre
- The Shadow (unreleased film), a Russian film by Dmitriy Svetozarov, originally scheduled for release in 2017

=== Games ===
- The Shadow (pinball), a 1994 pinball game based on the 1994 film
- The Shadow (video game), a cancelled game based on the 1994 film
- Shadow the Hedgehog (video game), a 2005 game of the Sonic the Hedgehog series
- Assassin's Creed Shadows, a 2025 game of the Assassin's Creed series

=== Literature ===
==== The Shadow franchise ====
- The Shadow, the pulp fiction series from 1930s on (also a radio show and movie serials)
- The Shadow (magazine), the magazine in which the pulp fiction character appeared

==== Novels ====
- The Shadow (Spanish: La Sombra), an 1871 novel by Benito Pérez Galdós
- The Shadow: A Story of the Evolution of a Soul, a 1911 novel by Harold Begbie
- The Shadow, a 1913 novel by Arthur Stringer
- The Shadow, a 1920 novel by Mary White Ovington
- The Shadow, a 1922 novel by Henry Bedford-Jones
- Shadow: A Christmas Story, a 1920 book by Harry Stillwell Edwards
- The Shadow and Other Stories, a 1929 book by Jeffery Farnol
- The Shadow, a 1934 novel by Gerald Verner under the pseudonym Donald Stuart
- The Shadow, a 1936 novel by E. H. Visiak
- The Shadow, a 1948 novel by Neil M. Gunn
- Shadows, a 1951 novel by Winifred Duke
- Shadows, a 1970 novel by Victor J. Banis under the pseudonym Jan Alexander
- Shadows, a 1975 novel by Edwin Corley
- Shadow (Brown book), a 1982 book that won a Caldecott Medal for illustrator Marcia Brown
- Shadows, a 1985 novel by Shaun Hutson
- Shadows, a 1986 novel by Vanessa Grant
- Shadows, a 1987 novel by Douglas Scott
- Shadow, a 1987 novel by Dave Duncan
- Shadow, a 1991 novel by Anne Logston, the inaugural installment in the Shadow series
- Shadows, a 1992 novel by John Saul
- The Shadow, a novelization of the 1994 film by James Luceno
- The Shadow, a junior novelization of the 1994 film by Les Martin
- Shadows, a 1996 novel by Kenneth Royce
- Shadow (Woodward book), 1999, by Bob Woodward
- Shadows (novel), a 1999 novel by Tim Bowler
- Shadow (Star Trek), a 2001 Star Trek novel by Dean Wesley Smith and Kristine Kathryn Rush, the fourth installment in the Sector 31 series
- Shadow, a 2001 novel by K. J. Parker, the first installment in the Scavenger trilogy

==== Short stories ====
- "The Shadow" (fairy tale), an 1847 fairy tale by Hans Christian Andersen
- The Shadows (fairy tale), a fairy tale by George MacDonald
- "The Shadows", a 1927 short story by Henry S. Whitehead
- "The Shadows", a 1952 short story by Leigh Brackett
- Shadows (anthology), a 1978–1981 series of horror anthologies edited by Charles L. Grant and published by Doubleday

==== Other literature ====
- Book of Shadows, a book containing instructions for magical rituals
- The Shadow; A Play in Three Acts, a 1913 play by Eden Phillpotts

=== Music ===
==== Groups ====
- Shadow (group), a late '70s funk and soul group, a spin-off from The Ohio Players
- The Shadows (Nepalese band), a rock band from Nepal
- The Shadows, a British guitar-based instrumental group who were also accompanists for Cliff Richard

==== Albums ====
- Shadows (Gordon Lightfoot album), 1982
- Shadows (David Benoit album), 1991
- Shadows (Gary Bartz album), 1992
- Shadows (Creepmime album), 1993
- Shadows (Spy Glass Blue album), 1996
- Shadows (Wagon Christ album), 2004
- Shadows (Lynch album), 2009
- Shadows (Teenage Fanclub album), 2010
- Shadows (In the Midst of Lions album), 2011
- Shadows (Lenka album), 2013
- Shadows (Rachael Leahcar album), 2017
- The Shadow (album), a 1990 album by Ketil Bjørnstad
- The Shadow, the second album of rock band Naked Giants
- The Shadows (album), a 1961 album by The Shadows
- The Shadows (EP), a 1961 EP by The Shadows

==== Songs ====
- "Shadow" (Ashlee Simpson song), 2004
- "Shadow" (Alexandra Burke song), 2018
- "Shadows" (Sunny Day Real Estate song)
- "Shadows" (The Getaway Plan song)
- "Shadows" (Warpaint song), 2011
- "Shadow" (Macklemore song), 2019
- "Shadow", 2013 song by f(x) from Pink Tape
- "Shadows, 2005 song by Breed 77 from Breed 77
- "Shadows", by A. J. McLean from Have It All
- "Shadow", by AB6IX from 6ixense
- "Shadows", by The Afters from Live On Forever
- "Shadow", by Austin Mahone from The Secret
- "Shadow", by Bleachers from Strange Desire
- "Shadows", by Breathe Carolina from Savages
- "Shadow", by Britney Spears from In the Zone
- "Shadow", by Carly Rae Jepsen from The Loveliest Time
- "Shadows", by Childish Gambino from Because the Internet
- "Shadow", by Chromatics from Twin Peaks: Music from the Limited Event Series
- "Shadow", by Davichi from Innocence
- "Shadows", by Deep Purple from Shades of Deep Purple
- "Shadows", by Dev from The Night the Sun Came Up
- "The Shadow", by Devo from Total Devo
- "Shadows", by Eric Prydz
- "Shadows", by From Ashes to New from Day One
- "Shadows", by God Is an Astronaut from their self-titled album
- "Shadow", by Haste the Day from Coward
- "Shadow", by Immanuel Wilkins from The 7th Hand
- "Shadows", by Joe Walsh from You Bought It – You Name It
- "Shadow", by Kesha from High Road
- "Shadows", by Lindsey Stirling
- "Shadow", by Neurosis from Given to the Rising
- "Shadows", by New Trolls
- "Shadows", by Nidji from Top Up
- "Shadow", by Nonpoint from Miracle
- "The Shadow", by The Prodigy
- "Shadows", by Red from Innocence & Instinct
- "Shadows", by Red Fang from Only Ghosts
- "Shadows", by Red House Painters from Ocean Beach
- "Shadows", by Renegade Five
- "Shadows", by Rufus Wainwright from Poses
- "Shadow", by Ryan Adams from the self-titled album
- "Shadows", by Sabrina Carpenter from Evolution
- "Shadows", by Sampa the Great from As Above, So Below
- "Shadow", by Taemin from Want
- "The Shadow", by Timothy B. Schmit from Feed the Fire
- "Shadow", by Twice from More & More
- "Shadow", by Vildhjarta from Måsstaden
- "Shadows", by Westlife from Where We Are
- "Shadows", by Wire from Mind Hive
- "Shadows", by Wolves at the Gate from Eulogies
- "Shadows", by X Ambassadors from Orion

==== Venues ====
- The Shadows in Washington DC, a renowned music club also known as The Cellar Door from 1964 to 1981

==== Other uses in music ====
- Shadows (Sallinen), an orchestral prelude by Aulis Sallinen
- The Shadow (underground newspaper), New York City, NY

=== Radio and television ===
==== Episodes ====
- "Shadows" (The X-Files), television series episode
- "Shadows" (Agents of S.H.I.E.L.D.), television series episode
- "Shadow", episode of television series Buffy the Vampire Slayer season 5
- "Shadow", 1995 episode of JAG season 1
- "Shadow", episode of television series Supernatural season 1
- "Shadows", episode of the television series Voltron: Legendary Defender
- "Shadow," episode of television series Blake's 7
- "Shadows", episode of Highlander: The Series season 3
- "Shadows", an episode of the television series Teletubbies

==== Other uses in radio and television ====
- Shadow, a television ident for BBC Two, from the 1991–2001 series
- Shadows (TV series), a 1970s British supernatural television drama series aimed at older children
- Shadow (TV series), a 2019 South African television drama

== Science and technology ==
- Shadow (mathematics), a concept in the theory of hyperreal numbers
- Shadow (OS/2), an OS/2 file linking strategy
- Shadows (software), a software package for designing sundials and astrolabes
- Acoustic shadow, acoustical phenomenon caused by an object placed in front of a source of sound
- Shadow mapping, a process to add shadows to 3D computer graphics
- Shadow memory, a technique used to track and store information on computer memory used by a program during its execution
- Shadow paging, a technique for providing atomicity and durability in database systems
- Shadow password (Unix' /etc/shadow)
- Shadow tables, objects in computer science used to improve the way machines, networks and programs handle information
- The Shadow, a Spirit DataCine without a Kodak front-end optics and CCD

== Sports ==
- Shadow Racing Cars, former Formula One and CanAm racing team of Don Nichols and Jackie Oliver
- The Shadows, professional wrestling tag-team, predecessor of Los Conquistadores

== Transport ==
- Shadow (motorbike), a Honda motorcycle
- AAI RQ-7 Shadow, an unmanned aerial vehicle (UAV) used by the US Army
- Back Bone Shadow, a French paramotor design
- Dodge Shadow, a Chrysler Corporation automobile
- Vortech Shadow, an American autogyro rotorcraft design

== Other uses ==
- Shadow (psychology), a part of the unconscious mind consisting of repressed personality traits
- Job shadow, an educational temporary work experience following someone else in their workplace
- Shadow Cabinet, members of the parliamentary opposition party
- USS Shadow III (SP-102), a US Navy patrol boat in commission from 1917 to 1919
- Shadow Inc., a technology company that gained attention after their IowaReporterApp software failed during the 2020 Iowa Democratic caucuses
- Shadow.tech, a cloud computing service
- The Shadows (podcast), 2018 podcast created by Kaitlin Prest and produced by the CBC
- Shadow House, a plantation house in Louisiana
- Shadow, a bald eagle in California

== See also ==
- Shadda, an Arabic diacritic mark
- Shado (disambiguation)
- Shadow Lake (disambiguation)
- Shadowing (disambiguation)
- Shadowman (disambiguation)
- Shatto (disambiguation)
