= Hetrick =

Hetrick is a surname. Notable people with the surname include:

- Emery Hetrick (1931–1987), American psychiatrist
- Glenn Hetrick (born 1972), actor and special effects makeup artist/designer from Pennsylvania
- Jennifer Hetrick (born 1958), American actress
- John W. Hetrick (1918–1999), American engineer credited for inventing the airbag
- Keith Hetrick (born 1988), American songwriter and record producer
- Michele Hetrick, American make-up artist
- Robert Hetrick (1769–1849), poet and blacksmith from Dalmellington, Ayrshire, Scotland
- W. Brady Hetrick (1907–1999), former Democratic member of the Pennsylvania House of Representatives

== See also ==
- Hetrick-Martin Institute, New York City based non-profit organization devoted to LGBTQ youth
- HTRK
