= Star Trek: Discovery season 3 =

Star Trek: Discovery
- Season 3
- Promotional poster
- Showrunners: Alex Kurtzman; Michelle Paradise
- Starring: Sonequa Martin-Green; Doug Jones; Anthony Rapp; Mary Wiseman; David Ajala; Wilson Cruz; Rachael Ancheril
- No. of episodes: 13

Release
- Original network: CBS All Access
- Original release: October 15, 2020 – January 7, 2021

Season chronology
- ← Previous; Season 2 Next → Season 4

The third season of the American television series Star Trek: Discovery follows the crew of the starship Discovery as they travel to the 32nd century, more than 900 years after Star Trek: The Original Series, and learn that Starfleet has nearly been destroyed by a cataclysmic event called "The Burn" that has left the galaxy disconnected. The season was produced by CBS Television Studios in association with Secret Hideout and Roddenberry Entertainment, with Alex Kurtzman and Michelle Paradise serving as showrunners.

Sonequa Martin-Green stars as Michael Burnham, first officer of the Discovery, along with the returning Doug Jones, Anthony Rapp, Mary Wiseman, and Wilson Cruz. They are joined by David Ajala and Rachael Ancheril. The season was ordered in February 2019, with Paradise promoted to co-showrunner alongside series co-creator Kurtzman. They ended the second season with the Discovery travelling to the future, beyond existing Star Trek continuity, which allowed them to explore a new time period for the franchise including new designs and technology from production designer Phillip Barker. The season introduces the first explicitly non-binary and transgender Star Trek characters, respectively portrayed by recurring guests Blu del Barrio and Ian Alexander. Filming took place from July 2019 to February 2020 in Toronto, Canada, and on location in Iceland. Star Trek: Discovery was the first visual effects-heavy series to go through post-production during the COVID-19 pandemic, with work on the season's visual effects, as well as editing and music, taking place remotely.

The 13-episode season premiered on the streaming service CBS All Access on October 15, 2020, and concluded on January 7, 2021. It was estimated to be the most in-demand All Access series of 2020, and received positive reviews for its new setting which critics felt had freed the series from the franchise's existing continuity and allowed it to tell the story it was meant to tell. Other praise went to the season's real-world parallels and cast (especially Martin-Green, as well as the introduction of Ajala, del Barrio, and Alexander), while Burnham's character development and the resolution of major issues received mixed responses. It won a Primetime Creative Arts Emmy Award for its visual effects, and received several other awards and nominations. A fourth season was announced in October 2020, and the third season also sets-up a planned spin-off film to star recurring guest Michelle Yeoh.

== Episodes ==
No. overall	No. in season	Title	Directed by	Written by	Original release date
30	1	"That Hope Is You, Part 1"	Olatunde Osunsanmi	Michelle Paradise & Jenny Lumet & Alex Kurtzman	October 15, 2020
After traveling to the future to protect the intelligent Sphere data from Control, a rogue artificial intelligence destined to destroy all sentient life, Michael Burnham arrives in the year 3188 and learns that she was successful—life exists in this future. Burnham crashes into the ship of Cleveland "Book" Booker, a courier transporting stolen cargo. He explains that in an event called "The Burn", most of the galaxy's dilithium (the element used by starships to travel at warp speeds) exploded, destroying many starships including most of Starfleet. Now the quadrant is disconnected and is no longer governed by the United Federation of Planets. Burnham helps Book protect his cargo, an endangered trance worm that he is taking to a sanctuary, from other couriers. In exchange, Book takes her to a seemingly abandoned Federation space station where they find Aditya Sahil, a "Federation liaison" waiting in the hope that a Starfleet officer would come to the station one day. Burnham gives him an acting Starfleet commission. Sahil is unable to locate the USS Discovery, which was traveling to the future with Burnham.
31	2	"Far from Home"	Olatunde Osunsanmi	Michelle Paradise & Jenny Lumet & Alex Kurtzman	October 22, 2020
The USS Discovery crash-lands on a glacier. The ship is damaged and crewmembers are wounded, including helm officer Keyla Detmer. Acting captain Saru decides to repair the ship before exploring the outside world, but they learn that they are missing resources that they require to complete the repairs. Saru and ensign Silvia Tilly go to a nearby settlement to get the resources they need and find a group of poor miners being oppressed by a courier named Zareh. The miners use programmable matter to help Discovery in exchange for some of the ship's dilithium, which would allow them to leave the planet and escape Zareh. However, Zareh arrives and attacks the group, killing one of the miners and planning to take all of Discovery's dilithium. He is stopped when Phillipa Georgiou—the former Emperor of the Mirror Universe's Terran Empire and now Starfleet agent—overpowers Zareh and his men. The crew return to Discovery with the resources they need, but the glacier's parasitic ice has encased the ship and it is unable to take off until Burnham arrives and frees them with Book's ship.
32	3	"People of Earth"	Jonathan Frakes	Bo Yeon Kim & Erika Lippoldt	October 29, 2020
With Sahil not able to locate the Discovery in 3188, Burnham becomes a courier and works with Book, searching for clues about the fate of the Federation. She finds a transmission from Admiral Senna Tal from Earth, but they are unable to travel there with their limited dilithium. After a year, Discovery arrives in the future and Burnham finds them in the glacier. Saru becomes the new captain, and Discovery's dilithium is stored on Book's cloaked ship, which he parks in their docking bay, for safety. Using Discovery's advanced spore drive, they travel to Earth and find it no longer part of the Federation. Investigators from the United Earth Defense Force board Discovery and explain that Tal is dead. They are all attacked by dilithium bandits who the EDF attempt to destroy until Burnham and Book trick the bandits, capturing their leader Wen. In negotiations between Wen and EDF Captain Ndoye, the two sides realize that they can help each other and prevent further fighting. A young human investigator named Adira is identified as the host of Tal's Trill symbiont and is connected to his memories.
33	4	"Forget Me Not"	Hanelle M. Culpepper	Alan McElroy & Chris Silvestri & Anthony Maranville	November 5, 2020
As a human host to a Trill symbiont, Adira cannot remember becoming the host of the Tal symbiont, and cannot access the memories of previous hosts such as Senna. Burnham takes them to the Trill homeworld in hopes that the Trill can help unlock their memories. The Trill are also no longer part of the Federation, but welcome Discovery due to their need for new symbiont hosts. However, many Trill refuse to believe that a non-Trill could host a symbiont, and Adira is turned away. A group of Trill attempt to kill Adira and take the symbiont, but Burnham stops them and a friendly Trill, Guardian Xi, offers to help. At the sacred Caves of Mak'ala, Xi and Burnham help Adira connect to Tal's memories: when Senna died, Tal was transferred to Gray, Adira's Trill boyfriend. However, Gray was killed shortly thereafter and Adira offered to become the new host to save Tal and the memories of all previous hosts. After gaining access to Tal's memories, Adira is able to communicate with Gray's consciousness. Meanwhile, Saru attempts to improve crew morale with the help of Dr. Hugh Culber.
34	5	"Die Trying"	Maja Vrvilo	Teleplay by : Sean Cochran; Story by : James Duff & Sean Cochran	November 12, 2020
Using Senna's memories, Adira guides Discovery to Starfleet headquarters. Starfleet Commander-in-Chief Charles Vance asks for Burnham, Saru, and Adira to beam over to the base, where Adira is taken away for medical testing. Vance informs Saru and Burnham that the crew will be interrogated and reassigned while their ship is studied, which Saru agrees to in hopes of earning the trust of Starfleet. Realizing that Starfleet is dealing with a health crisis that could be solved through the seed archives aboard the USS Tikhov, Burnham receives approval from Vance to take the Discovery crew there with the spore drive and retrieve the seeds. They find the occupants of the Tikhov dead except for a man who is fatally injured. He is the same species as security officer Nhan, who decides to remain with the Tikhov to ensure he and his family receive a proper burial. Discovery returns to Starfleet with the seeds, and an antidote for the health crisis is synthesized. Due to this success, Vance agrees that the Discovery crew may remain together but insists that they answer to him.
35	6	"Scavengers"	Douglas Aarniokoski	Anne Cofell Saunders	November 19, 2020
The Discovery is upgraded to utilize 32nd-century technology, including programmable matter. Vance sends other Starfleet ships on various missions across the remaining Federation space, but orders Discovery to remain at the ready for any rapid-response missions. Book's ship arrives unmanned and carrying a three-week-old message from him about a new discovery he has made: the black box for a Starfleet ship that was destroyed in the Burn. Burnham believes that she can use this black box to trace the origin of the Burn, but Saru orders her to remain on the Discovery in case Vance needs them. Burnham agrees, but then disobeys Saru's order by taking Georgiou in Book's ship to go find him. On the salvage planet Hunhau, Georgiou poses as a buyer looking for rare ship pieces while Burnham looks for Book. They stage a prison break for the servants working at the salvage yards, allowing their escape with Book and the black box. When they return, Burnham is reprimanded by Vance for disobeying orders and Saru demotes Burnham from her position as his first officer.
36	7	"Unification III"	Jon Dudkowski	Kirsten Beyer	November 26, 2020
After studying several black boxes, Burnham believes she can find the source of the Burn with data from Project SB-19, a possible space travel alternative to dilithium developed by the unified Vulcan and Romulan people on Ni'Var (formerly the planet Vulcan). The Ni'Varians believe SB-19 caused the Burn and do not want to give the data to the Federation, whom they have left. Vance believes Burnham can convince the Ni'Varians otherwise since her brother, Spock, had begun the process of unifying the Vulcans and Romulans hundreds of years earlier. At Ni'Var, Burnham invokes T'Kal-in-ket, a Vulcan trial intended to verify her scientific claim to the SB-19 data. She is represented by her mother Gabrielle, who was previously trapped in the future and has since joined the Qowat Milat, a sect of Romulan warrior nuns. Gabrielle makes Burnham confront her own intentions and sense of confusion about her destiny, leading to Burnham withdrawing from the trial. Impressed by this, Ni'Var President T'Rina gives Burnham the SB-19 data. Meanwhile, Saru names Tilly as his acting first officer.
37	8	"The Sanctuary"	Jonathan Frakes	Kenneth Lin & Brandon Schultz	December 3, 2020
Book receives a distress signal from his brother Kyheem, who says their home planet Kwejian is being threatened by the Emerald Chain, a syndicate of Andorians and Orions led by Osyraa. Kwejian's harvests have been devastated by locusts following climate changes caused by the Burn, and Kyheem made a deal with Osyraa to repel the locusts in exchange for giving her access to Kwejian's trance worms. This caused a rift between Book, who wanted to protect the worms, and his brother. Civilizations that receive help from the Emerald Chain often collapse, so Discovery is allowed to travel to Kwejian. Kyheem reveals to Book and Burnham that Osyraa wants Ryn, an Andorian servant that was freed in their prison break on Hunhau. Kyheem agrees to disobey Osyraa in exchange for Discovery and the Federation helping to repel the locusts. Discovery keeps Osyraa from taking Ryn by attacking her with Book's ship, but she sees through the ruse and promises retaliation against the Federation before retreating. Meanwhile, Georgiou appears to be ill and is experiencing blackouts and flashbacks.
38	9	"Terra Firma"	Omar Madha	Teleplay by : Alan McElroy; Story by : Bo Yeon Kim & Erika Lippoldt & Alan McElroy	December 10, 2020
39	10	"Terra Firma"	Chloe Domont	Teleplay by : Kalinda Vazquez; Written by : Bo Yeon Kim & Erika Lippoldt & Alan McElroy	December 17, 2020
Part 1: After studying Georgiou's condition, Culber is visited by Dr. Kovich, a mysterious Starfleet operative, who explains that since Georgiou has both traveled through time and from a different universe, her molecules have moved too far from their origin and she is now likely to die. Consulting with Discovery's computer, which has been augmented with the intelligent Sphere data, Culber believes that Georgiou could be saved by traveling to an uninhabited planet, Dannus V. Stamets and Adira use the SB-19 data to trace the source of the Burn to the Verubin Nebula, and discover a distress signal from a Kelpien starship. On Dannus V, Georgiou and Burnham encounter a strange being named Carl who directs Georgiou to a door. On the other side, she finds herself back in the Mirror Universe during the time she was Emperor. Georgiou finds that her time with Discovery has made her a better person than she was then, and she decides to use her knowledge of the past to alter certain events, including rescuing the slave Saru and sparing the life of the treacherous Michael Burnham. Part 2: Georgiou hopes to lead an improved Terran Empire with Burnham by her side, and has the latter tortured until she pledges her allegiance. Georgiou reveals to Saru that the Kelpien biological change known as Vahar'ai does not mean it is time for him to be culled; rather, it is a natural process that will make him stronger if he allows it to happen. Burnham and Georgiou work together to hunt Burnham's former lover Gabriel Lorca, but this is a ruse and Burnham soon turns on Georgiou. After a fight, Georgiou kills Burnham before dying herself in Saru's arms. She then returns to Dannus V, where Carl reveals himself to be the Guardian of Forever. He explains that he can send Georgiou to another time and place where she will survive, but he had to test her first and was happy to see her attempt to change the fate of the Terran Empire. Georgiou says goodbye to Burnham before traveling through the Guardian's portal. On Discovery, Book wishes to prove his worth to the crew and uses Emerald Chain technology to help them connect to the computer systems of the Kelpien starship in the Verubin Nebula.
40	11	"Su'Kal"	Norma Bailey	Anne Cofell Saunders	December 24, 2020
Discovery detects a life sign on the starship in the radioactive Verubin Nebula, and Saru suggests this could be the child of one of the starship's scientists. They jump there to investigate, and find a planet made primarily of dilithium inside the nebula. Saru, Burnham, and Culber transport to the planet, leaving Tilly in command of Discovery. On the planet, the away team find themselves inside a complex holographic simulation designed by the scientists to raise and protect the child. They find the child, Su'Kal, and discover that he was born with biology adapted to the planet and radioactive nebula, while the away team suffers from radiation poisoning. Su'Kal is not prepared to deal with reality outside the simulation, and when he becomes upset he creates an energy surge similar to the Burn. An Emerald Chain ship commanded by Osyraa arrives. Book flies into the nebula to retrieve the away team and is able to get Burnham, but the others, plus a stowaway Adira, stay with Su'Kal. Osyraa captures Discovery and forces it to jump to Federation headquarters.
41	12	"There Is a Tide..."	Jonathan Frakes	Kenneth Lin	December 31, 2020
Osyraa poses as an under-attack Discovery with blocked communications, and Vance decides to let the ship through the Federation's shields. Burnham and Book use the courier's perilous transwarp network to reach Federation headquarters in time to crash land on Discovery before the shields close. Osyraa sends Zareh to investigate and he captures Book, while Burnham escapes unseen. Book is kept hostage with the bridge crew and Ryn, Stamets is interrogated by scientist Aurellio who plans to replicate Discovery's spore drive, and the rest of Discovery's crew is released from the ship in shuttles. Osyraa proposes a peace treaty between the Federation and the Emerald Chain to Vance. He considers the treaty but insists that Osyraa stand trial for her crimes against the Federation, which is unacceptable to her. The bridge crew escapes with the help of Book and Ryn, who are captured again. Burnham frees Stamets and safely jettisons him from the ship to prevent his capture, despite his wish to use the spore drive to immediately save Culber, Adira, and Saru. Aurellio is horrified when Osyraa kills Ryn.
42	13	"That Hope Is You, Part 2"	Olatunde Osunsanmi	Michelle Paradise	January 7, 2021
Unable to jump away without Stamets, Osyraa fights her way out of Federation headquarters and shuts off life support for the bridge crew. Despite this, Tilly and the bridge crew are able to plant a bomb in one of the ship's nacelles with the help of the Sphere data, dropping Discovery from warp. Burnham makes her way to the ship's data core, kills Osyraa in a fight, and resets the computer systems. She turns life support back on and beams all of the Emerald Chain fighters off the ship. Aurellio, after a change of heart, suggests that Book could use the spore drive with the empathic abilities his species has, and they jump to the nebula. Saru helps Su'Kal turn the simulation off and come to terms with the death of his mother, as his reaction to that is what caused the Burn, just as Discovery arrives. Saru decides to help Su'Kal start a new life on Kaminar, and Burnham is promoted to captain. The Emerald Chain collapses after Osyraa's death, and planets begin to rejoin the Federation. Discovery sets out to bring dilithium from the nebula to planets that have been cut off by the Burn.

== Cast and characters ==
=== Main ===
- Sonequa Martin-Green as Michael Burnham
- Doug Jones as Saru
- Anthony Rapp as Paul Stamets
- Mary Wiseman as Sylvia Tilly
- David Ajala as Cleveland "Book" Booker
- Wilson Cruz as Hugh Culber
- Rachael Ancheril as Nhan

=== Recurring ===
- Michelle Yeoh as Philippa Georgiou
- Tig Notaro as Jett Reno
- Blu del Barrio as Adira Tal
- Ian Alexander as Gray Tal
- Oded Fehr as Charles Vance
- Noah Averbach-Katz as Ryn
- Janet Kidder as Osyraa

=== Notable guests ===
- Annabelle Wallis as the voice of Zora
- David Cronenberg as Kovich
- Sonja Sohn as Gabrielle Burnham
- Hannah Cheesman as Airiam
- Paul Guilfoyle as the Guardian of Forever
- Rekha Sharma as Ellen Landry
- Kenneth Mitchell as Aurellio

== Production ==
=== Development ===
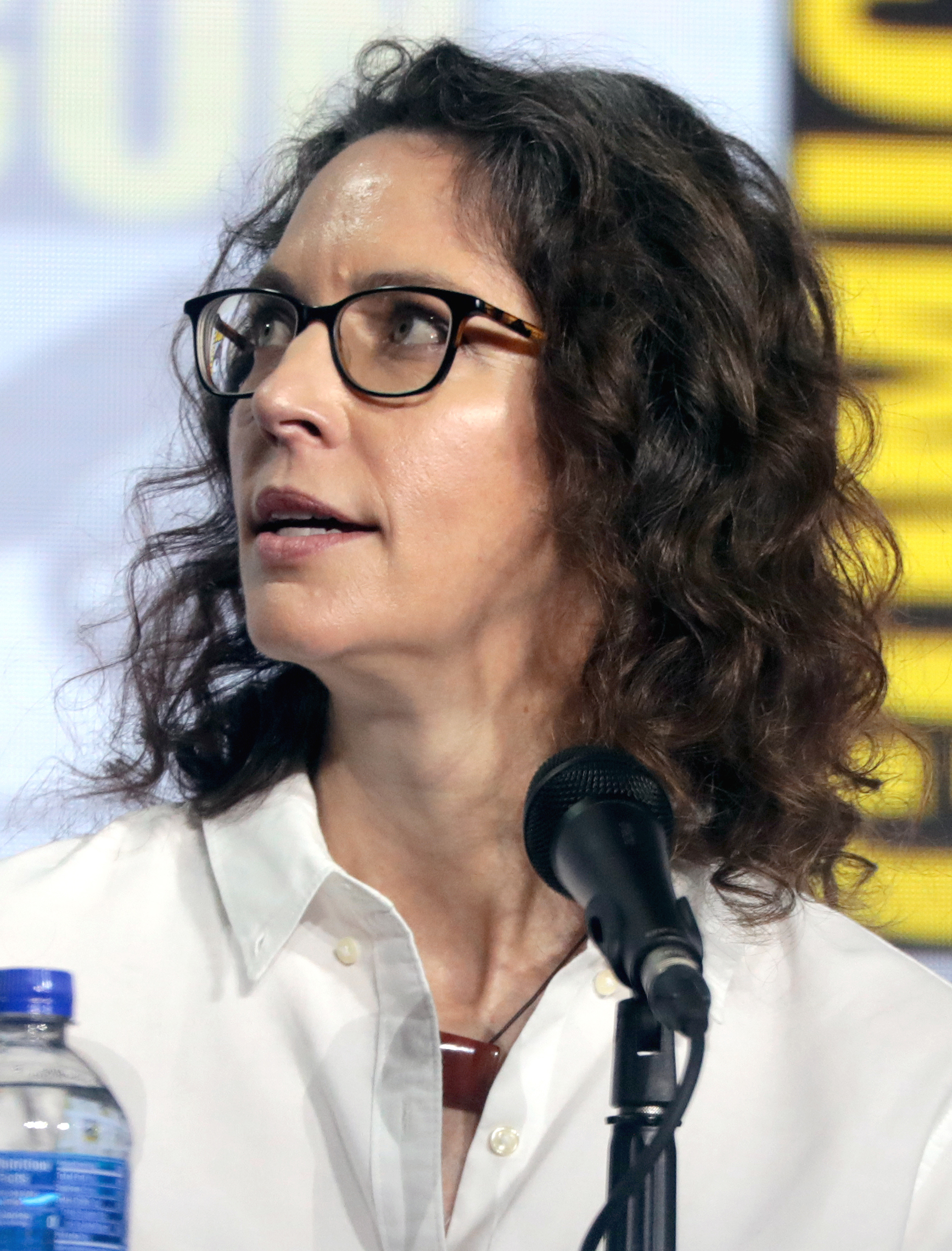
Writer Michelle Paradise was made co-showrunner for the third season.

On February 27, 2019, CBS All Access renewed Star Trek: Discovery for a third season, shortly after the second season premiered, citing the positive fan response to the premiere as well as the service's increased subscription count in that time. After joining the series in the second season, writer Michelle Paradise was promoted to co-showrunner for the third alongside series co-creator Alex Kurtzman. Kurtzman explained that Paradise had been essential to his process during the second season, becoming a partner for him while he oversaw multiple Star Trek series in addition to showrunning Discovery. By the end of the second season he felt that Paradise was already running Discovery with him, so it was an easy transition to her becoming official co-showrunner during the third season. In October, Kurtzman said the season would have 13 episodes, and this was unlikely to be extended as happened for the previous two seasons. The season was produced by CBS Television Studios in association with Kurtzman's production company, Secret Hideout, as well as Roddenberry Entertainment.

=== Writing ===
The writers room for the season included Jenny Lumet, Anne Cofell Saunders, Ken Lin, Alan McElroy, Kirsten Beyer, Brandon Schultz, Erika Lippoldt, Bo Yeon Kim, Chris Silvestri, Anthony Maranville, Sean Cochran, and Kalinda Vazquez. They began work at the end of February 2019, at Kurtzman's Secret Hideout offices in Santa Monica. Astrophysicist Erin Macdonald and biologist Mohamed Noor consulted on the season, after joining the Star Trek franchise as general science advisors, as did frequent Star Trek linguist Marc Okrand who helped develop the season's alien languages, such as Kelpien. After working in the writers room for the series Snowfall, author Walter Mosley was hired by Kurtzman for a similar role on the third season of Discovery. Mosley worked for three weeks before he was notified by CBS of a complaint that had been made against him by another writer for Mosley's use of the word "nigger" while telling a story. CBS told Mosley this was a fireable offence, but said no further action would be taken if he did not use the word again outside of a script. Mosley chose to leave the series, quitting without informing Kurtzman and Paradise. He explained his decision in an op-ed for The New York Times in September 2019. Mosley did not identify the series in the op-ed, but CBS confirmed that it was Discovery in their response.

The second season ended with the USS Discovery traveling over 900 years into the future, freeing the series from the continuity of previous Star Trek stories and allowing it to explore a new time period. Kurtzman compared this decision to that of the film Star Trek (2009)—on which he worked as a writer—starting a new timeline to avoid established continuity. Star Sonequa Martin-Green described the new setting as a "blank slate". In October 2020, Kurtzman revealed that the season takes place following a cataclysmic event, the Burn, that separated people and changed the way that they communicate. He noted that this is "exactly what we are going through right now" with the COVID-19 pandemic, though the season was produced before the pandemic began. Paradise said the season's main theme was the importance of connections, including family and cultural connections.

The writers knew that the protagonist, Martin-Green's Michael Burnham, would become captain of Discovery eventually and decided that they wanted that to happen at the end of the third season. They wanted to give her the best arc possible by first taking the character far away from that goal. The first episode focuses on Burnham, alone in the future until she meets new character Cleveland "Book" Booker, with the rest of the Discovery crew being the focus of the second episode. They are reunited with Burnham in the third, which is set one year after the events of the first episode for Burnham. Burnham declines to become captain then, deferring to Saru who was the acting captain at the end of the second season. Burnham spends the first half of the season questioning her place on Discovery and trying to reconcile her role on the ship with the year she spent with Book. She recommits to Starfleet in "Unification III", and the rest of the season builds to her becoming captain. Saru's storyline focuses on his connection to other Kelpiens and his home planet of Kaminar, and he ends the season with Su'Kal on Kaminar. Paradise said this was not necessarily a way to bring Saru's story "full circle", and was more a way to show his natural progression from his brief interactions with other Kelpiens in the previous seasons.

Kurtzman explained that a planned spin-off to star Michelle Yeoh as Philippa Georgiou was not expected to be made until after the third season of Discovery was completed. Executive producer Heather Kadin said Yeoh's third-season role could lead to a direct tie-in with the spin-off. Discovery writers Bo Yeon Kim and Erika Lippoldt were set to work on the spin-off, and developed Georgiou's character arc in the third season. It ends with her being written out of Discovery in the two-part episode "Terra Firma". They wanted a "timey-wimey solution" for sending Georgiou to her new destination, and chose the Guardian of Forever from the Star Trek: The Original Series episode "The City on the Edge of Forever". Discovery introduces a new personification of the Guardian called "Carl", named for and inspired by astronomer and author Carl Sagan. "Terra Firma" was given as an example of the season's more episodic approach, with each episode having a central character, villain, or standalone story that is connected to the season-long mystery of what caused the Burn. Other examples include "People of Earth", in which Earth is treated like a planet of the week, and the focus on Vulcan culture in "Unification III". Paradise said this approach allowed some characters to be explored that usually would not be. The Burn being an accident caused by a child was inspired by the Ursula K. Le Guin short story "The Ones Who Walk Away from Omelas" (1973), while the holographic simulation that Su'Kal lives in was inspired by The Matrix (1999).

When asked if the series would directly tie-in with Star Trek: Picard, Kurtzman said it would not, but there would be references to previous Star Trek series. These include a mention of the Temporal Wars from Star Trek: Enterprise, which take place during the 31st century. That was the furthest the franchise had gone into the future until this season, which is set in the 32nd century. The season reveals that a temporal agent crossed over from the alternate timeline created during the events of the film Star Trek (2009), which is the first reference to the film franchise's alternate reality made by a Star Trek series. The episode "Unification III" serves as an informal sequel to the two-part Star Trek: The Next Generation episode "Unification", which saw Burnham's brother Spock begin to unify the Vulcan and Romulan people; in "Unification III", the planet Vulcan has been renamed Ni'Var and is home to both Vulcans and Romulans, including the Qowat Milat, a sect of Romulan warrior nuns that were introduced in Picard. Kadin stated before the season's premiere that the Star Trek: Short Treks short "Calypso" was set around the same time as the season, and there was a chance that Aldis Hodge could reprise his role from the short, but Paradise later said "Calypso" is actually set many years after the season. Instead, the season foreshadows "Calypso" by showing the Sphere data from the second season beginning to integrate with Discovery, becoming the advanced artificial intelligence Zora that was introduced in the short.

=== Casting ===
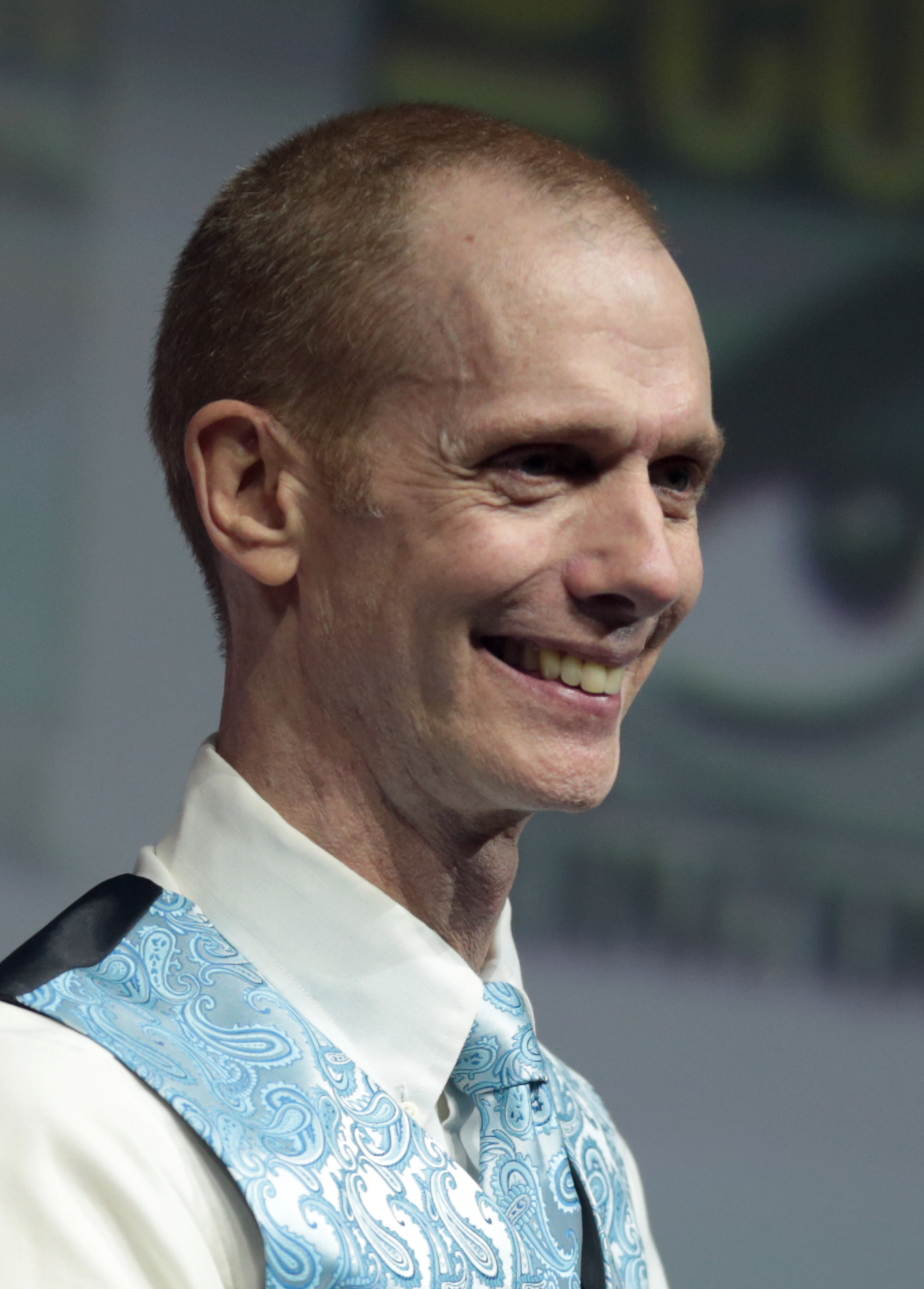
Doug Jones portrays Saru, who serves as captain in the season, and appears in the role without prosthetics in several episodes for the first time in the series.

The season stars the returning Sonequa Martin-Green as Michael Burnham, Doug Jones as Saru, Anthony Rapp as Paul Stamets, Mary Wiseman as Sylvia Tilly, and Wilson Cruz as Hugh Culber. They are joined by David Ajala, who was announced as new series regular Cleveland "Book" Booker in July 2019. Book helps introduce the season's new setting, and is also a love interest for Burnham that the writers hoped would bring out new sides to her character in contrast to her tumultuous relationship with Ash Tyler in the previous seasons. Rachael Ancheril is also credited as starring for her appearances in the season, reprising her recurring guest role as Nhan from the second season. She is written out of the season in the fifth episode. Inside the holographic simulation that the characters enter in "Su'Kal", their appearance is changed to look like different in-universe alien species. Burnham appears as a Trill, Culber as a Bajoran, and Saru as a human. Jones usually wears prosthetics to portray the Kelpien character so this was the first time that he appeared as himself in the series. Despite this, he spent a similar time in the makeup and hair department due to the wig that he wears; Jones felt hair would make human Saru more "off-putting", but his own head is shaved for the series to help with the prosthetics.

Kurtzman confirmed in January 2019 that Michelle Yeoh would appear in the third season as Philippa Georgiou. Annabelle Wallis reprises her role from "Calypso" as the voice of Zora, the advanced version of Discovery, while Sonja Sohn reprises her role as Burnham's mother, Gabrielle, from the second season in "Unification III". That episode also features archive footage of Burnham's brother Spock, including footage of Ethan Peck from Discovery's second season and of Leonard Nimoy from The Next Generation's "Unification" episodes. In "Terra Firma", several actors portray Mirror Universe versions of their characters, including Hannah Cheesman and Rekha Sharma as their respective characters from earlier seasons, Airiam and Ellen Landry. "Terra Firma" also guest stars Paul Guilfoyle as "Carl", the Guardian of Forever. An archived recording of Bart LaRue, the original voice of the Guardian from "The City on the Edge of Forever", is also used. Kenneth Mitchell, who guest starred as several Klingon characters during the first two seasons, appears as a new human character, scientist Aurellio. The character uses a hover chair due to a genetic condition, a storyline that was written to accommodate Mitchell's ALS diagnosis in August 2018, for which he began using a wheel chair in October 2019.

Kurtzman said the third season would expand on the crew of the Discovery outside the main cast after fans responded positively to those characters in the second season. Tig Notaro reprises her role as engineer Jett Reno, with other returning crewmembers including Emily Coutts as Keyla Detmer, Patrick Kwok-Choon as Gen Rhys, Oyin Oladejo as Joann Owosekun, Ronnie Rowe Jr. as R.A. Bryce, Sara Mitich as Nilsson, Raven Dauda as Tracy Pollard, and David Benjamin Tomlinson as Linus the Saurian. Julianne Grossman also returns as the voice of Discovery's computer. New cast members for the season include Adil Hussain as Aditya Sahil; Jake Weber as the courier Zareh; Oded Fehr as Admiral Charles Vance; David Cronenberg as Dr. Kovich; Mary Wiseman's then-husband Noah Averbach-Katz as Ryn; Janet Kidder as Osyraa; and Bill Irwin as Su'Kal. Kurtzman originally asked Jones to portray Su'Kal in addition to Saru, but the actor chose not to due to the work required to portray two characters. When Kurtzman suggested Irwin, Jones agreed that the actor could "pull it off". Hannah Spear and Robert Verlaque, who previously portrayed Saru's sister and father, respectively, appear as Su'Kal's mother Dr. Issa and as a Kelpien elder. Fabio Tassone voices Book's ship computer, and Book's pet cat Grudge is portrayed by two Maine Coons, Leeu and Durban. Paradise said they wanted a "really big, fluffy, substantial beast of a cat" to portray Grudge, with Leeu and Durban being 40 inches (1.0 m) long and weighing 18 pounds (8.2 kg). Having two cats on set allowed the crew to choose which to use depending on their behavior.

Casting had begun by June 2019 for the new role of Adira, a non-binary character described as "incredibly intelligent and self-confident" with the potential to become a recurring guest. Despite the character being portrayed as 16 years old in the season, an actor 18 years or older was being looked for. In September 2020, non-binary newcomer Blu del Barrio was revealed to be portraying Adira, while transgender actor Ian Alexander was announced as cast in the role of Gray, a Trill character. Both characters were said to be the first explicitly non-binary and transgender characters within the Star Trek franchise, respectively. The writers knew early on in development that they wanted to include non-binary and transgender representation to explore new perspectives and stories for Star Trek. They used Trill mythology for this storyline due to that species being considered an allegory for LGBTQ people by many fans of Star Trek: The Next Generation and Star Trek: Deep Space Nine. The writers worked with del Barrio, Alexander, and LGBTQ media monitoring organization GLAAD when developing the characters due to there being no non-binary or transgender writers working on the series. Del Barrio wanted Adira's story to reflect their own experience, especially since del Barrio had not come out to their family when they began working on the series. Adira was introduced using the pronouns she/her, until del Barrio came out ahead of their casting announcement. At that point, the character's coming out was written into the series and they/them pronouns were used.

=== Design ===
The series' opening title sequence was updated by creative agency Prologue to feature new imagery from the season, such as red dilithium crystals, Book's ship, the new 32nd-century Starfleet badges, and the wormhole that brought Discovery to the future. The season also features a "streamlined" new logo to reflect its new setting. Kurtzman felt this was especially important since the series' initial logo reflects the Klingon storyline of the first season, which the series had moved on from. The opening title sequence for "Terra Firma, Part 2" is inverted from the standard sequence and shown in negative to reflect the episode's Mirror Universe setting.

Production designer Tamara Deverell left the series after the first two seasons to work on the film Nightmare Alley (2021). She was replaced by Phillip Barker, who was suggested to Kurtzman because of his experimental art films despite having no experience with science fiction. Barker was friends with Deverell and studied her work on the first two seasons, but was able to approach the third as a fresh start due to the new time period. He began by discussing predictions of the future, including potential technology, with scientists and artists, and was drawn to the idea of using nanobots that could react to users' thoughts to transform into different items. Kurtzman described this as "programmable matter", and it became one of the key new technologies for the season. Barker compared it to "open[ing] up a Pandora's box… where everything was not real, everything was a simulation of something else". Kurtzman said there was a temptation to say "anything is possible and the laws of physics don't apply anymore" when designing future technology, but it was important to have the story drive the technology and remain grounded. This meant creating evolved versions of existing Star Trek technology to ground the season in the franchise's previous designs, such as introducing the USS Voyager-J, an advanced version of the starship USS Voyager from Star Trek: Voyager. Other new Starfleet ships designed for the season include: the Eisenberg-class USS Nog, named in memory of Aron Eisenberg who portrayed Nog on Star Trek: Deep Space Nine; the Mars-class USS Le Guin, named for author Ursula K. Le Guin; the Angelou-class USS Maathai, with the class named after poet and activist Maya Angelou while the ship is named for the Nobel Peace Prize-winning activist Wangari Maathai; the Courage-class USS Jubayr which is named after 13th-century geographer Ibn Jubayr; and the Saturn-class USS Annan, named for the former Secretary-General of the United Nations, Kofi Annan.

Costume designer Gersha Phillips was unsure where to begin with the season after the time jump into the far future until she decided to return to an idea she had on the first season. Phillips had attempted to create costumes with no seams using "no sew" bonding techniques such as glue and tape, but the first season's producers had rejected this because they wanted to see more details in the costumes. Phillips was able to use this approach for the third season, creating "clean" uniforms for the future Starfleet. The uniforms are mostly gray, with Starfleet divisions represented by a colored stripe, and rank identified by divots on the communication badges. Phillips was asked to take inspiration from the Star Wars character Han Solo when designing Book's costumes, and she created a "space cowboy" look that was more organic than the "techie" Starfleet designs and showed the character's "freedom and self-expression". Burnham meeting Book is one of the first times that she wears non-Starfleet clothing in the series, and Phillips was interested to show more of the character's personality in her clothing. These choices also took inspiration from Book's clothing, including for a coat Book gives her early on in the season that was sourced from Bulgarian fashion brand Demobaza. Burnham's hair is much longer in the season to depict the passage of time for her. After seeing Martin-Green with braided hair at a red carpet event, Kurtzman insisted that Burnham's longer hair be styled the same way. Martin-Green suggested alternate styles, including more natural curly hair, but she and hair department head Ryan Reed agreed with Kurtzman after reading the season's scripts. The Mirror Universe version of Burnham in "Terra Firma" has a shorter "military cut" hairstyle, and Egyptian-style makeup that makeup department head Shauna Llewellyn wanted to be the opposite look to the Prime Universe's Burnham. Llewellyn attempted to go "extreme with alter egos" for all of the Mirror Universe characters.

Glenn Hetrick of Alchemy Studio, who provides special makeup and prosthetics for the series, tweaked the Kelpien prosthetics for Jones in the season, and the on-set team was able to apply them in an hour-and-a-half to two hours time, down from over three hours previously. One of Hetrick's primary focuses for the season was creating the alien Orion characters, which were made using green, silicon face masks rather than just having "people painted green" like in previous Star Trek series. Both Hetrick and creature designer Neville Page noted that one of the differences between the franchise's earlier series and Discovery is that the latter is filmed in high-definition, and modern audiences expect higher-quality effects. The Andorian alien characters have antennae on their heads that could be removed from the prosthetics if more emotion-driven movement was required, to make it easier for digital versions to be added by the visual effects team. The rest of the Andorian prosthetics included more shaping around the head to integrate with the antennae and to try make the characters look more interesting. Hetrick felt this was close enough to the more straightforward makeup of the previous Star Trek series that fans would still recognise the characters as Andorians, or at least as a group of Andorians that had not been seen before.

=== Filming ===
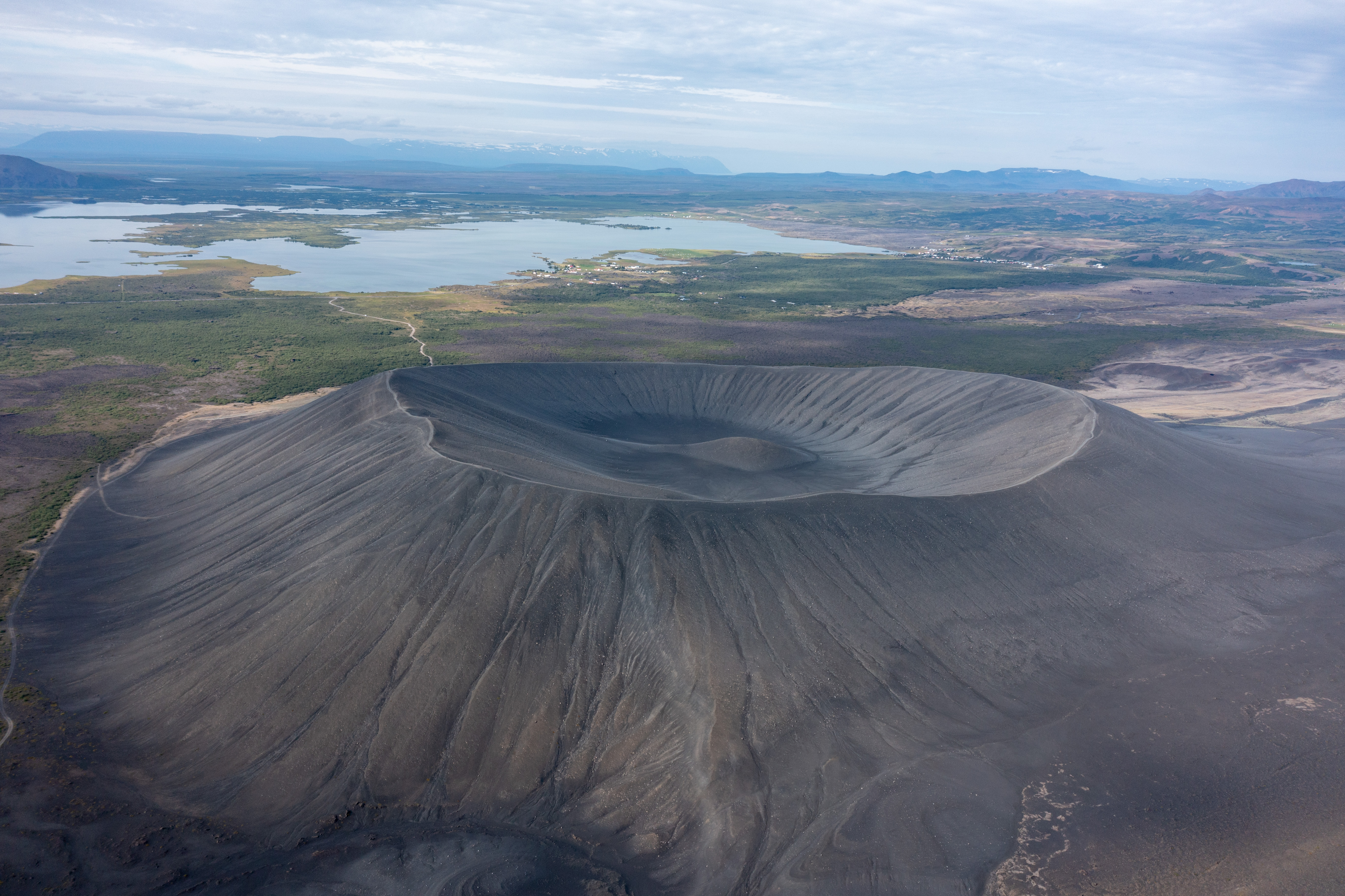
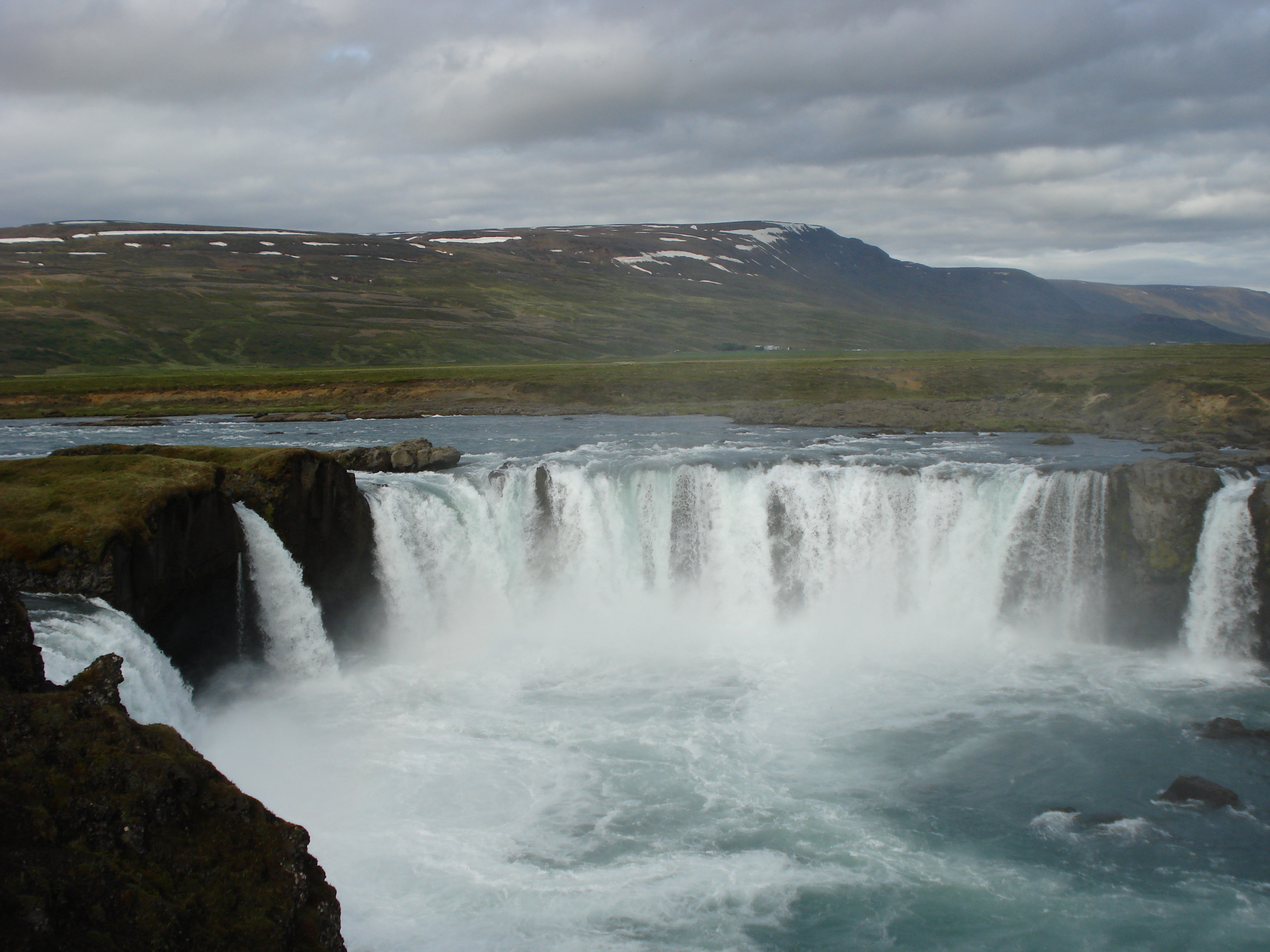
Filming for the first two episodes took place in Iceland, including at the Hverfell volcano (top) and the Goðafoss waterfall (bottom).

The season began filming in July 2019 with six days on location in Iceland. The country was chosen because the producers wanted to introduce the future of Star Trek with a place that looked different to the previous seasons, and because Kurtzman had always wanted to film there. Originally, the first two episodes of the season were to be directed by producing director Olatunde Osunsanmi and frequent Star Trek director Jonathan Frakes, respectively, but both episodes required location filming in Iceland. Osunsanmi ultimately directed both, beginning with a combined Iceland shoot, with Frakes then directing the third episode. Glen Keenan returned from the second season as the lead director of photography for the third, including serving as the cinematographer for the first two episodes. Filming locations in Iceland included the Hverfell volcano, Goðafoss waterfall, Lake Kleifarvatn, and the Blue Lagoon. The series took advantage of the Icelandic Film Commission's payback program, which reimburses 25 percent of the production costs spent in the country, receiving around US$421,480.

Filming for the rest of the season began at Pinewood Toronto Studios in Toronto, Canada, on July 18, under the working title Green Harvest. Each episode took 10 to 12 days to film on average. Frakes described the series' directing style as "shoot to thrill", with the episodic directors being encouraged to create "fabulous, intricate, complicated" shots in addition to the basic "coverage" that television directors are required to film. However, he said this was toned down for the third season compared to the previous two. In addition to Keenan, Crescenzo Notarile also served as a cinematographer for the season after working with Osunsanmi on the series Gotham. Notarile initially did not want to "rock the boat" by changing the established style of the series, which used Arri Alexa SXT cameras and Cooke Optics' Anamorphic/i Special Flare lenses. The season would often use up to four cameras at once, which made it difficult for the cinematographers to light the scenes, but Notarile felt the result made up for this by being "very visceral". The cameras were primarily on steadicam mounts, a technocrane, or a dolly cart, and often used Dutch angles, which created a style of moving and floating that the cinematographers believed would feel "Trekian". Barker's sets were specifically designed to work with the anamorphic lenses' widescreen format. Notarile soon felt confident that he could push the style of the series further with different in-camera effects, such as adding filters and prisms, using "image shakers" to safely add shaking effects to the camera, and shining a flashlight through different colored glass to distort the image. Some of the filters he used were created specifically for the season by optics company Schneider Kreuznach to give Notarile more control over lens flares. The Discovery bridge set was lit with 5000 LEDs that the cinematographers could control, including changing their color for when the ship goes into alert mode. Different lighting techniques were required for the actors wearing prosthetics and makeup: soft light from a low angle was needed for Jones's Saru prosthetics to be able to see his eyes, while Kidder was overexposed to let her green makeup "glow and blow out the imperfections".

Jon Dudkowski, one of the series' editors, made his directorial debut with the episode "Unification III". Filming for a mining colony took place at the Stelco steel plant in Hamilton, Ontario, while the planet that the Guardian of Forever appears on was filmed in an Ontario quarry. In December 2019, filming took place at the disused Kingston Penitentiary in Kingston, Ontario, to portray part of the holographic environment that Su'Kal lives in. Jones pre-recorded Saru's Kelpien singing for those scenes and lip-synced the lines on set. Filming officially wrapped in Toronto on February 24, 2020, 10 days before lockdowns began due to the COVID-19 pandemic.

=== Post-production ===
Kadin stated in January 2020 that the season should be ready by that May. In late March, post-production work for the season, including editing, visual effects, and scoring, was taking place remotely due to the COVID-19 pandemic. Jon Dudkowski shared editing duties for the season with Scott Gamzon and Andrew Coutts. Their workflow involved the compiling of footage after each day of filming, working on each episode with its director for four days, and then finalizing the episodes with the showrunners. During post-production, Kurtzman brought film composer and editor John Ottman to the series to oversee the editors and help shape the episodes; Ottman had previously approached Kurtzman about the opportunity to work on Star Trek as a big fan of the franchise. In July, Paradise said the crew was "working nonstop" to complete post-production, but it was taking longer than previous seasons due to the pandemic. The editors, mixers, and color graders carried out work from their houses, with Kurtzman and Paradise supervising via Zoom. Okrand coached the actors via Skype on speaking alien languages for additional dialogue recording. The season was scheduled to premiere in October 2020, after the season finale of Star Trek: Lower Decks, and Kurtzman explained that the debut was delayed until after Lower Decks had been released because of how much longer post-production on Discovery took during the pandemic. Late in post-production, the producers added a quote to the end of the season finale from Star Trek creator Gene Roddenberry about connections. Paradise said it "felt appropriate to have something from him" due to the season's themes of connection as well as the effects of the pandemic when the season was being released.

=== Visual effects ===
Star Trek: Discovery was the first visual effects-heavy series to go through post-production during the pandemic. Kurtzman and Paradise reviewed visual effects shots remotely several times a week with visual effects supervisor Jason Zimmerman. Visual effects shots for each episode on Discovery typically take eight-to-ten months to complete, and this took longer for the third season during the pandemic. The season had an estimated 3500 to 5000 visual effects shots. Visual effects vendors included Pixomondo, Ghost VFX, Mackevision, Crafty Apes, DNEG, The Mill, and FX3X, as well as Zimmerman's in-house team at CBS Studios.

Since the production was unable to carry out additional photography to film pickup shots with the actors during lockdown, visual effects were used to fill these requirements. Fully computer-generated shots were created with digital doubles of the actors based on existing scans. The actors filmed motion capture performances in their houses that were then used to drive the performances of the doubles. The season required more environmental work and set extensions than the previous two, including the creation of complex holograms to augment sets. When characters are seen talking via hologram, both actors were usually filmed on set together and then a clean plate of the set without the actors was used to add transparency. Fully digital environments included the futuristic San Francisco when Discovery visits Earth and the forested homeworld of the Trills. On the latter planet, Adira enters a dream-like environment that was created digitally by Mackevision. The company animated 3D tendrils into the scene, and used a digital double of del Bario for the transition into the environment.

When adding visual effects to the environments of the first two episodes, Zimmerman made sure to retain the "true wonder" of the Iceland location shots. The parasitic ice from the second episode was created with a particle simulation by Pixomondo, who created 570 shots for the season. The company had to match their digital ice to the real glacier in Iceland. The effect of the ice forming tentacles around Discovery was difficult due to it being done near the end of Pixomondo's production schedule when time constraints limited what could be done. It ultimately required hand animation to complete rather than simulations.

Describing the season's new setting as a "double-edged sword", Zimmerman explained that they no longer had to work within the confines of established continuity but all of the new effects would still be scrutinized by fans. Discussion began early regarding how the classic Star Trek transporter effect should be depicted in this time period, and Crafty Apes created 10 to 15 different versions of what the new effect could look like. The chosen style is much faster than in previous series to show an advancement in technology. The effect of the character in "Die Trying" who was in a transporter accident was created by Ghost VFX. Other new effects include programmable matter and the fact that many chairs and consoles float. Pixomondo worked on the look of programmable matter, and initially were able to simulate it based on the movements of Book's hands on the console of his ship.

Zimmerman praised the series' art department for the different starship designs that they produced for the season, noting that they were very different from what was seen previously. Pixomondo created the sequence where Discovery arrives at Starfleet headquarters, where 15 new Starfleet ships are introduced. The headquarters environment is a "bubble forcefield generated by a corkscrew-looking space station" at its center, and Pixomondo had to track where all of the starships were inside the environment so the correct ones would always be visible for each shot. Many of the larger ships are seen moving slowly to help convey their size. Pixomondo also developed some of the non-Starfleet starships, such as Book's smaller courier ship. The biggest challenge with that ship was the fact that it can break apart and reform, with the visual effects team attempting to create logical ways for this to happen. In the season premiere, Book's ship is pursued through a debris field by another courier ship that Pixomondo also created. Some of the debris used digital models recycled from the previous seasons, but other elements had to be created new for the episode. The model of the Discovery was also reused from previous seasons, but it was upgraded to use programmable matter after a few episodes. Pixomondo developed a new process for the season's viewscreen effects, which were created in the previous seasons with 2D animation. For the upgraded Discovery model and future ships such as Book's, full 3D elements were animated and added to the shots.

The season had more digital creature work than previous seasons, including the trance worm from the premiere episode, nicknamed "Molly", which was designed by Neville Page. Ghost VFX created the worm, which was added to footage from the Iceland shoot. Ghost was also the lead vendor on "Su'Kal", contributing 130 effects shots to the episode and almost 500 for the season. "Su'Kal" required a digital environment for the holographic simulation that the title character lives in, as well as digital creature-work for the wraith-like monster that stalks him. There had been a physical version of the creature on set that was always going to be augmented with visual effects, but the team experimented with different approaches that ranged from small adjustments to completely replacing the actor with a digital version. The producers chose a solution where they would attempt to retain the on set performance but replace the actor with the "coolest and most complex" digital design. This gave them the freedom to develop the creature and the different shots as needed. The design of the creature needed to be scary, but it was also required to emote for certain story moments. The underlying muscle and skeleton system was driven by motion capture, with particle and cloth simulations layered on top that were intended to look like the creature was underwater. For a scene where the creature's mood changes from angry to calm, the "turbulence" setting of the simulation was increased to make the cloth and particles "flutter", before toning it down when the creature is calm to make the cloth appear weightless as if it is in calm water. Performance capture was used for the creature's facial expressions, which were then perfected by the visual effects artists, and Zimmerman said it was rare for the series to feature that level of nuanced, visual effects-driven creature work. Crafty Apes and DNEG also contributed to "Su'Kal", with the latter creating the Verubin Nebula digital environment.

=== Music ===
By the end of January 2020, composer Jeff Russo had written some pre-recorded music for the season for use in the scene where Gray plays the cello for Adira. This music is heard throughout the season. Russo had not yet seen any of the completed episodes when he composed the cello music. He was "full speed ahead" composing music for the first five episodes in April 2020, working remotely due to the COVID-19 pandemic. His intention was to record the scores with an orchestra later, once it was safe to do so. A month later, Russo had begun remotely recording individual musicians from their homes. Recording engineer Michael Perfitt combined the different recordings to make them sound like the musicians were recorded together at a scoring stage, and Russo felt the result would not be of a lower quality compared to his scores for the previous seasons.

Russo said his approach to the season's music was not affected by the time-jump between seasons, stating that it still sounded like Discovery despite the new motifs he wrote for new characters (including the cat Grudge) and locations. He did state that the season would make less references to Alexander Courage's original Star Trek music and would instead make more references to Russo's own music for the first two seasons of Discovery. For example, Russo brought back his Mirror Universe music from the first season for Georgiou's storyline. Courage's theme does get played over the season finale's end credits, which Paradise said was a way of "honoring what gave birth to all of this", while Russo also referenced Jerry Goldsmith's main theme from Star Trek: Voyager when the USS Voyager-J appears. The "Andorian Opera" that is played by Aurellio near the end of the season was sung by Ayana Haviv. A soundtrack album for the season was released digitally by Lakeshore Records on April 16, 2021. All music composed by Jeff Russo:

Original Series Soundtrack: Season 3
No.	Title	Length
1.	"Burnham Crash Lands"	1:58
2.	"Book's Ship / Hello Grudge"	3:16
3.	"Federation Is Gone"	3:26
4.	"Sanctuary"	1:46
5.	"Meeting Zareh"	3:38
6.	"Georgiou and Zareh"	3:12
7.	"It's You, Saru"	1:48
8.	"Grow Through Change"	3:38
9.	"Starfleet Academy"	1:49
10.	"Hugh's Log"	2:15
11.	"Entering the Pool"	2:06
12.	"Adira Accepted"	2:26
13.	"Gray and Adira's Melody (Discovery Lullaby)"	1:06
14.	"Federation HQ"	3:52
15.	"Barzan Family"	1:37
16.	"Cryo Tombs / Attis Attacks"	2:25
17.	"Leaving Nhan"	2:15
18.	"Reunited With Book"	2:53
19.	"The Escape"	5:15
20.	"Osyraa Wants Ryn"	3:25
21.	"Kyheem and Osyraa"	2:21
22.	"Work Together"	2:45
23.	"Duet for Cello and Piano"	1:32
24.	"Terran Stories"	1:39
25.	"The Charon"	1:22
26.	"Fireflies"	3:06
27.	"Killing Traitors"	1:57
28.	"The Guardian"	1:54
29.	"Georgiou Goodbye"	6:22
30.	"Meeting Survivor"	2:43
31.	"Andorian Opera"	3:31
32.	"Michael's Win"	2:29
33.	"Michael to the Rescue"	1:40
34.	"Sending Stamets to HQ"	1:45
35.	"Dots Will Help"	1:36
36.	"Deliver the Bomb"	5:48
37.	"Resetting the Datacore"	2:40
38.	"Book Jumps"	1:14
39.	"Reuniting the Federation"	2:16
40.	"Captain Burnham"	4:28
Total length:		1:47:00

== Marketing ==
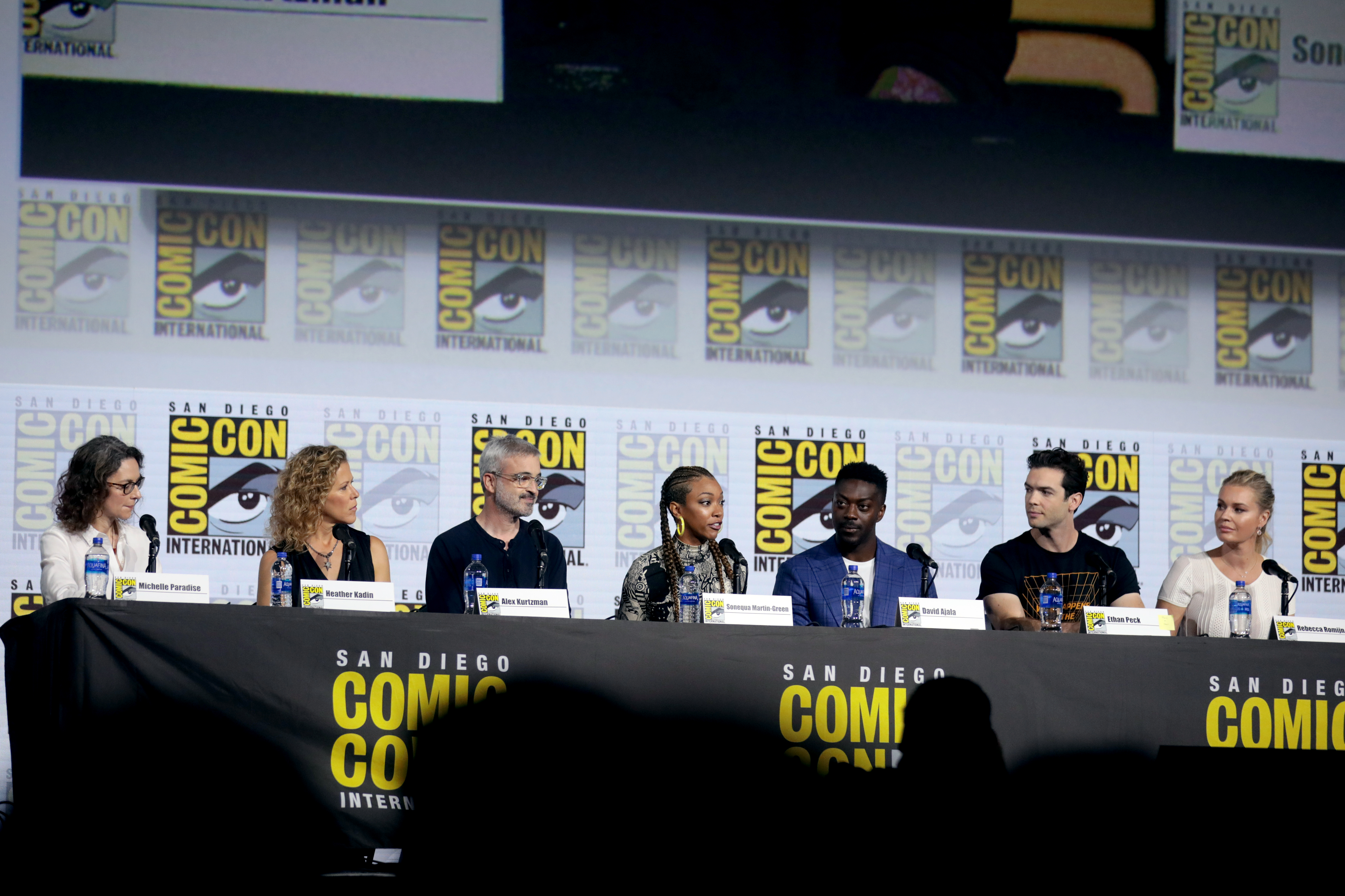
Star Trek: Discovery panel at the 2019 San Diego Comic-Con

The series was promoted at San Diego Comic-Con 2019 in a "Star Trek Universe" panel alongside other series from the franchise. The panel featured Kurtzman, Paradise, and Martin-Green, and introduced Ajala. Comic-Con also had an "immersive transporter experience" that allowed fans to "step aboard the USS Discovery and travel to strange and distant lands". The cast and crew promoted the season at further Star Trek Universe panels at New York Comic Con and PaleyFest New York in October, with a trailer revealed at the New York Comic Con panel. Several commentators questioned whether Starfleet still existed in the universe based on dialogue in the trailer. The cast and crew promoted Discovery in a virtual Star Trek Universe panel for the 2020 Comic-Con@Home convention, with a table read of the second-season finale's first act and discussion of the third season. The live stream of the event was interrupted for around 20 minutes when CBS's content protection system blocked it for copyright infringement.

The season's premiere date was announced shortly after Comic-Con@Home and was accompanied by a brief teaser depicting Burnham planting the Federation flag on a new planet. This was followed by a trailer celebrating "23 weeks of New Trek" and featuring footage from both the third season of Discovery and the first season of Lower Decks; the 23 weeks include both series, with Lower Decks premiering on August 6 and running for 10 weeks, followed the next week by the premiere of Discovery which then ran for 13 weeks. On September 8, CBS All Access streamed a free 24-hour event to celebrate the 54th anniversary of the Original Series premiere. The event included a marathon of episodes from across the Star Trek franchise, with a break during the day for a series of panels about different series. These included a panel for Discovery featuring Martin-Green, Ajala, Kurtzman, and Paradise, who debuted a full trailer for the season revealing that it was about bringing hope back to the Federation in an uncertain future. The series' new logo and the season's key art poster were also released. Another virtual Star Trek Universe panel was held for the 2020 New York Comic Con a week before the season's premiere. The cast and crew discussed the season and revealed the opening scene of the premiere. In November, ViacomCBS announced that it would donate all proceeds from a new line of Discovery-themed merchandise to GLAAD, to support the organization's "culture changing work to accelerate acceptance for LGBTQ people".

== Release ==
=== Streaming and broadcast ===
The season premiered on CBS All Access in the United States on October 15, 2020, and was released weekly for 13 episodes until January 7, 2021. Bell Media broadcast the season in Canada on CTV Sci-Fi Channel (English) and Z (French) on the same day as the U.S., before streaming episodes on Crave. Netflix released each episode for streaming in another 188 countries within 24 hours of its U.S. debut. In September 2020, ViacomCBS announced that CBS All Access would be expanded and rebranded as Paramount+ in March 2021. Existing episodes of the season remained on Paramount+ along with future seasons of the series. In November 2021, ViacomCBS announced that it had bought back the international streaming rights to Discovery from Netflix effective immediately. In August 2023, Star Trek content was removed from Crave and the season began streaming on Paramount+ in Canada. It would continue to be broadcast on CTV Sci-Fi and be available on CTV.ca and the CTV app.

=== Home media ===
The season was released on DVD, Blu-Ray, and Limited Edition Steelbook formats in the U.S. on July 20, 2021. The release includes over two hours of bonus features, including deleted scenes, a gag reel, and featurettes on the making of the season, filming in Iceland, the stunts, the bridge crew, the development of Michael Burnham's character, and Kenneth Mitchell's ALS diagnosis and role in the season. On November 2, 2021, a home media box set collecting the first three seasons of Discovery was released, with more than eight hours of special features including behind-the-scenes featurettes, deleted and extended scenes, audio commentaries, and gag reels.

== Reception ==
=== Viewership ===
Audience demand analytics company Parrot Analytics estimates streaming viewership based on global "demand expressions", with the "desire, engagement, and viewership weighted by importance". A month after the season premiered, the company said the demand for the series had "surged" to being 36.1 times more in-demand than the average United States series. Travis Clark of Business Insider said Star Trek: Discovery was certainly the most popular original series on CBS All Access, and Parrot's data placed it in third place on their weekly list of most in-demand streaming series for the week beginning November 9. The series remained in Parrot's top nine most in-demand streaming series list for each week until the one beginning December 21, and it returned to the list two weeks later (the week beginning January 4, 2021) when the season finale was released, at which point Parrot calculated the series to be 33.4 times more in-demand than the average U.S. series. In the company's list of the top 20 most in-demand streaming series of 2020, Discovery was ranked 12th and listed as 25.7 times more in-demand than the average U.S. series. It was the highest ranked CBS All Access series for the year, with the only other All Access series on the list being the first season of Star Trek: Picard (ranked 14th).

=== Critical response ===
The review aggregator website Rotten Tomatoes reported a 91% approval rating for the third season, with an average rating of 7.7/10 based on 35 reviews. The website's critical consensus reads, "With less canonical baggage and a welcome dose of character development, Discovery continues to forge its own path and is narratively all the better for it." Metacritic, which uses a weighted average, assigned a score of 75 out of 100 based on reviews from 8 critics, indicating "generally favorable" reviews.

Monita Mohan, looking back on the season for Collider, said a time jump within a series can be controversial, but worked in Discovery's favor; the change in setting received praise from many critics. Scott Collura at IGN described it as a reboot and felt it was likely where the first season of the series should have begun, creating a "mission statement" that he felt the series had always been missing. Alexis Gunderson of Paste agreed that the series had "finally found the story it was meant to tell", with the time jump setting up the season to be the best of the series so far with a focus on the "purest ideals of the Federation" such as the importance of connection, diplomacy, and hope. Daniel Schroeder at Slate said the season's separation from franchise staples was like watching "Star Trek: Voyager 2.0" and was "satisfyingly Trek", while Richard Edwards of GamesRadar+ felt the season was an even bolder departure from the franchise than Voyager, leaving behind so many recognizable Star Trek elements that it actually feels like a fresh start. James Whitbrook of Gizmodo found it ironic that it took moving so far into the future for the series to feel more like The Original Series, something that Jamie Lovett of ComicBook.com agreed with, saying the setting was a return to the "roots" of The Original Series, and made the Star Trek galaxy feel bigger and more dangerous than it had before. He said this was the most confident season in terms of storytelling, with a clear purpose and mission for the characters. Kayti Burt of Den of Geek praised the move for giving the series a "much-needed narrative reset" while keeping the characters from the previous seasons, and TV Insider's Matt Roush felt the new setting had enlivened the entire franchise. Devon Maloney at Vulture said the season would now succeed or fail on its own merits. Craig Elvy of Screen Rant felt it made the most of the new setting by "revel[ing] in the freedom of a fresh timeline, able to introduce planets, characters and storylines without worrying whether it'll contradict something Spock said in the 1960s". Writing for The Verge, Joshua Rivera said the season's reset would appeal to fans of the series as well as new viewers.

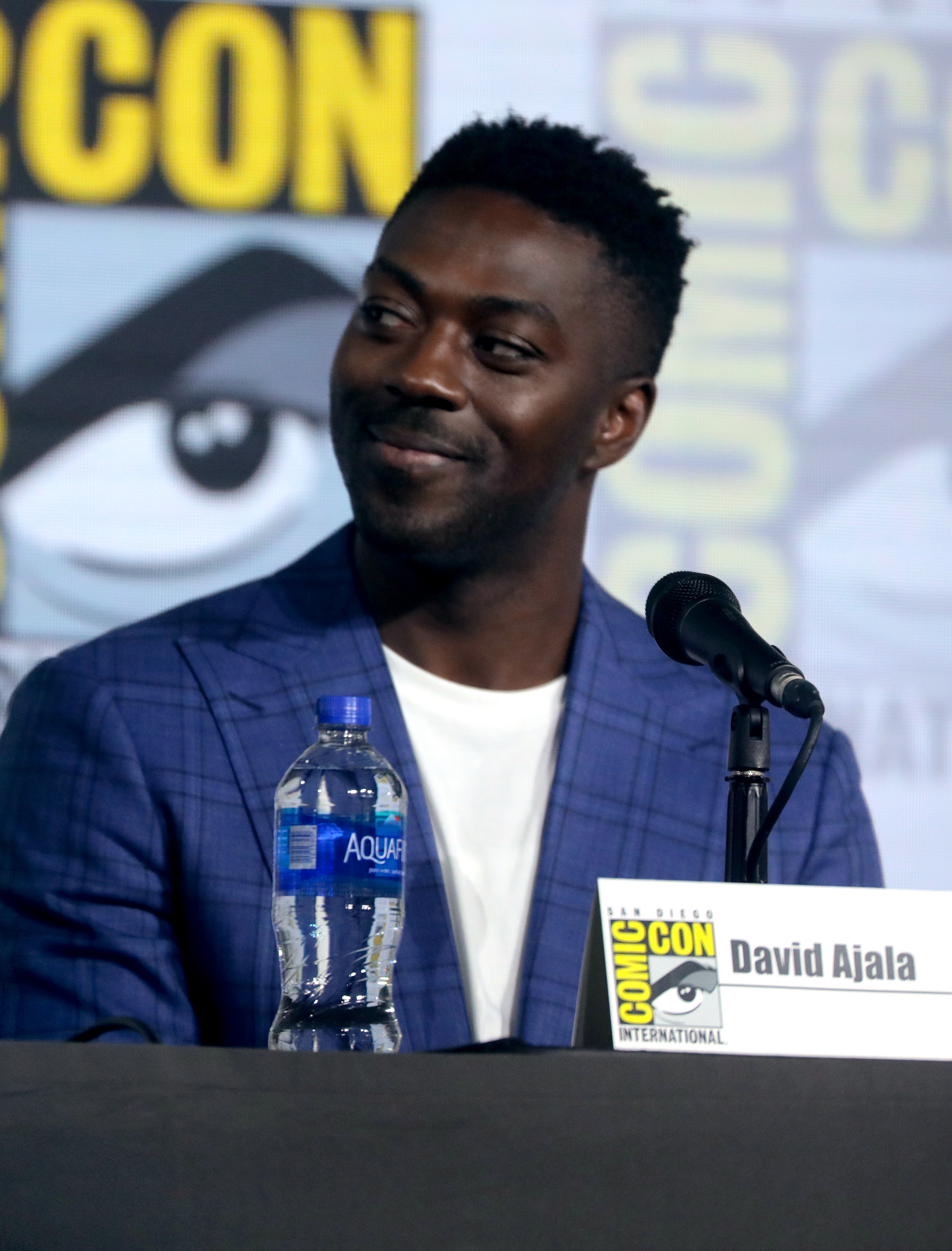
David Ajala was one of several new cast members to receive praise from critics, who compared his character to Han Solo from Star Wars.

Alex Zalben of Decider said the characters shine and hold the season together, with the whole ensemble "hit[ting] its groove". The Daily Dot's Gavia Baker-Whitelaw felt the series had one of the best casts in the franchise, and Katie Cox at Ars Technica said the cast sold the season's story. Lacy Baugher of Den of Geek felt the main cast "gelled" during the season in a way that they did not before, attributing this to their shared experiences moving to the future, while Elvy said spending more time with the bridge crew made them more interesting. He also praised the new cast members, with the introductions of Ajala, del Barrio, and Alexander in particular being praised by many critics. Samantha Nelson of Polygon felt Adira and Gray became accessories to the relationship between Stamets and Culber, but said there was potential for a more meaningful story with the pair in the next season, while Maloney felt Adira and Gray's storyline was the highlight of the season, saying, "If any storyline calls for Discovery's signature Feelings™ treatment, it's the one about lost, lonely ghost kids finding a family". Zalben and Cox both praised Saru's role, with Cox specifically calling out Jones's ability to portray Saru through the prosthetics. Martin-Green received praise from many critics for her performance, but Zack Handlen at The A.V. Club criticized the fact that the series continued to revolve around Burnham, and both Nelson and Maloney felt Saru was sidelined by the season to allow for Burnham's character development. Baugher said there was a sense of inevitability regarding Burnham becoming captain of the Discovery, and Edwards said the whole series had been building to that moment. He criticized the fact that Burnham effectively becomes a superhero to save the day almost on her own, with help from a deus ex machina ending. Maloney said he wanted to celebrate Burnham's promotion to captain, but felt it happened without her growing as a character or learning from her mistakes. In contrast, Elvy said Burnham had developed into a better protagonist by the end of the season, retaining her rebellious side while becoming more vulnerable and accessible to the audience.

Christian Blauvelt of IndieWire and Burt both said the season was the best looking of the series, especially praising the work of Osunsanmi and the Iceland locations for the first two episodes, and Blauvelt felt it could be the best looking of the franchise as a whole. Matthew Carey Salyer, writing for Forbes, compared the new production design to Blade Runner, while several reviewers drew comparisons to Star Wars. Sam Thielman at The Guardian was positive about this, highlighting the fun that is added by the Star Wars-esque "double-crosses, shootouts and ramshackle spaceships" in the season. Several critics compared Book to the Star Wars character Han Solo, while Edwards felt the alien characters looked more like Star Wars aliens than Star Trek ones. Cox was more critical, describing the setting as a "network-safe" version of the Mad Max franchise. Baker-Whitelaw did not think the design was advanced enough to realistically be 900 years beyond the setting of the first two seasons. She felt the initial depiction of a "generic cyberpunk city with neon holograms and black leather costumes" would fit within Star Trek: Picard. Collura criticized the Emerald Chain as uninteresting villains for the season. Elvy agreed that they would not go down as classic characters, but felt they allowed the season to explore more episodic stories than if it had a more imposing villain.

Critics discussed the season's parallels with the real world, something that Lovett said was done by all the best Star Trek series. He compared the lack of dilithium to the dwindling supply of fossil fuels in the modern world. Collura said it was a "thinly veiled analog for our own state of being", while Salyer said the season was a "striking reflection of our common social isolation over the past year". Burt said Star Trek gives hope that real-world problems can be solved and this was especially welcome during the COVID-19 pandemic and the 2020 United States presidential election. Maloney agreed, stating, "Not to be dramatic, but the world really needs Star Trek to be great right now." Thielman said the season was the most thoughtful of the series so far, and Melanie McFarland from Salon felt it showed how to carry on from adversity, which was appropriate following the 2016 United States presidential election. Collura said the secret behind the Burn being the grief of a child was a great concept, as did Edwards who thought it was a "classic Trek twist". Authors and commentators Tom Fitzgerald and Lorenzo Marquez felt the series understood what Star Trek was about more than some of its detractors gave it credit for, but criticized its continued focus on emotional characters over science, diplomacy, and problem-solving. Handlen also criticized the series' reliance on emotional moments and felt the season was "pretty much the same show we left behind in season two, for better and worse". Several critics felt the season's conflicts were given too-easy solutions. Both Pat Brown at Slant Magazine and Cox criticized it as taking the "safe" options, and Brown said it would be more in the spirit of Star Trek to move on from the Federation than try to restore it. Baker-Whitelaw was critical of the "one-note political issues" and their representation as a "tiresome season-wide arc about saving the galaxy", while Collura questioned what the season actually revealed about the loss of hope and stated: "Right now things seem worse than ever in the real world, while all Discovery's problems were solved in 13 episodes flat". Nelson said the writers had introduced complex storylines and ideas and then wrapped them up with "feel-good simplicity", undermining the exploration of key ideas such as resource scarcity, colonialism, trauma, the burdens of leadership, and gender identity. In contrast, Whitbrook said the theme of hope was a "bright, consistent core" throughout the season, something that the first two seasons were missing in his opinion, and he praised how the characters were rewarded at the end of the season for having hope. He said this proved that modern incarnations of Star Trek could still have the "simple, optimistic core" of early franchise iterations. Baugher also felt the season affirmed its central messages by the end.

=== Accolades ===
The season is one of 117 television series that received the ReFrame Stamp for the years 2020 to 2021. The stamp is awarded by the gender equity coalition ReFrame as a "mark of distinction" for film and television projects that are proven to have gender-balanced hiring, with stamps being awarded to projects that hire female-identifying people, especially women of color, in four out of eight critical areas of their production.

Year	Award	Category	Recipient	Result	Ref.
2021	Critics' Choice Super Awards	Best Science Fiction/Fantasy Series	Star Trek: Discovery	Nominated	
2021	Critics' Choice Super Awards	Best Actress in a Science Fiction/Fantasy Series	Sonequa Martin-Green	Nominated	
2021	Directors Guild of Canada	Best Production Design – Dramatic Series	Phillip Barker (for "That Hope Is You, Part 1")	Nominated	
2021	Dragon Awards	Best Science Fiction or Fantasy TV Series	Star Trek: Discovery	Nominated	
2021	GLAAD Media Awards	Outstanding Drama Series	Star Trek: Discovery	Won	
2021	Golden Reel Awards	Outstanding Achievement in Sound Editing – Episodic Long Form – Effects/Foley	Matthew E. Taylor, Tim Farrell, Harry Cohen, Michael Schapiro, Clay Weber, Darrin Mann, Alyson Dee Moore, and Chris Moriana (for "That Hope Is You, Part 1")	Nominated	
2021	Hollywood Music in Media Awards	Best Original Score in a TV Show/Limited Series	Jeff Russo	Nominated	
2021	Primetime Creative Arts Emmy Awards	Outstanding Prosthetic Makeup	Glenn Hetrick, Mike Smithson, Michael O'Brien, Ken Culver, Hugo Villasenor, and Chris Bridges (for "That Hope Is You, Part 1")	Nominated	
2021	Primetime Creative Arts Emmy Awards	Outstanding Period And/Or Character Makeup (Non-Prosthetic)	Shauna Llewellyn and Faye Crasto (for "Terra Firma, Part 2")	Nominated	
2021	Primetime Creative Arts Emmy Awards	Outstanding Sound Editing For A Comedy Or Drama Series (One Hour)	Matthew E. Taylor, Tim Farrell, Harry Cohen, Michael Schapiro, Darrin Mann, Clay Weber, Moira Marquis, Alyson Dee Moore, and Chris Moriana (for "That Hope Is You, Part 1")	Nominated	
2021	Primetime Creative Arts Emmy Awards	Outstanding Special Visual Effects In A Single Episode	Jason Michael Zimmerman, Ante Dekovic, Aleksandra Kochoska, Charles Collyer, Alexander Wood, Ivan Kondrup Jensen, Kristen Prahl, Toni Pykalaniemi, and Leslie Chung (for "Su'Kal")	Won	
2021	Saturn Awards	Best Science Fiction Television Series	Star Trek: Discovery	Won	
2021	Saturn Awards	Best Actress on Television	Sonequa Martin-Green	Nominated	
2021	Saturn Awards	Best Supporting Actor on Television	Doug Jones	Won	
2021	Visual Effects Society Awards	Outstanding Visual Effects in a Photoreal Episode	Jason Michael Zimmerman, Aleksandra Kochoska, Ante Dekovic, and Ivan Kondrup Jensen (for "Su'Kal")	Nominated	
2021	Women's Image Network Awards	Outstanding Actress Drama Series	Sonequa Martin-Green	Tie	
