= Shadow (comics) =

Shadow, in comics, may refer to:

- The Shadow, a fictional character that originated in a series of pulp magazines who also appeared in a number of comic strips and comic books
- Shadow-X, an alternative version of the X-Men
- Shadow the Hedgehog, a Sonic the Hedgehog character who has appeared in the Sonic comics
- Shadows (comics), an Image Comics limited series

It may also refer to:

- Crypt of Shadows, a Marvel Comics horror anthology comic
- Dark Shadows, a comic book series based on the TV series, published by Gold Key Comics
- Shadow Cabinet (comics), a Milestone Comics superhero tean
- Shadowcat, an alias used by Kitty Pryde
- Shadowclaw, a Marvel Comics character from New Exiles
- Shadow Dancer, a Marvel 2099 character
- Shadowdragon, a DC Comics character
- Shadows Fall (comics), a 1994 Vertigo limited series
- Shadowhawk, an Image Comics character
- Shadow Hunter (comics), a Virgin Comics series
- Shadow Initiative, a black-ops group in Marvel Comics
- Shadow King, a Marvel Comics supervillain
- Shadowknight, a Marvel Comics character from Moon Knight
- Shadow Lady, a manga written and drawn by Masakazu Katsura
- Shadow Lass, a DC Comics superhero and member of the Legion of Super-Heroes.
- Shadowman (comics), a Valiant Comics character
- Shadowpact, a DC Comics group
- Shadowqueen, a Marvel Comics character who has appeared in Doctor Strange
- Shadow Riders (comics), a Marvel UK mini-series
- Shadow Stalker, a Marvel Comics character from Heroes for Hire
- Shadowstorm, a DC Comics character and dark counterpart of Firestorm
- Shadowstryke, a DC Comics character
- Shadow Thief, two DC Comics supervillains
- Shadow War, a Milestone Comic crossover
- Shadowoman, an alias for the Marvel Comics character usually known as Sepulchre
- Storm Shadow (G.I. Joe), a G.I. Joe character who has appeared in the comic book spin-offs, including his own series

== See also ==
- Shadow (disambiguation)
