= Shado =

Shado or SHADO may refer to:

- SHADO (Supreme Headquarters, Alien Defence Organisation), a fictional organization in the Gerry Anderson UFO television series
- Shado (comics), comic book character, an antagonist of DC Comics' Green Arrow
- Shado Vao, film character, see list of Star Wars Legends characters

== See also ==
- Shadoe Stevens, the host of American Top 40
- Shadow (disambiguation)
