= Shadow Lake =

Shadow Lake can refer to:

- Shadow Lake (Kawartha Lakes), Ontario, Canada
- Shadow Lake, at Musselman Lake, Ontario, Canada
- Shadow Lake, Washington, a census-designated place (CDP) in the United States
- Shadow Lake Dam, Monmouth County, New Jersey, United States
- Shadow Lake Formation, a geological unit in Ontario, Canada

== See also ==
- Shadow (disambiguation)
