= Incremental update =

Incremental update may refer to:

- Incremental backup
- Incremental computing
- Incremental data loading, a technique which ca be based on change data capture
