= Shadowing =

Shadowing may refer to:

- Shadow fading in wireless communication, caused by obstacles
- File shadowing, to provide an exact copy of or to mirror a set of data
- Job shadowing, learning tasks by first-hand observation of daily behavior
- Projective shadowing, a process by which shadows are added to 3D computer graphics
- Variable shadowing, a variable naming issue in computer programming
- Speech shadowing, a type of experiment in psycholinguistics
- Nuclear shadowing, an effect in nuclear and particle physics
- Surveillance, following someone's movements

== See also ==
- Shadow (disambiguation)
- The shadowing lemma, a key result in the theory of dynamical systems
- Shading
