= Star Trek: Section 31 =

2025 American science fiction television film

- Promotional poster
- Genre: Drama; Science fiction
- Based on: Star Trek by Gene Roddenberry
- Screenplay by: Craig Sweeny
- Story by: Bo Yeon Kim; Erika Lippoldt
- Directed by: Olatunde Osunsanmi
- Starring: Michelle Yeoh; Omari Hardwick; Sam Richardson; Robert Kazinsky; Kacey Rohl; Sven Ruygrok; James Hiroyuki Liao; Humberly González; Joe Pingue
- Music by: Jeff Russo
- Country of origin: United States
- Original language: English

Production
- Executive producers: Alex Kurtzman; Olatunde Osunsanmi; Craig Sweeny; Michelle Yeoh; Aaron Baiers; Frank Siracusa; John Weber; Eugene Roddenberry; Trevor Roth
- Producer: Ted Miller
- Production location: Toronto, Canada
- Cinematography: Glen Keenan
- Editor: Bartholomew Burcham
- Running time: 95 minutes
- Production companies: Secret Hideout; Action This Day!; Roddenberry Entertainment; CBS Studios

Original release
- Network: Paramount+
- Release: January 24, 2025

Related
- Star Trek films; Star Trek: Discovery

Star Trek: Section 31 is a 2025 American science fiction television film directed by Olatunde Osunsanmi and written by Craig Sweeny for the streaming service Paramount+. It is the first television film, and the fourteenth film overall, in the Star Trek franchise and part of executive producer Alex Kurtzman's expanded Star Trek Universe. A spin-off from the series Star Trek: Discovery, the film is set in the franchise's "lost era" between the Star Trek: The Original Series films and the series Star Trek: The Next Generation. It follows Philippa Georgiou as she works with Section 31, a secret division of Starfleet tasked with protecting the United Federation of Planets, and must face the sins of her past.

Michelle Yeoh stars as Georgiou, reprising her role from Discovery. Development on a spin-off series with Yeoh was confirmed in January 2019, but production was delayed by the COVID-19 pandemic. A different Discovery spin-off series, Star Trek: Strange New Worlds, was then prioritized. Section 31 was redeveloped into a film, which was announced in April 2023. Omari Hardwick, Sam Richardson, Robert Kazinsky, Kacey Rohl, Sven Ruygrok, James Hiroyuki Liao, Humberly González, and Joe Pingue also star. Filming took place in Toronto, Canada, from January to March 2024. The film was produced by CBS Studios in association with Secret Hideout, Action This Day!, and Roddenberry Entertainment.

Star Trek: Section 31 was released on Paramount+ on January 24, 2025. Many critics gave it a negative review, with several finding it to be the worst entry in the Star Trek franchise. The film received several accolades, including a Primetime Creative Arts Emmy Award nomination for its sound editing. It was nominated for five Golden Raspberry Awards.

== Plot ==
In the Mirror Universe, an alternate universe governed by the ruthless Terran Empire, a teenage Philippa Georgiou returns home from a deadly contest to determine the next Emperor. She reveals to her family that she befriended a boy named San and they defeated the other young contestants together. To claim the throne, Georgiou cuts all ties to her previous life by poisoning her family. Imperial officials arrive with San, who failed to kill his own family, and Georgiou enslaves him as she ascends the throne.

In the Prime Universe in the early 24th century, agents of the secret Starfleet division Section 31 are sent to the space station Baraam outside Federation space. Georgiou, having traveled to the Prime Universe and joined Starfleet for a time, poses as Baraam proprietress "Madame du Franc". Section 31 agent Alok Sahar convinces Georgiou to join his team, which includes: Melle, an irresistible Deltan; Quasi, a shapeshifting Chameloid; Zeph, the user of a mechanical exoskeleton; Rachel Garrett, a no-nonsense Starfleet officer; and Fuzz, a microscopic Nanokin who pilots a robotic suit that looks like a Vulcan. They intercept arms dealer Dada Noe on Baraam and Georgiou puts a "phase pod" on the weapon he is selling so only those with their own phase pod can touch it. A masked figure with a phase pod takes the weapon and kills Melle. Before the intruder transports off the station, Georgiou recognizes the weapon as the "Godsend" which she had ordered the development of in the Mirror Universe. It is designed to destroy everything in its path.

Alok gains Georgiou's trust by revealing his backstory: he is originally from the 20th century and his family were murdered during the Eugenics Wars by a genetically-enhanced warlord named Giri, who enhanced Alok and had him commit atrocities in her name. The pair question Dada Noe in a Section 31 safe house and learn that he is from the Mirror Universe, he stole the Godsend from a weapons facility, and he was selling it to the Terran Empire who are planning to enter the Prime Universe through a wormhole and conquer it. When the safe house is sabotaged and their ship is destroyed, the Section 31 team believes the masked man was tipped off by one of their own. Zeph disappears and the others suspect him of being the mole, but they find him dead and evidence implicates Garrett as the killer. Georgiou deduces that Fuzz infiltrated Zeph's exoskeleton, forced him to sabotage their communications and then kill himself, and planted the evidence. Fuzz is transported away, but first he reveals that San—who Georgiou thought was dead—is the masked man.

The team uses an abandoned garbage scow to follow San. Quasi and Garrett take out San's shields with the scow's tractor beam while Georgiou and Alok transport onto his ship. Alok fights Fuzz's robotic suit, but Fuzz leaves the suit to attack the scow. San intends to destroy the Prime Universe with the Godsend and create his own empire that will be ruled with "righteous mercy" in contrast to Georgiou's cruel dictatorship. As the pair fight, the Godsend is inadvertently activated. Garrett rigs an explosive from the scow's garbage which Quasi jettisons into space, seemingly killing Fuzz. San tries to stab Georgiou but she blocks him and he fatally stabs himself, dying in her arms. Alok and Georgiou decide to fly San's ship through the wormhole, sacrificing themselves while directing the Godsend into the Mirror Universe. Quasi transports them off the ship at the last moment.

Three weeks later, the surviving members of the team reconvene on Baraam. They are joined by Fuzz's wife, Wisp, who pilots an identical Vulcan robotic suit and believes her husband survived the explosion. "Control", the director of Section 31, contacts the team about their next mission which is on Turkana IV.

== Cast ==
- Michelle Yeoh as Philippa Georgiou:
  The leader of the Terran Empire in the Mirror Universe who has travelled to the Prime Universe and joined Starfleet. Yeoh hoped the character would not lose her "edge" as Emperor Georgiou, despite learning lessons about compassion and humanity during her time on Star Trek: Discovery. Georgiou left that series and travelled to a different point in the Star Trek timeline, where she is the owner of the Baraam, a nightclub outside Federation space. Miku Martineau portrays a young Georgiou.
- Omari Hardwick as Alok:
  A Section 31 agent from the 20th century who is a "strategic mastermind" with "a lot of mental issues". Alok wants Georgiou to pay for her past by joining his team for a covert mission.
- Sam Richardson as Quasi:
  A Section 31 agent who is "disinterested in the delusion of 'utopia'". Quasi is a Chameloid, the shapeshifting alien species introduced in the film Star Trek VI: The Undiscovered Country (1991).
- Robert Kazinsky as Zeph: A Section 31 agent who lives and works in a mechanical exoskeleton
- Kacey Rohl as Rachel Garrett: The future captain of the USS Enterprise-C, who represents Starfleet on the Section 31 team. Rohl described Garrett at the start of the film as a disciplined, rule-following officer who grows more comfortable operating in moral gray areas as the story progresses.
- Sven Ruygrok as Fuzz and Wisp: Microscopic Nanokin Section 31 agents who pilot robotic suits that look like Vulcans
- James Hiroyuki Liao as San: Georgiou's former love and rival for the Terran throne who she enslaved on her ascension. James Huang portrays a young San.
- Humberly González as Melle: A Section 31 agent who uses her "irresistible magnetism" to the division's benefit, unlike other Deltans in Starfleet who take an oath of celibacy
- Joe Pingue as Dada Noe: An arms dealer from the Mirror Universe

Additionally, Jamie Lee Curtis makes a cameo appearance as "Control", the cybernetically-enhanced director of Section 31.

== Production ==
=== Background ===
During production on the first season of Star Trek: Discovery, special guest star Michelle Yeoh suggested to executive producer Alex Kurtzman that they make a spin-off series featuring her character Philippa Georgiou. Yeoh made the suggestion because she loved playing the character, and because she wanted to be a role model for young Asian women. Kurtzman was enthusiastic about the idea, but was unsure if a spin-off would be feasible since Discovery had not yet been released. After Yeoh's performance received positive responses, the writers of Discovery began exploring the black ops division Section 31 as part of her storyline in the second season. That led to further discussions about a potential spin-off series. In June 2018, after becoming sole showrunner of Discovery, Kurtzman signed a five-year overall deal with CBS Television Studios to expand the Star Trek franchise beyond Discovery to several new series, miniseries, and animated series. Yeoh was in talks to star in a spin-off series by November, which was expected to follow her character's Section 31 storyline.

The streaming service CBS All Access confirmed it was moving ahead with development on the spin-off in January 2019, with Discovery writers Bo Yeon Kim and Erika Lippoldt set as writers and showrunners. Kurtzman said the project was intended to be an ongoing series rather than a limited miniseries, and added that Kim and Lippoldt had begun writing while still working on the second season of Discovery. It was his hope that the new series would be ready to begin production once the third season of Discovery was completed. In March 2019, CBS Television Studios president David Stapf said the spin-off would be produced in Toronto, Canada, like Discovery, but it was "a good couple of years away", with Kurtzman expecting it to be released in 2021 or 2022. Yeoh confirmed that she was working on the series the next month. Kurtzman said Discovery's writers were aware that their portrayal of Section 31 was inconsistent with the organization's introduction in the series Star Trek: Deep Space Nine and the spin-off would show its evolution from their version to its original depiction, specifically why it becomes an "underground organization". Kurtzman cited Killing Eve and the Mission: Impossible franchise as influences and said Georgiou would be "a protagonist who's entirely unreliable. At the end of the day, she's going to do the right thing, but in the exact wrong way." In July, Shazad Latif indicated that he could be reprising his Discovery role of Ash Tyler in the spin-off. A writers' room had been established by the end of November, and Kurtzman said the completed pilot script "occupies an area of the Trek universe that's never really been explored geographically. It has a new mythology to it". He also compared the series to the film Unforgiven (1992).

By the end of January 2020, the series was set to be filmed from May to November 2020, in the newly opened CBS Stages Canada in Mississauga, near Toronto. In February 2020, the series was reportedly renewed for a second season to allow the first two seasons to be filmed back-to-back. Production on the third season of Discovery was completed that month, but filming on the spin-off was delayed by Yeoh's commitment to the film Shang-Chi and the Legend of the Ten Rings (2021) which was set to be filmed from January to May. Plans to instead begin filming the spin-off series in May were soon delayed by the COVID-19 pandemic, with Kurtzman later stating that their plans for the series had been "thrown completely into whack" by the pandemic. By August 2020, Kim and Lippoldt were working with Discovery writer Craig Sweeny to build the series; Sweeny previously served as showrunner on the Kurtzman-produced series Limitless. Kurtzman said the writers had been able to "get quite ahead in scripts" due to the production delays. A month later, frequent Star Trek director Jonathan Frakes said Kim and Lippoldt were optimistic that the series would be made despite work starting on a different Discovery spin-off series, Star Trek: Strange New Worlds. Frakes had asked to direct Section 31's pilot episode but said a female director would likely be hired since the series was primarily a "woman's story". In March 2021, ViacomCBS announced that CBS All Access would be expanded and rebranded as Paramount+.

The third season of Discovery writes out Georgiou in the two-part episode "Terra Firma", released in December 2020, which was co-written by Kim and Lipoldt. They said the character's storyline for the season was developed with "a lot of care", and it ends with her being transported to an unknown place and time where the spin-off is set. Yeoh said she hoped work on the spin-off could continue "very soon". In February 2021, Kurtzman said there was still conversations taking place about making the series, and he was optimistic about it eventually happening due to the already completed scripts. However, he said the spin-off was unlikely to be added to Paramount+'s slate of Star Trek Universe series until one of the existing five series came to an end. In February 2022, Kurtzman said the Section 31 spin-off was still in development and his team were planning Star Trek series that would be released two or three years later. The series was expected to get a pickup from Paramount+ soon after. In May, Kurtzman said he and his team were focusing on developing Section 31 and Star Trek: Starfleet Academy as the next two Star Trek series. No further announcements had been made by January 2023, when Paramount Streaming's chief programming officer Tanya Giles said the spin-off was still in development.

=== Development ===
In March 2023, after revealing that Discovery would be ending with its fifth season, Kurtzman expressed interest in making more limited event series and television films for the Star Trek franchise rather than just traditional ongoing television series. He reiterated that the project was still in development. A month later, Paramount+ announced that Star Trek: Section 31 was moving forward as a streaming "event film" instead of a series. Yeoh was attached to reprise her role in the film, which was written by Sweeny and set to be directed by Discovery executive producer Olatunde Osunsanmi. The film was described as "Mission: Impossible meets Guardians of the Galaxy". Kurtzman had begun converting the project from a series to a film in mid-2022, after realizing that Yeoh could win an Academy Award for her role in the film Everything Everywhere All at Once (2022) and her schedule would likely get much busier. He and other executives had already been interested in expanding the franchise to event projects and were concerned about oversaturating the franchise with too many ongoing television series.

Production was initially expected to begin in late 2023, reportedly in October, before it was delayed by the 2023 Hollywood labor disputes. In May 2023, Latif said he had not heard if he would be involved in the film but expressed interest in reprising his role. In mid-October, after the 2023 Writers Guild of America strike ended, Kurtzman said work on the film was underway again. He announced the start of filming in January 2024, when additional cast members were revealed: Omari Hardwick, Kacey Rohl, Sam Richardson, Sven Ruygrok, Robert Kazinsky, Humberly González, and James Hiroyuki Liao. Rohl plays a young version of Rachel Garrett, who was portrayed by Tricia O'Neil in the Star Trek: The Next Generation episode "Yesterday's Enterprise" where she is the captain of the USS Enterprise-C. Sweeny said viewers would not need to recognize Garrett to enjoy the film as he wanted a "low barrier of entry" for new fans. Osunsanmi told Rohl he wanted her own interpretation of the character rather than an impression of O'Neil's original performance. Osunsanmi said the film's supporting characters had changed from when the project was planned to be a television series, and those rewrites were why Latif was no longer reprising his role. Latif's involvement in the series would have been related to the Temporal Wars from Star Trek: Enterprise. Joe Pingue, Miku Martineau, and Augusto Bitter were also cast in the film.

The film is set in the franchise's "lost era" between the Star Trek: The Original Series films and the series Star Trek: The Next Generation. Osunsanmi said this setting gave them some freedom, but they still had to ensure that the technology and other aspects of the setting were appropriate for the time period. Discussing concerns about making a film focused on Section 31, Sweeny acknowledged that the idea was "almost antagonistic to some of the values of Star Trek" but felt there was room in Star Trek creator Gene Roddenberry's vision for people who do not want to work together on the bridge of a Starfleet ship. Osunsanmi said they "worked really hard to make sure we kept up the ideals of optimism and kept up the ideals of what do we want our society to be in the future". He compared Section 31 to the CIA and secretive government agencies focused on UFOs.

=== Filming ===
Filming began at Pinewood Toronto Studios in Toronto, Canada, on January 29, 2024, under the working title Dovercourt. Pinewood Toronto Studios is where Discovery was produced, and sets from that series were repurposed for the film. Filming for Section 31 took place concurrently with production on the third season of Strange New Worlds at nearby CBS Stages Canada, and the two productions shared use of visual effects company Pixomondo's Toronto video wall stage for virtual production. Rohl said the combination of practical sets and the video wall meant she rarely had to perform opposite a bare backdrop, joking that the approach meant "it wasn't a lot of quietly acting opposite a tennis ball". Glen Keenan returned from Discovery and Strange New Worlds as cinematographer for the film.

Osunsanmi said he pushed the crew harder than he would when directing an episode of a television series because the whole project was over within a few months rather than the extended "marathon" schedule of a season of television. He said "we got to push everything to the extreme... emotion, performances, action, you name it". Osunsanmi was also able to breakdown the entire script and map out how he wanted to "tie everything together by the end". He chose to reconsider his creative and visual approach so it would be "new and fresh" rather than approaching the film in the same way that he had episodes of Discovery. He noted that Kurtzman wanted each Star Trek project to have its own "flavor". Ahead of filming, Osunsanmi had the cast study films including the Mission: Impossible series and Crimson Tide (1995) as reference material, and the cast worked extensively with stunt coordinator Chris McGuire to choreograph the film's action sequences before production began. Production on Section 31 was expected to take six weeks, ending on March 13; Kazinsky announced the end of filming on March 21.

=== Post-production ===
The final cut of the film was locked by mid-October 2024, with a runtime of just under two hours. Additional dialogue recording (ADR), visual effects, and color grading were underway at that time.

== Music ==
In January 2020, Discovery composer Jeff Russo expressed interest in also composing the score for Section 31, but said that may not be possible due to his workload and the large number of Star Trek series being produced around the same time. He suggested that he could oversee other composers for Section 31 and other series if Kurtzman asked him to. Russo was confirmed to be composing the film's score in July 2024. The soundtrack album was released on February 14, 2025.

== Marketing ==
Kurtzman, Osunsanmi, Hardwick, Richardson, and Rohl promoted the film during a "Star Trek Universe" panel at San Diego Comic-Con in July 2024. A teaser trailer was shown during the event, introduced by Yeoh via a video message. It was also released online. James Hibberd at The Hollywood Reporter said the teaser had a "rebellious tone" for the franchise, beginning with a warning from Starfleet about "misfit content", using a different style of title graphics from previous Star Trek projects, highlighting Georgiou's history of murder and calling her a "bad bitch", and being set to the contemporary song "Formation" by Beyoncé. Christian Blauvelt of IndieWire and James Whitbrook of Gizmodo both noted the different tone from previous Star Trek projects, with Blauvelt calling it "a vibe like we've never gotten from Star Trek" and highlighting the use of the term "bad bitch". Michael Walsh at Nerdist said the teaser was "incredibly fun", while Mick Joest at CinemaBlend praised the action and cast. He questioned why a Star Trek film starring Yeoh was not receiving a theatrical release. Molly Templeton of Reactor was baffled by the trailer's "wacky" tone and "out-of-place Beyoncé track". She hoped the young Georgiou scenes did not mean the film would be an origin story, and also hoped it did right by its supporting cast. The film was promoted by Hardwick, Rohl, Kazinsky, and Osunsanmi during another "Star Trek Universe" panel at New York Comic Con in October. The release date was announced and Yeoh again appeared via video message.

== Release ==
Star Trek: Section 31 was released on the streaming service Paramount+ on January 24, 2025, in the United States and all other countries where the service is available. The film was released on DVD, Blu-ray, Ultra HD, and digital platforms in the U.S. on April 29. The release includes more than an hour of bonus features, including a gag reel and featurettes on the production design, main characters, stunts, and props.

== Reception ==
=== Viewership ===
Nielsen Media Research, which records streaming viewership on U.S. television screens, estimated that Section 31 was watched for 170 million minutes during the week ending January 26. This put it eighth on the company's list of top streaming films for the week.

=== Critical response ===
Many critics gave the film a negative review, with several finding it to be the worst entry in the Star Trek franchise. It became the lowest rated Star Trek film or television series on the review aggregator website Rotten Tomatoes, which reported a 23% approval score and an average rating of 3.00 out of 10 based on 52 reviews. The website's critical consensus reads, "Beam it out of here, Scotty", jokingly referencing the popular Star Trek misquote "Beam me up, Scotty". Metacritic, which uses a weighted average, assigned a score of 37 out of 100 based on 16 reviews, indicating "generally unfavorable" reviews.

Daniel Cooper of Engadget said Section 31 was the "single worst thing to carry the Star Trek name". Gizmodo's James Whitbrook said it was a "mediocre action movie, and an even worse Star Trek one", while Jordan Hoffman at IGN called it a "lousy, uninteresting caper picture" and criticized the visual effects, acting, dialogue, characters, and overall visuals. Hoffman said the film would "infuriate Star Trek fans and bore everyone else". Reviewing it for Slate, J. Bryan Lowder said Section 31 had little connection to the Star Trek franchise and inappropriate comedy more suited to the films of Marvel Studios like Guardians of the Galaxy. He said all aspects of the film "did [Yeoh] dirty", from costumes and make-up to choreography and dialogue. Similarly, Jeannette Catsoulis of The New York Times found the protagonists to be more akin to superheroes than Star Trek characters and wrote that the film was convoluted and hard to follow. Robert Lloyd of the Los Angeles Times said the project was hurt by the stilted transition to a film from the originally planned series, becoming an overlong pilot episode. Writing for Ars Technica, Andrew Cunningam thought the film would be hard to watch even for fans of Star Trek: Discovery and the franchise in general. He said the script was embarrassing and the performances were ridiculous.

Discussing the film's poor reviews, Rachel Hulshult of Screen Rant gave a list of reasons why she thought they were so negative, including: the noticeable transition from a television series to a film; a boring story; not feeling like a Star Trek series; lacking character development; and wasting Yeoh's return to the franchise. John Orquiola, also at Screen Rant, expressed concern that the negative responses could prevent future Star Trek streaming films from being made. Whitbrook had similar thoughts, saying the franchise needed to prove that the format was viable and would have been "better served if it hadn't started with such a fundamental misfire".

=== Accolades ===
Accolades received by Star Trek: Section 31
Award	Date of ceremony	Category	Recipient(s)	Result	Ref.
Cinema Audio Society Awards	March 7, 2026	Non-Theatrical Motion Pictures or Limited Series	Bill McMillan, Todd M. Grace, Edward C. Carr III, Michael Perfitt, Tami Treadwell, and Darrin Mann	Nominated	
Critics' Choice Super Awards	August 7, 2025	Best Actress in a Science Fiction / Fantasy Series, Limited Series or Made-for-TV Movie	Michelle Yeoh	Nominated	
Golden Raspberry Awards	March 14, 2026	Worst Picture	Star Trek: Section 31	Nominated	
Golden Raspberry Awards	March 14, 2026	Worst Actress	Michelle Yeoh	Nominated	
Golden Raspberry Awards	March 14, 2026	Worst Supporting Actress	Kacey Rohl	Nominated	
Golden Raspberry Awards	March 14, 2026	Worst Director	Olatunde Osunsanmi	Nominated	
Golden Raspberry Awards	March 14, 2026	Worst Screenplay	Craig Sweeny, Bo Yeon Kim, and Erika Lippoldt	Nominated	
Golden Reel Awards	March 8, 2026	Outstanding Achievement in Sound Editing – Non-Theatrical Feature	Matthew E. Taylor, Michael Schapiro, Alex Pugh, Kip Smedley, Andrew Twite, Austin Olivia Kendrick, Sebastian Sheehan Visconti, Darrin Mann, Clay Weber, Alyson Dee Moore, and Katie Rose	Nominated	
Make-Up Artists & Hair Stylists Guild Awards	February 14, 2026	Best Special Make-Up Prosthetics	Glenn Hetrick, Rocky Faulkner, Michele Hetrick, and Nicola Bendrey	Nominated	
NAACP Image Awards	February 28, 2026	Outstanding Directing in a Television Movie, Documentary or Special	Olatunde Osunsanmi	Won	
Primetime Creative Arts Emmy Awards	September 7, 2025	Outstanding Sound Editing For A Limited Or Anthology Series, Movie Or Special	Matthew E. Taylor, Michael Schapiro, Austin Olivia Kendrick, Sebastian Sheehan Visconti, Sean Heissinger, Andrew Twite, Alex Pugh, Kip Smedley, Deron Street, Clay Weber, Moira Marquis, Alyson Moore, and Katie Rose	Nominated	

== Tie-in media ==
A one-shot comic book featuring young Georgiou and titled Star Trek: Section 31 – Emperor Born was released by IDW Publishing on February 26, 2025. It was written by Alyssa Wong with art by Megan Levans.

== Future ==
In March 2024, Yeoh said she was open to making a sequel if the first film was successful. In October, Osunsanmi said "the door is wide open" for additional Section 31 stories to be told after the film's release.
