= Shatto =

Shatto is a surname. Notable people with the surname include:

- Bart Shatto, American theatre actor-singer
- Cindy Shatto (1957–2011), Canadian diver
- Dick Shatto (1933–2003), Canadian football player

== See also ==
- Shatto, West Virginia, an unincorporated community in Jackson County
