= Shadowman =

Shadowman or Shadow Man may refer to:

== Film ==
- Streets of Shadows (1953 film), released as Shadow Man in the U.S.
- Shadow Man (1988 film), a Dutch-British film with Tom Hulce
- Shadow Man (2006 film), a 2006 Steven Seagal film
- Shadow Man (2014 film), an Indian film
- Shadowman (2017 film), a 2017 documentary about street artist Richard Hambleton
- Nuits Rouges or Shadowman, a 1974 film by Georges Franju
- The Shadow Men (1997 film), an American thriller film
- Shadow Men (2017 film), also known as Nos hommes dans l'ouest, a Canadian documentary film

== Television ==
- "The Shadow Man" (The Twilight Zone), a 1985 episode of The Twilight Zone directed by Joe Dante
- "Shadowmen", a 1992 episode of The Young Riders
- The Shadowmen, a fictional race of supernatural characters in the Buffy the Vampire Slayer media franchise

== Video games ==
- Shadow Man (video game), a 1999 video game by Acclaim Entertainment loosely based on the comic book
- Shadow Man: 2econd Coming, a 2002 sequel
- Shadow Man, a boss in Mega Man 3

== Music ==
- Shadowman (Steve Walsh album), 2005
- Shadowman (Link Wray album)
- Shadow Man (Johnny Clegg & Savuka album), 1988
- Shadow Man (Tim Berne album)
- "Shadow Man" (song), a song written by David Bowie in 1971
- "Shadow Man", a song by the Afro Celt Sound System from Volume 3: Further in Time

== Literature ==
- Shadowman (comics), a comic book series and character from Valiant Comics
- Shadowman, a 1993 horror novel by Dennis Etchison
- Shadow Man, a 1996 science fiction novel by Melissa Scott

== Other ==
- The Shadow Man (radio drama), a 1936 Australian radio drama
- Shadowman paintings, street art shadow paintings made by Richard Hambleton in New York City in the early 1980s

== See also ==
- Shadow people, creatures of both modern folklore and paranormal popular culture
