= Michele Hetrick =

American makeup artist

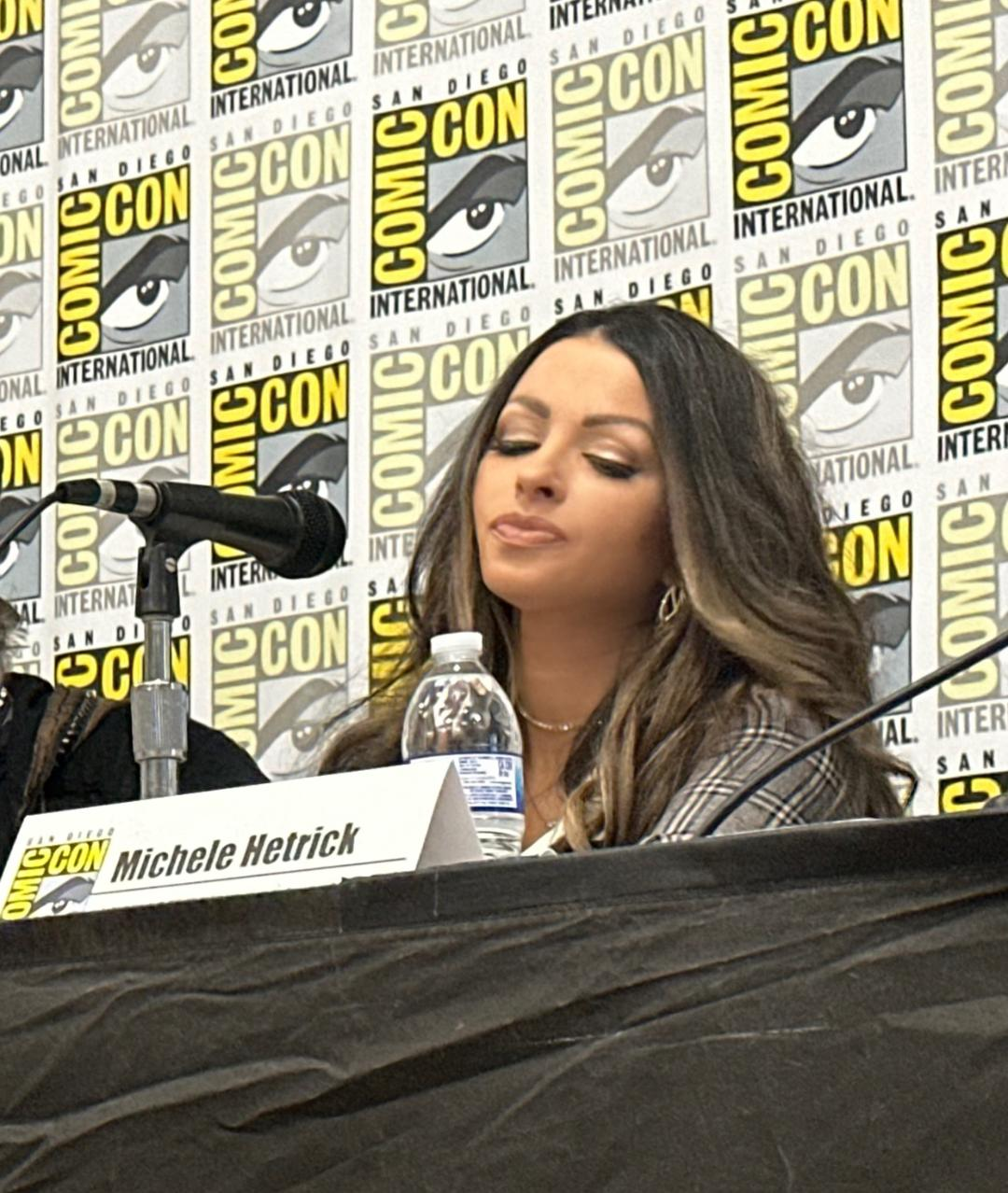
- Michele Hetrick at Comic Con panel
- Born: Westlake Village, California, U.S.
- Occupation: Make-up artist
- Spouse: Glenn Hetrick
- Website: www.alchemyfxstudio.com

Michele Hetrick is an American make-up artist.

== Career ==
Notable TV shows that Michele Hetrick has worked for are Judge Judy, Hot Bench, Cupcake Wars, CSI: Cyber, Agents of S.H.I.E.L.D., Major Crimes, Face Off, Inhumans, Cabinet of Curiosities, Star Trek: Section 31, and all five seasons of Star Trek: Discovery.

Hetrick co-owns Alchemy Studios with her husband. In 2024, Titan Publishing Group released a book titled Star Trek: The Art of Glenn Hetrick's Alchemy Studios, an in-depth illustrated book about the studio featuring art and behind-the-scenes photography, and interviews regarding the studio's work Seasons 1-5 of Star Trek: Discovery.
