= Shadow, Virginia =

Unincorporated community in Virginia, US

Coordinates: 37°20′57″N 76°17′48″W

Shadow is an unincorporated community in Mathews County, in the U. S. state of Virginia.
