= Anne Logston =

American writer

- Occupation: Novelist
- Education: University of Indianapolis
- Notable works: Shadow series

Anne Logston (born February 15, 1962) is an American author of fantasy/adventure novels.

She was born in Indiana and attended the University of Indianapolis, where she received an associate degree in computer science and a B.A. in English. She worked as a legal secretary.

== Works ==
=== Shadow series ===
These are about the "elvan" thief named Shadow, and her niece Jael.

- Shadow. Ace. 1991. ISBN 0-441-75989-0. (1991), (2005 re-issue).
- Shadow Hunt. Ace. 1992. ISBN 0-441-76007-4.
- Shadow Dance. Ace. 1992. ISBN 0-441-75990-4.
- Dagger's Edge. Ace. 1994. ISBN 0-441-00036-3.
- Dagger's Point. Ace. 1995. ISBN 0-441-00134-3.

=== Other novels ===
- Greendaughter. Ace. 1993. ISBN 0-441-30273-4.
- Wild Blood. Ace. 1995. ISBN 0-441-00243-9.
- Guardian's Key. Berkley. 1996. ISBN 0-441-00327-3.
- Firewalk. Ace. 1997. ISBN 0-441-00427-X.
- Waterdance. Ace. 1999. ISBN 0-441-00613-2.
- Exile. Berkley. 1999. ISBN 0-441-00669-8.

Exile is a direct sequel to Guardian's Key, following the life of the original protagonist's daughter.
