= The Shadow (painting) =

Painting by Edmund Leighton

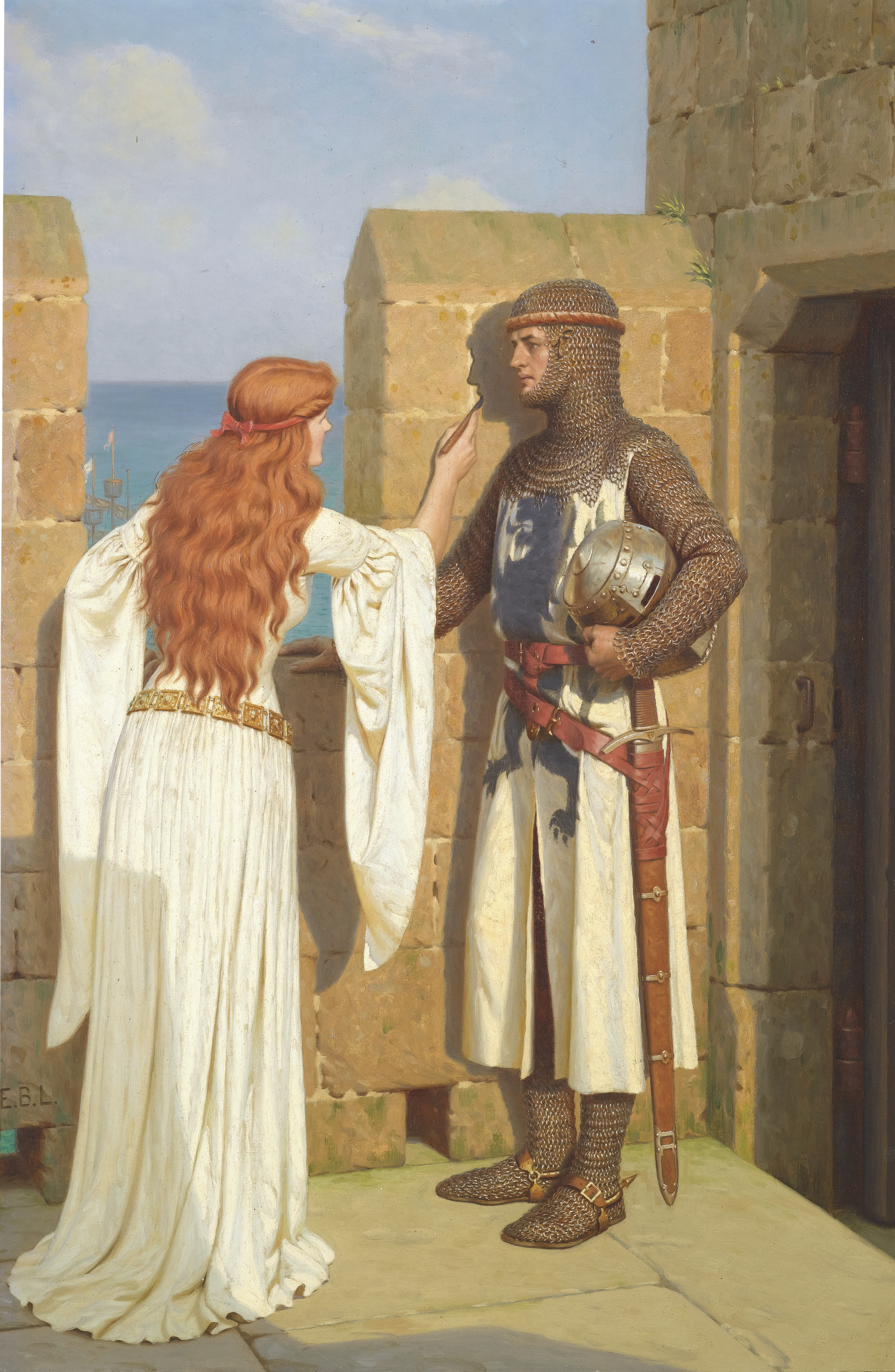
- Artist: Edmund Leighton
- Year: c. 1909
- Medium: Oil on canvas
- Movement: Pre-Raphaelite
- Dimensions: 91 cm × 61 cm (36 in × 24 in)

The Shadow (c. 1909) is a painting by Edmund Blair Leighton.

The Shadow is based upon the Greek myth of Butades; a Corinthian maiden drew the outline of her beloved's shadow cast by the light of a lamp the night before he departed for war. Leighton retold the story in the style of the romanticised Middle Ages, reflecting the concept of courtly love by changing the setting to the battlements of a medieval castle and the morning of (instead of the night before) the man's departure, shown by the ship waiting in the background.

The hair colour of the maiden is not inconsequential or unintentional. While red hair has historically had negative associations, the Pre-Raphaelite Brotherhood, which Leighton was associated with, frequently depicted red-heads in a positive light to further the intentions of their art movement. By the Victorian era, auburn hair was touted as much as blonde hair, a standard of beauty that would have influenced Leighton to depict the medieval maiden as ginger.

As for many of Leighton's paintings, prints and reproductions of The Shadow are popular.

== Description ==
A medieval knight in chainmail and surcoat stands on the battlements of a castle by the sea, holding his helmet under one arm as the other braces him on the wall. He stands straight and still for the red-haired maiden in front of him dressed in a white medieval dress who leans forward to trace the outline of his shadow. The door to the stairs down from the battlemants is slightly ajar, and a ship is waiting for the knight beyond the battlements.

Leighton has snuck his initials into the painting, not with a signature but by making them appear to be carved into the stone.

== Provenance ==
It was not uncommon for old masters to create two or more versions of the same painting for various reasons. Because of this practice, three versions of The Shadow are known:

- one is in the Berman Museum in Anniston, Alabama (formerly the collection of Farley and Germaine Berman, purchased on 3 May 1972 from Sotheby's);
- another is in Cardiff City Hall, acquired when Mrs Annie Fulton of Penarth left part of her residuary estate to the City of Cardiff in 1907;
- and one was sold by Sotheby's for 68,750 GBP to the art dealer M. Newman Ltd on 15 July 2015 in London.

One version of the painting was exhibited at the Royal Academy in 1909.
