= Glenn Hetrick =

American make-up artist (born 1972)

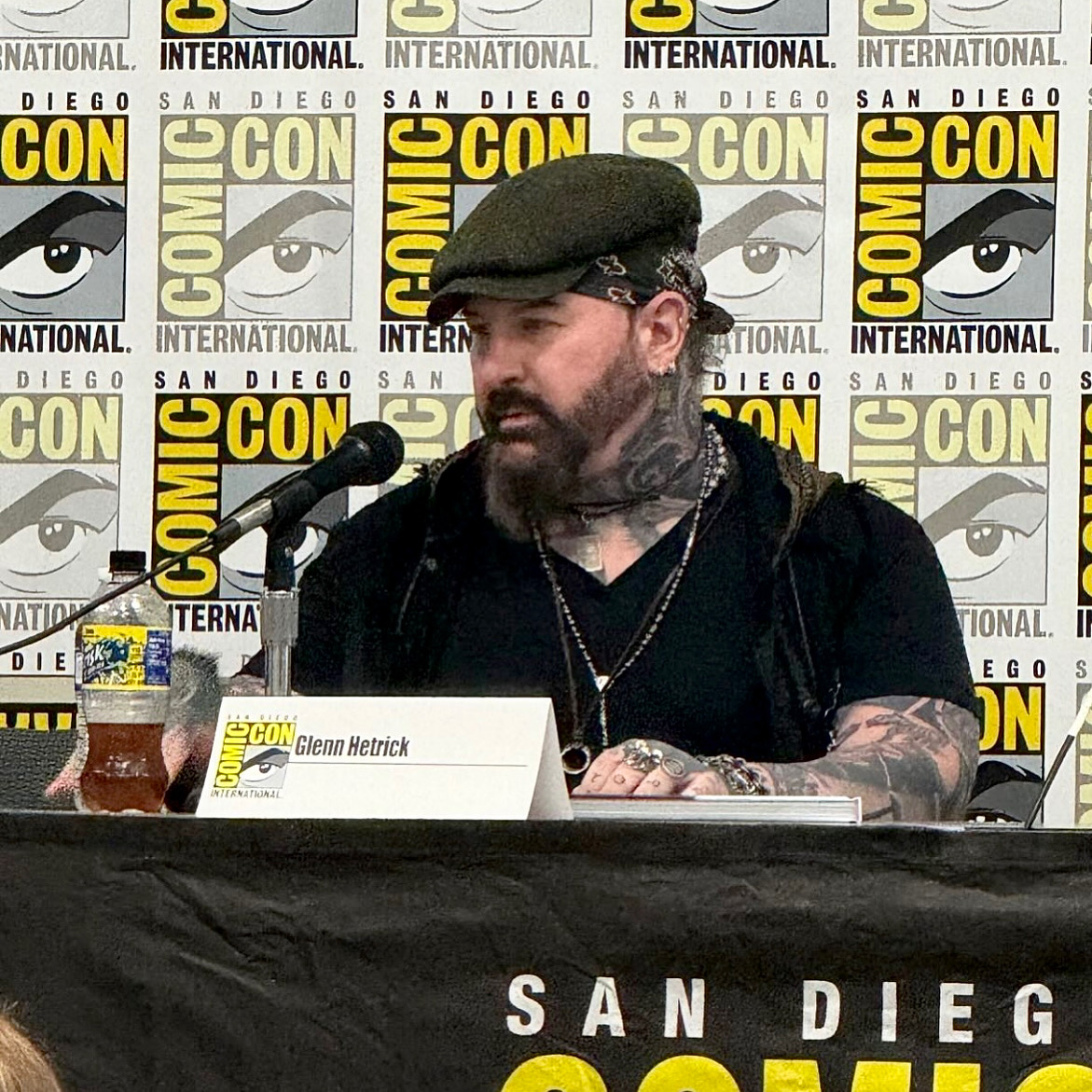
- Hetrick at San Diego Comic Con, 2024
- Born: July 8, 1972 (age 54); Bethlehem, Pennsylvania, U.S.
- Education: York College of Pennsylvania
- Known for: Judge on SyFy's Face Off; Producer; Actor; Prosthetic & special effects makeup and specialty armor on Star Trek: Discovery
- Spouse: Michele Hetrick (m. 2017)
- Website: www.alchemyfxstudio.com

Glenn Hetrick (born July 8, 1972) is an American prosthetic makeup artist, designer, actor and producer. Hetrick is CEO of Alchemy FX Studios, a special effects studio which has worked on over 100 film and TV credits, such as Star Trek: Discovery, Hunger Games, Marvel's Agents of S.H.I.E.L.D., and Mad Men. He has been nominated for numerous awards for his work.

== Early life ==
Glenn Hetrick was born July 8, 1972 in Bethlehem, Pennsylvania. He attended Saucon Valley High School in Hellertown, Pennsylvania, where he developed his love for acting when he was chosen to play the villain Bill Sikes in the musical "Oliver".

He earned a bachelor's degree in public relations and promotions from York College of Pennsylvania, where he was a member of the Tau Kappa Epsilon fraternity.

== Career ==
Hetrick’s professional career began when he wrote, produced, and designed the makeups for the music video, Scream! for the horror/heavy metal rock band, The Misfits, with director George A. Romero directing. In 2000, Hetrick moved to Los Angeles to expand his professional goals where he landed a job at Optic Nerve Studios, working on such shows as Buffy the Vampire Slayer, The X-Files, and Crossing Jordan. He later appeared in acting roles on Charmed, Scrubs, and Heroes. Hetrick now owns Alchemy Studios which is known for such media as The Hunger Games, Mad Men, and CSI: New York.

Beginning in 2012, Hetrick served as the lead judge on all thirteen seasons of the Syfy original series Face Off, which features makeup artists competing for $100,000. Hetrick has been nominated for three Primetime Emmy Awards. In 2019, Hetrick won the Primetime Emmy Award for Outstanding Prosthetic Makeup for a Series, Limited Series, Movie or Special for his work on Star Trek: Discovery.

In 2021, it was announced Hetrick was producing and adapting the 1980s horror cult novel series Necroscope with production company Revelations Entertainment founded by Morgan Freeman.

In 2024, Titan Publishing Group released a book titled Star Trek: The Art of Glenn Hetrick's Alchemy Studios, an in-depth illustrated book about Hetrick and his studio featuring art and behind-the-scenes photography, and interviews with Hetrick regarding their work Seasons 1-5 of Star Trek: Discovery.

== Personal life ==
In 2017, Hetrick married his wife, fellow producer and makeup artist Michele Hetrick at the historic The Mission Inn Hotel & Spa.
