= List of Star Trek: Discovery characters =

Star Trek: Discovery is an American television series created for Paramount+ (originally known as CBS All Access) by Bryan Fuller and Alex Kurtzman. Set roughly a decade before the events of the original Star Trek series and separate from the timeline of the concurrent feature films, Discovery explores the Federation–Klingon war while following the crew of the USS Discovery. It premiered on September 24, 2017.

The series stars Sonequa Martin-Green as Michael Burnham, a Starfleet mutineer who is given a war-time field assignment as a science specialist on the USS Discovery and the adopted sister of original series character Spock. Doug Jones, Shazad Latif, Anthony Rapp, and Mary Wiseman round out the main cast. They were joined by Jason Isaacs for the first season and Anson Mount for the second. Characters seen previously in Star Trek also appear in recurring roles, including Spock's father Sarek, portrayed by James Frain, and Harry Mudd, portrayed by Rainn Wilson.

The following list includes Star Trek: Discovery's main cast, as well as all guest stars deemed to have had recurring roles throughout the series, and a supplementary list of other noteworthy guests.

== Overview ==
= Main cast (credited)
= Recurring cast (3+)
= Guest cast (1-2)

Actor	Character	Seasons				
Actor	Character	1	2	3	4	5
Main cast
Sonequa Martin-Green	Michael Burnham	Main	Main	Main	Main	Main
Doug Jones	Saru	Main	Main	Main	Main	Main (Note: credited in the main titles only in episodes in which they appear.)
Shazad Latif	Voq	Recurring (Note: Latif is credited as Javid Iqbal in his first three appearances as Voq.)				
Shazad Latif	Ash Tyler	Main	Main			
Anthony Rapp	Paul Stamets	Main	Main	Main	Main	Main
Mary Wiseman	Sylvia Tilly	Main	Main	Main	Main	Main
Jason Isaacs	Gabriel Lorca	Main				
Wilson Cruz	Hugh Culber	Recurring	Main	Main	Main	Main
Anson Mount	Christopher Pike		Main			
Rachael Ancheril	Nhan		Recurring	Main	Guest	Guest
David Ajala	Cleveland "Book" Booker			Main	Main	Main
Tig Notaro	Jett Reno		Recurring	Recurring	Main	Main
Blu del Barrio	Adira Tal			Recurring	Main	Main
Callum Keith Rennie	Rayner					Main
Recurring cast
Michelle Yeoh	Philippa Georgiou	Recurring (Note: Yeoh is credited as a special guest star in the main titles only in episodes in which she appears.)	Recurring	Recurring		
Emily Coutts	Keyla Detmer	Recurring	Recurring	Recurring	Recurring	Recurring
Oyin Oladejo	Joann Owosekun	Recurring	Recurring	Recurring	Recurring	Recurring
Patrick Kwok-Choon	Gen Rhys	Recurring	Recurring	Recurring	Recurring	Recurring
Ronnie Rowe Jr.	R.A. Bryce	Recurring	Recurring	Recurring	Recurring	Guest
Mary Chieffo	L'Rell	Recurring	Recurring			
James Frain	Sarek	Recurring	Recurring			
Jayne Brook	Katrina Cornwell	Recurring	Recurring			
Kenneth Mitchell	Kol	Recurring				
Kenneth Mitchell	Kol-sha		Guest			
Kenneth Mitchell	Tenavik		Guest			
Kenneth Mitchell	Aurellio			Guest		
Rainn Wilson	Harry Mudd	Guest				
Rekha Sharma	Ellen Landry	Recurring		Guest		
Sara Mitich	Airiam	Recurring				
Hannah Cheesman	Airiam		Recurring	Guest		Guest
Sara Mitich	Nilsson		Recurring	Recurring	Recurring	
Mia Kirshner	Amanda Grayson	Guest	Recurring			
Ethan Peck	Spock		Recurring	Archive		
Raven Dauda	Tracy Pollard	Guest	Recurring	Recurring	Recurring	Guest
David Benjamin Tomlinson	Linus		Recurring	Recurring	Recurring	Recurring
Rebecca Romijn	Number One		Recurring			
Alan van Sprang	Leland		Recurring			
Sonja Sohn	Gabrielle Burnham		Recurring	Guest	Guest	
Oded Fehr	Charles Vance			Recurring	Recurring	Recurring
Ian Alexander	Gray Tal			Recurring	Recurring	Guest
David Cronenberg	Kovich			Recurring	Recurring	Recurring
Annabelle Wallis (voice)	Zora			Recurring	Recurring	Recurring
Durban and Leeu	Grudge			Recurring	Recurring	Recurring
Vanessa Jackson	Audrey Willa			Recurring	Guest	
Noah Averbach-Katz	Ryn			Recurring		
Janet Kidder	Osyraa			Recurring		
Tara Rosling	T'Rina			Guest	Recurring	Recurring
Chelah Horsdal	Laira Rillak				Recurring	Guest
Orville Cummings	Christopher				Recurring	Recurring
Shawn Doyle	Ruon Tarka				Recurring	
Elias Toufexis	Cold	Guest				
Elias Toufexis	L'ak					Recurring
Eve Harlow	Moll					Recurring
Victoria Sawal	Naya					Recurring
Natalie Liconti	Gallo					Recurring
Christina Dixon	Asha					Recurring
Tony Nappo	Ruhn					Recurring
Dorian Grey	Arisar					Recurring

== Main characters ==
=== Michael Burnham ===
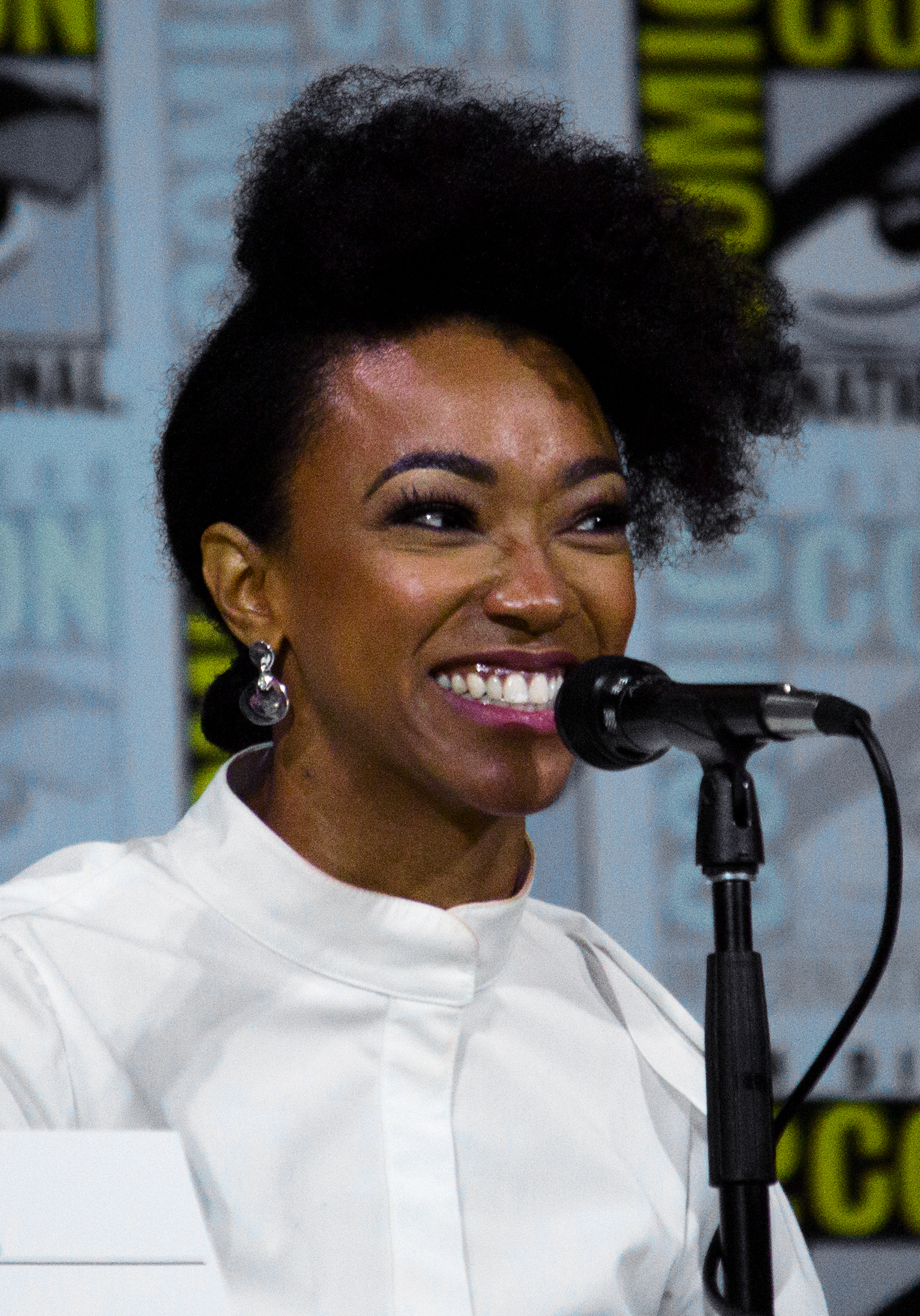
Sonequa Martin-Green

Michael Burnham (portrayed by Sonequa Martin-Green) is a science specialist aboard the USS Discovery. Burnham was first officer of the USS Shenzhou, where she was referred to as "number one", until she was convicted of mutiny and sentenced to life in prison. Discovery captain Gabriel Lorca, brings Burnham back to duty with a temporary wartime assignment as a scientist on his ship. Burnham was raised following Vulcan culture and traditions by Sarek, and is the first human to attend the Vulcan Learning Center and Vulcan Science Academy.

Series co-creator Bryan Fuller had anticipated casting announcements for the show in October 2016, but no announcements had been made by the end of that month. The majority of the series main characters were believed to have been cast by then, but no actress had been cast for the series' lead role. This was a source of "some internal stress" at CBS, with the casting of the character deemed "a far tougher assignment" than expected. Several African American and Latina actresses were being looked at for the role, with CBS "not seeking a huge star and [preferring] a fresh face for the part." Martin-Green was cast in the role in December, which was revealed with the character's production codename "lieutenant commander Rainsford". Her casting was officially confirmed in April 2017, following the end of her run on The Walking Dead, with the character's actual name also revealed. The character has an inner conflict due to being raised by Sarek, with showrunner Aaron Harberts explaining that many of the actresses tested for the role "either went way too robotic and chilly or way too emotional", but Martin-Green was "able to be aloof but warm; logical but able to surrender her emotional side to the audience."

Since Sarek's son Spock never mentioned a sister in the original series, executive producer Alex Kurtzman said that the specifics of Burnham's backstory would be revealed in a way that would not break the existing canon continuity. As the show's protagonist, Burnham was not made a starship captain, like those of previous Star Trek series, "to see a character from a different perspective on the starship—one who has different dynamic relationships with a captain, with subordinates; it gave us richer context", though she does become captain of Discovery at the end of the last episode of season three. In the first two episodes of the series (stripped of rank by the end of episode two), she is referred to as Number One to honor the character of the same name portrayed by Majel Barrett in the original 1965 Star Trek pilot "The Cage", and was initially pitched to CBS as only being called Number One in the series. Fuller deliberately gave the character a traditionally male name as he did with the female leads of three previous (non-Star Trek) productions. Martin-Green decided that the character was named after her biological father.

=== Saru ===
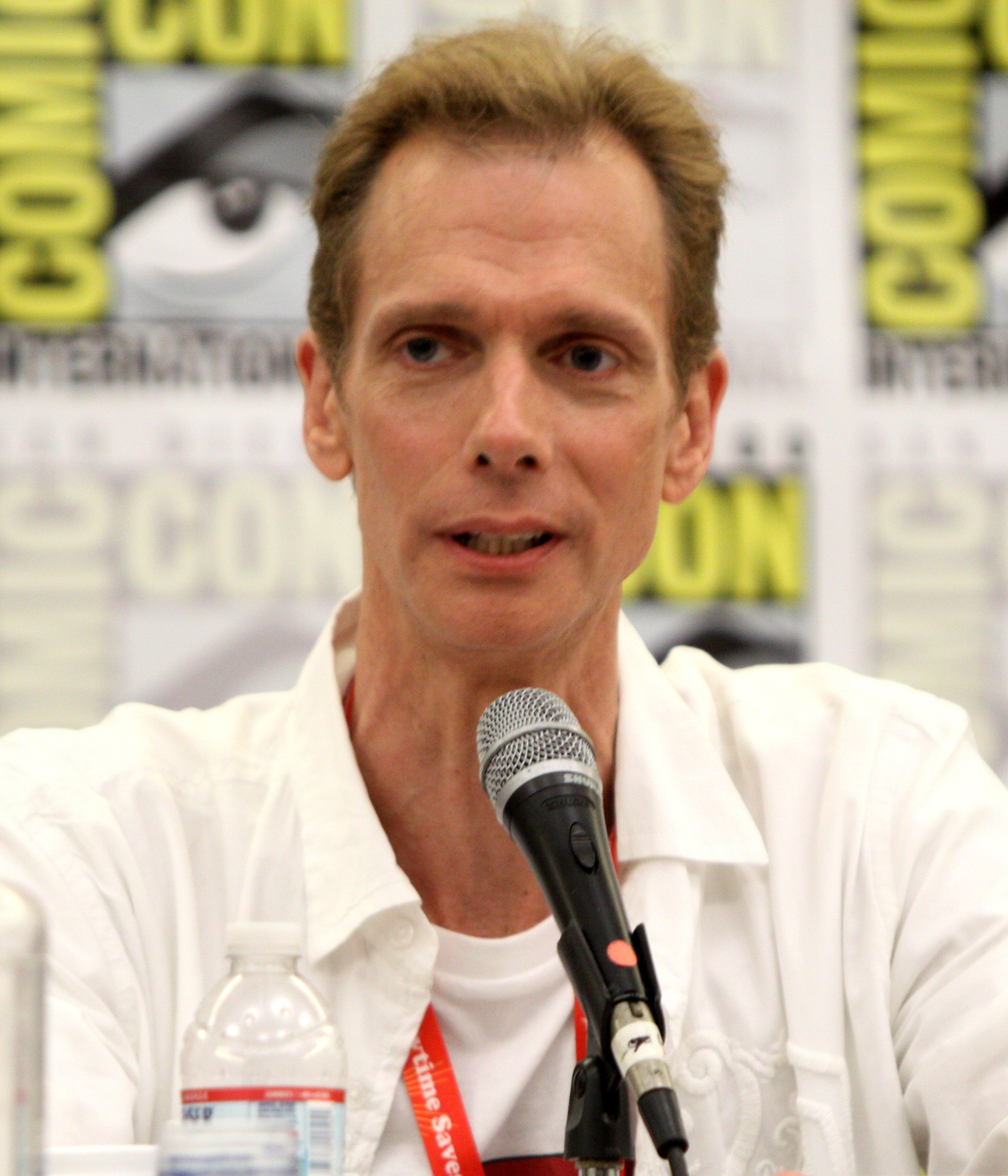
Doug Jones

Saru (portrayed by Doug Jones) is a captain serving as first officer of the USS Discovery, and the first Kelpien to enter Starfleet. Saru was introduced in the series premiere as a lieutenant commander serving as chief science officer on the USS Shenzhou, which is rendered a hulk during a battle in the series' second episode. Before the events of "Context Is for Kings", Saru becomes first officer on the USS Discovery.

In the Star Trek: Short Treks episode "The Brightest Star", it is revealed that Saru adapted a communication device left behind by the pre-warp Kelpien's oppressors (the Ba'ul), eventually connecting with a young Starfleet officer—Lt. Philippa Georgiou—who obtained permission to "rescue" him from his planet.

Jones was cast as Saru in November 2016. Kelpiens, a new species created for Discovery, were hunted as prey on their home planet and thus evolved the ability to sense the coming of death. This skill has given them a reputation for cowardice in the Federation. Jones was excited to, "from the ground up, develop and find this character and his species" and not have to honor a previous fan-favorite representation. He based Saru's walk on that of a supermodel, out of necessity thanks to the boots he had to wear to portray the character's hooved feet forcing Jones to walk on the balls of his feet. The producers compared Saru to the characters Spock and Data from previous series in the franchise.

In the Mirror Universe, Saru is a nameless slave stationed on the ISS Shenzhou.

=== Ash Tyler and Voq ===
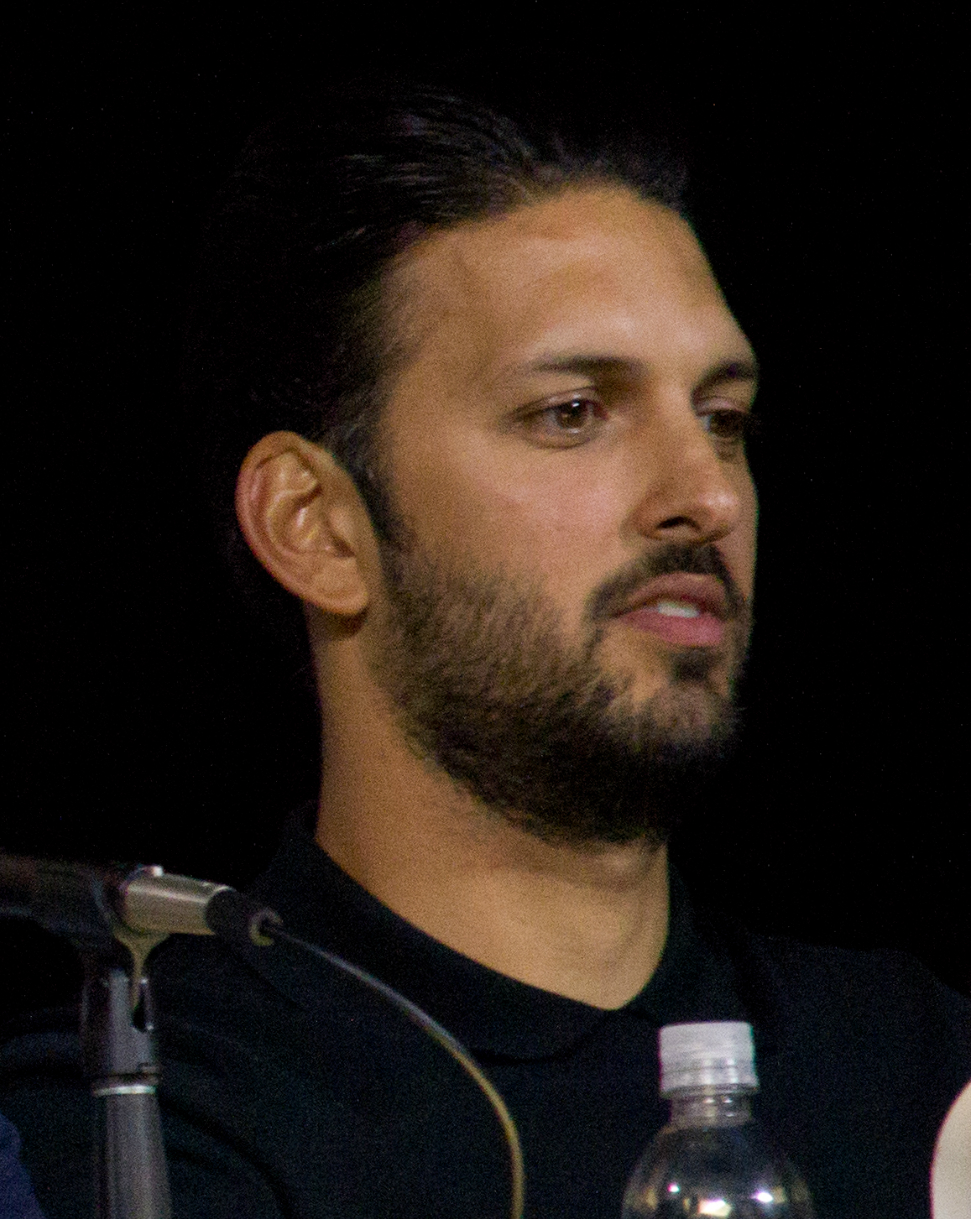
Shazad Latif (2017)

Voq (portrayed by Shazad Latif) is an albino Klingon, described as being "touched by fate and fire". He undergoes surgery and personality alterations to disguise himself as Ash Tyler, a human Starfleet lieutenant and former prisoner of war.

Latif was originally cast in the role of the Klingon Kol in December 2016, before being recast as Tyler at the end of April 2017. Voq was initially credited as being portrayed by Javid Iqbal, an invented actor named for Latif's father, to hide the connection between the characters. Latif described his character as "a very complex and painful and deep character", and noted that "there's a chemistry, a relationship" with Burnham. Latif's accent for Voq is Arabic-inspired, and he tried to maintain "a kind of pharyngealness" to Tyler's American accent.

=== Paul Stamets ===
Paul Stamets (portrayed by Anthony Rapp) is a science officer specializing in astromycology (the study of fungi in space). He is married to Hugh Culber. Rapp was revealed to have been cast as Stamets in November 2016. He was originally cast in a different, smaller role, but when discussing gay actors who could portray the character Stamets, the executive producers realized that Rapp was the actor they wanted to fill that role instead. He did not audition for either role.

Stamets and Culber are jointly the first openly gay characters in a Star Trek series, and the showrunners "wanted to roll out that character's sexuality the way people would roll out their sexuality in life". Rapp noted that Hikaru Sulu was portrayed as gay in the film Star Trek Beyond, calling that "a nice nod. But in this case, we actually get to see me with my partner in conversation, in our living quarters, you get to see our relationship over time, treated as any other relationship would be treated". Stamets is inspired by a real-life mycologist of the same name, whom Fuller had introduced to the series' writers early on after becoming interested in his research into spores. The character's outlook that physics and biology are quantifiably the same thing also comes from the real Stamets's research and theories.

=== Sylvia Tilly ===
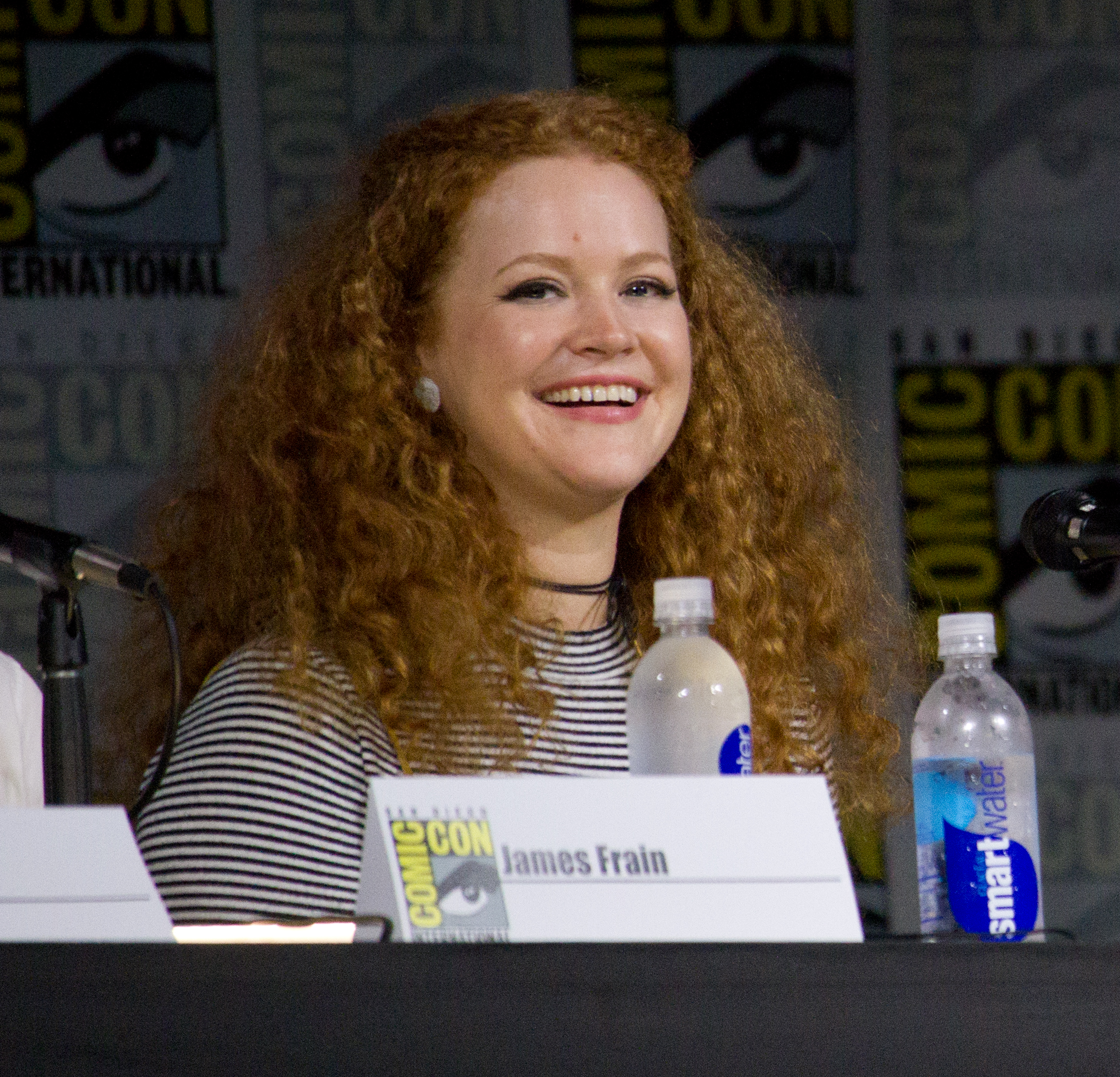
Mary Wiseman

Sylvia Tilly (portrayed by Mary Wiseman) is a cadet in her final year at Starfleet Academy in season 1 and is assigned to the Discovery. She is assigned to engineering and works under Stamets aboard the Discovery, and becomes roommates there with Burnham. In season 3 Captain Saru made Sylvia Tilly the first officer on board Discovery. Due to Saru being off of the ship for a long amount of time she took over as captain, but in the final episode she relinquishes the role of acting captain due to Commander Burnham's promotion to captain. During season 4 Tilly served as a lieutenant onboard the USS Discovery under Captain Burnham before leaving to join Starfleet Academy as a tutor.

Wiseman was cast in March 2017. Tilly was included to represent people "at the very bottom of this ladder" of the Starfleet hierarchy. She is "the most optimistic … has the biggest heart", and Harberts described her as "sort of the soul of our show". The character was named after showrunner Gretchen J. Berg's two-year-old niece. On February 7, 2018, Wiseman said that Tilly was not written and portrayed as on the autism spectrum, but is personally touched by the fans interpretation and has been praised by autistic trans commentator Jessie Earl for not falling into the tropes of socially isolating from other characters.

=== Gabriel Lorca ===
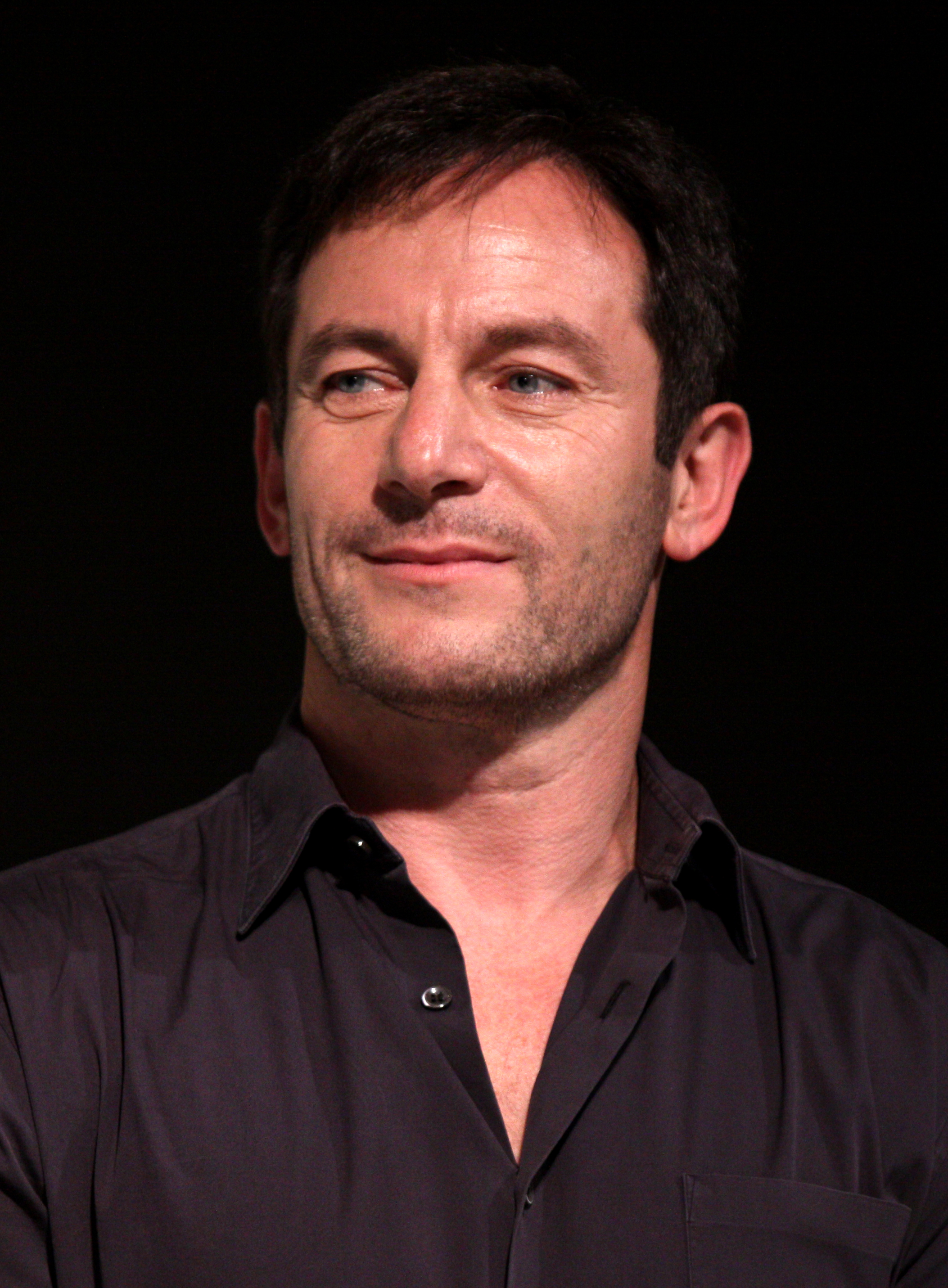
Jason Isaacs

Gabriel Lorca (portrayed by Jason Isaacs) is captain of the Discovery in the first season, a "brilliant military tactician". Isaacs joined the series in March 2017, describing Lorca as "probably more f-d up than any of" the previously seen Star Trek captains, and comparing the character to his portrayal of Mike Steele in the film Black Hawk Down. Isaacs was initially given the first two scripts for the series, which Lorca does not appear in, and an early draft of his introduction in the third that was going to be re-written, but agreed to join the series after discussing the series and character with the executive producers. He plays the character with a slight southern U.S. accent, wanting to avoid using his own English accent and thus being "a very pale shadow of the brilliant Patrick Stewart". Of the character, Isaacs said: "he's a military man, but he can be immensely charming. I've been privileged enough to work with the [U.S. Army] Rangers at Fort Benning, and no matter where you come from in America, if you train down South where most of the bases are, you pick up some form of a Southern accent. And I wanted something that had subliminal hints at the military." Isaacs initially wanted to ad-lib a catchphrase for the character feeling that all Star Trek captains should have one, coming up with "git'r done" which the writers turned down due to it being widely used and trademarked by Larry the Cable Guy. Comparing his character to Captain Georgiou, Isaacs said, "Georgiou is a mother figure, and I am unsentimental and don't see my job as protecting [Burnham] emotionally or any other way. I see her as a very, very useful asset in this war." In addition to having a standard captain's ready-room, Lorca also has a room referred to as his "menagerie" where he keeps things that he collects. This includes the skeleton of a Gorn, a species that is apparently first discovered later in the original series, with Harberts feeling that the presence of this skeleton added to the mystery of the character—how did he come about it, and how does the rest of Starfleet not know of the species if he does?

=== Hugh Culber ===
Hugh Culber (portrayed by Wilson Cruz) is a medical officer of the Discovery. Culber is married to Paul Stamets. They are jointly the first openly gay characters in a Star Trek series. Ash Tyler kills Culber in episode 10 of the first season. Culber later returns to life in season 2 after it is discovered that he was duplicated and trapped within the mycelial network before being rescued. On creating the first gay couple in a Star Trek series, Cruz said he "felt like it was a long time coming.... What's great about the way that the show is handling it is it's not like we are having a special two-hour episode about gay relationships in space. It's not that. They just happen to be in love, and they happen to be coworkers. And, I hope by the time we get to [the 23rd] century that it will be exactly like that." In 2019, Hugh Culber was ranked the 10th-sexiest Star Trek character by Syfy.

=== Christopher Pike ===
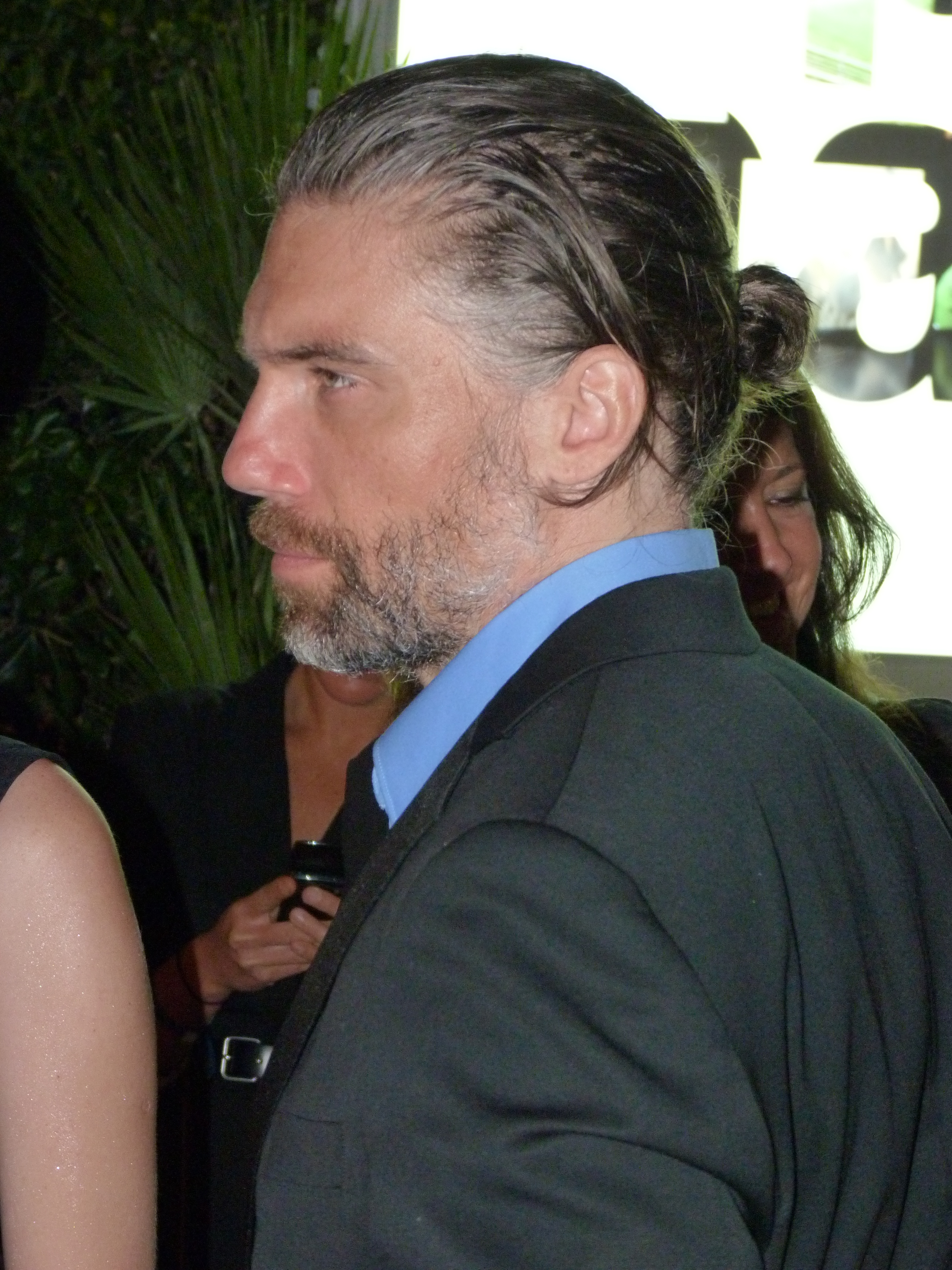
Anson Mount

Christopher Pike (portrayed by Anson Mount) is captain of the USS Enterprise. After the first season concluded with the Discovery receiving a distress call from the Enterprise, specifically from Pike, Harberts expressed interest in exploring that character in the second season, feeling that he had not been seen much in Star Trek previously and so "there's an interesting opportunity that we might have to delve into and flesh out a character who I think is a pretty darn heroic and selfless captain." In April 2018, Mount was cast as Pike, which was described as a "key role" for the season. He revealed in July 2018 that he was contracted as a main cast member for the full season.

Jeffrey Hunter portrays Captain Pike in footage from the original 1965 Star Trek pilot "The Cage", used in a recap that plays at the start of the Star Trek: Discovery season two episode "If Memory Serves".

=== Cleveland "Book" Booker ===
Cleveland "Book" Booker (portrayed by David Ajala) is a character introduced in the third season of Star Trek: Discovery. A resident of the new future created after Control's defeat, he becomes Michael's companion when she goes to the future before the Discovery itself, and her new love interest. He is also shown to own a cat named Grudge.

=== Nhan ===
Commander Nhan (portrayed by Rachael Ancheril) is an engineer and security officer. She initially serves on board the Enterprise but later transfers to the Discovery along with two of her crewmates. Nhan is later appointed chief of security aboard the Discovery. After arriving in the 32nd century, she begins working for Starfleet Security and leaves Discovery, although she occasionally returns to help her old friends in her new role.

=== Jett Reno ===
Jett Reno (portrayed by Tig Notaro) is the chief engineer of the USS Hiawatha. Notaro joined the series because of an existing relationship with Kurtzman, who had the part written for the actress. The character was originally named Denise Reno but Notaro was able to rename the character and changed it to Jett Reno. Reno possesses a sardonic, deadpan sense of humor, and is often at odds with Stamets. She frequently uses references to 20th-century engineering technology, such as fixing things with duct tape, using a battery-operated power drill, etc. It's revealed in the fifth season that she was once a smuggler and worked various odd jobs before joining Starfleet.

On Discovery, Reno is revealed to be a widow whose wife was killed by Klingons during their war with the Federation. In Star Trek: Starfleet Academy, Reno has transferred to the Athena to pursue a romantic relationship with the Klingon-Jem'Hadar hybrid Lura Thok and she is now a Starfleet Academy instructor.

=== Adira Tal ===
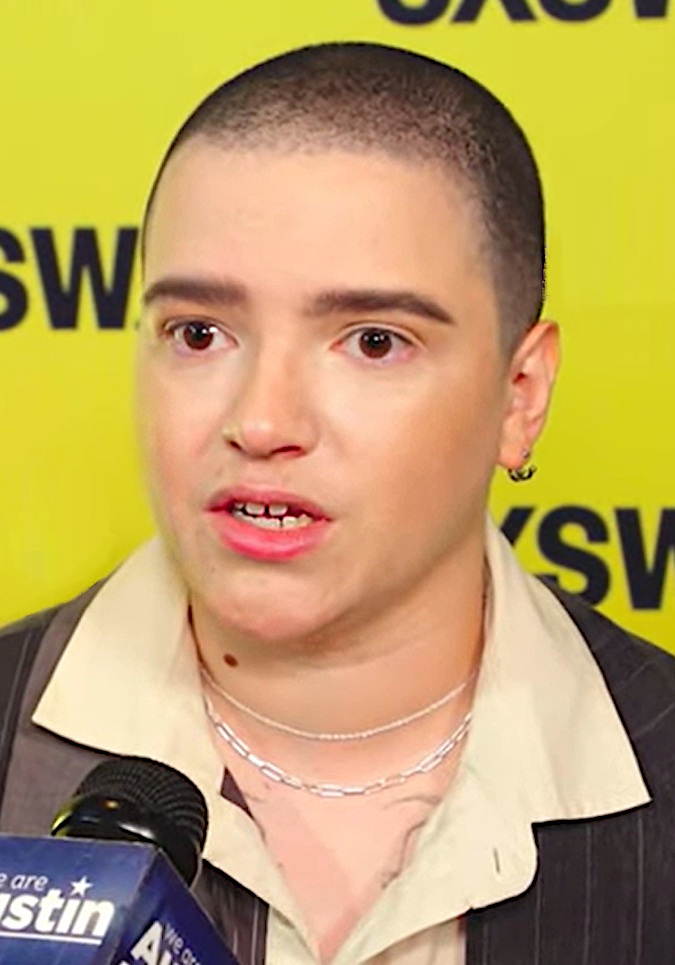
Blu del Barrio

Adira Tal (portrayed by Blu del Barrio) is an ensign aboard the USS Discovery. Adira is Star Trek’s first non‑binary character and the first human to remain bonded with a Trill symbiont for an extended period. Upon introduction, Adira serves in the United Earth Defense Force but later remains on the USS Discovery, where memory recovery becomes possible. Stamets and Culber eventually take Adira under their wing. During season three, Adira is the only individual able to see Gray Tal, Adira’s boyfriend and the former host of the Tal symbiont. In season four, Adira receives a promotion to ensign on the Discovery and contributes to calculations related to the DMA crisis. Adira uses they/them pronouns.

=== Gray Tal ===
Gray Tal (portrayed by Ian Alexander) is a Trill character introduced in season three of Star Trek Discovery. Gray is the former host of the Tal symbiont, which was given to Adira upon his death. During the third season, he appears only to Adira as a separate entity not visible to others. He is later incorporated into a new android body during the fourth season using the same process that had resurrected Jean-Luc Picard, in which he returns to Trill to begin training to be a Trill guardian. Gray eventually breaks up with Adira due to their separate paths and they stay friends.

== Recurring characters ==
=== Introduced in a previous series ===
==== Sarek ====
Sarek (portrayed by James Frain) is a Vulcan ambassador and astrophysicist, the father of Spock, and the adoptive father of Michael Burnham. Frain appears as a younger version of the character who was first portrayed by Mark Lenard in the original Star Trek series episode "Journey to Babel".

==== Spock ====
Spock (portrayed by Ethan Peck) is Sarek's son, and therefore Burnham's foster brother. An officer on the Enterprise serving under Pike, he plays a prominent recurring role in the second season.

Leonard Nimoy portrays Spock in footage from the original 1965 Star Trek pilot "The Cage", used in a recap that plays at the start of the Star Trek: Discovery season two episode "If Memory Serves". A holorecording of Nimoy's Spock, from the Next Generation episode "Unification, Part 2" also appears in the third season episode, "Unification III".

=== Introduced in season one ===
==== Philippa Georgiou ====
Philippa Georgiou (portrayed by Michelle Yeoh) is the captain of the USS Shenzhou (NCC-1227). Georgiou has a "mother and daughter" relationship with Burnham after the latter joins the Shenzhou. Yeoh chose to retain her Malaysian Chinese accent for the role, another way the series diversified its cast.

Georgiou is killed in hand-to-hand combat by the Klingon warrior T'Kuvma in the aftermath of the Battle at the Binary Stars. Later in season one, the Mirror Universe Georgiou is introduced. Her official title is, "Mother of the Fatherland, Overlord of Vulcan, Dominus of Qo'nos, Regina Andor, Philippa Georgiou Augustus Iaponius Centaurius". In this universe, she is the ruthless emperor of the Terran Empire and adoptive mother of that universe's Michael Burnham. She is brought over to the show's prime universe by its Burnham, and later joins Section 31. After being transported into the future, she begins experiencing deterioration and agrees to allow the Guardian of Forever to send her back to a time that she can survive in.

It was pointed out that Philippa has a bottle of Chateau Picard wine.

==== Keyla Detmer ====
Lieutenant Keyla Detmer (portrayed by Emily Coutts) is Discovery's helmsman, previously serving on the Shenzhou.

Six months after the destruction of the Shenzhou, Detmer was promoted to full lieutenant and was assigned to serve as helm officer under Captain Gabriel Lorca on the Discovery. She is depicted as having cybernetic implants on the left side of her face, including her left eye, to compensate for injuries received during the Battle of the Binary Stars.

==== L'Rell ====
L'Rell (portrayed by Mary Chieffo) becomes the chancellor of the Klingon Empire after being a battle deck commander for a Klingon warship. L'Rell is a member of both the house of T'Kuvma and the house of Mo'Kai, the latter having been first mentioned during Star Trek: Voyager. Chieffo said that because of this, there would be an "interesting exploration of what it is to be of two different ideologies" with the character. Chieffo looked back at past female Klingons seen in Star Trek for inspiration, and said that she wanted L'Rell to follow in the vein of Grilka from Star Trek: Deep Space Nine.

==== Kol ====
Kol (introduced and later dies in season one, portrayed by Kenneth Mitchell) is the commanding officer of the Klingon military, and an opponent of T'Kuvma's goals. Kol is a member of the house of Kor, a character portrayed by John Colicos in the original series and Star Trek: Deep Space Nine. Mitchell described Kol as both "complicated" and "powerful", and said that he studied Colicos's "subtle" performance and read the novel The Final Reflection to prepare. In the Star Trek science fiction universe, Klingons live long enough that characters like Kor, who were alive at the time of Kirk (the 2260s) can still be alive at the time of Picard, Sisko, and Janeway in the 2360–70s. (Kenneth Mitchell also portrayed Kol-Sha, the father of Kol, in the season 2 episode "Point of Light".)

==== Katrina Cornwell ====
Katrina Cornwell (portrayed by Jayne Brook) is a Starfleet admiral. She appears several times as Captain Lorca's direct superior and later confidant. She and Lorca had a previous romantic relationship. She was captured by the Klingons while replacing Sarek as a peace envoy and held on the Klingon Ship of the Dead. Surviving her ordeal she forms an odd non-friendship with L'Rell and is later rescued by Burnham and Tyler. Her background is in mental health and psychology, which was vital in breaking Tyler out of a PTSD flashback long enough to aid in the escape from the Sarcophagus ship. After her rescue she returns to Starfleet, where she later sacrifices her life to save the Enterprise in the battle against Control-Leland.

==== Additional characters introduced in season one ====
Additionally, appearing throughout the first season are Ali Momen as Kamran Gant, Chris Violette as Britch Weeton, Romaine Waite as Troy Januzzi, Sara Mitich (in season one) and Hannah Cheesman (in season two) as Airiam, Mitich takes the role of Lieutenant Nilsson – Airiam's replacement on the Discovery bridge – in season two; Oyin Oladejo as Joann Owosekun, Ronnie Rowe as R. A. Bryce, Conrad Coates as Terral, and Patrick Kwok-Choon as Gen Rhys. The Osnullus (either the character's name or species) can be seen in several episodes as bridge crew, science officers or other background characters. Actress Avaah Blackwell portrays the bridge officer version of the character, an ensign (identified as a female in her social media channels). Tasia Valenza and Julianne Grossman voice the computers of the Shenzhou and the Discovery, respectively.

=== Introduced in season two ===
==== Nilsson ====
Lt. Nilsson (portrayed by Sara Mitich) is an operations officer on the bridge of the Discovery. Mitich portrayed Airiam in season one of the show, before that role was taken over by Hannah Cheesman for season two, while Mitich began recurring as Nilsson in season two – who eventually takes the bridge position of the deceased ("Project Daedalus") Airiam.

== Guest characters ==
=== Introduced in a previous series ===
- Amanda Grayson (portrayed by Mia Kirshner): The human wife of Sarek. Kirshner appears as a younger version of the character who was first portrayed by Jane Wyatt in the original Star Trek television series episode "Journey to Babel".
- Harcourt Fenton "Harry" Mudd (portrayed by Rainn Wilson) is a charismatic con-man. In March 2017, Wilson was cast as a younger version of the character first played by Roger C. Carmel in the original Star Trek series episode "Mudd's Women". He described his version as "a reimagining, a reinvention in the same way so many things have been reimagined and reinvented. He's a bit more dastardly than the original. But that character made such an impression on me, and it is a dream come true to try to bring him to life with as much drama and comedy as possible." Wilson "stole a lot of things that I loved from [Carmel's] performance, and then added a lot more of my own."
- Stella Mudd (portrayed by Katherine Barrell): Harry Mudd's wife. An android replica of the character was previously portrayed by Kay Elliot in the original Star Trek series episode "I, Mudd".
- Number One (portrayed by Rebecca Romijn): First Officer to Pike on the Enterprise, first portrayed by Majel Barrett in the original 1965 Star Trek pilot "The Cage". "The Cage" studio pilot was not released to the public until a 1986 VHS release. However, segments of "The Cage" were used for the 1966 episode "The Menagerie" and broadcast on television at that time as part of season 1, including scenes with Majel Barrett as Pike's 'Number One'.
  - Barrett portrays 'Number One' in footage from "The Cage" used in a recap that plays at the start of the Star Trek: Discovery season two episode "If Memory Serves".
- Vina (portrayed by Melissa George): Sole survivor of Earth science expedition that crashed on planet Talos IV, first portrayed by Susan Oliver in the original Star Trek pilot "The Cage".
  - Oliver portrays Vina in footage from "The Cage" used in a recap that plays at the start of the Star Trek: Discovery season two episode "If Memory Serves".
- Yeoman Colt (portrayed by Nicole Dickinson): A member of the Enterprise bridge crew, first portrayed by Laurel Goodwin in "The Cage". Colt was a human woman in the original series, but appears in Discovery as a seemingly alien character with spiky red skin.
- Carl (portrayed by Paul Guilfoyle): The avatar of the Guardian of Forever from the original series episode "The City on the Edge of Forever." In the two part episode "Terra Firma" of season 3, the crew of the Discovery seeks out a cure for Philippa Georgiou's illness coming from her displacement in time and from the mirror universe. As Carl, the Guardian of Forever tests Georgiou before sending her back in time to a place where the prime and mirror universes are still aligned and she can thus survive.

=== Introduced in season one ===
- T'Kuvma (portrayed by Chris Obi): The leader of an ancient Klingon house who wants to unite all of the Klingon houses.
- Ellen Landry (portrayed by Rekha Sharma): Security officer for the Discovery.
- Clint Howard portrays an Orion drug dealer who Tilly encounters on Qo'noS. The role was written specifically for Howard, adding to his previous appearances in the franchise, with guest roles on episodes of Star Trek: The Original Series (in 1966), Star Trek: Deep Space Nine (in 1995), and Star Trek: Enterprise (in 2002).

=== Introduced in season two ===
- Leland (portrayed by Alan van Sprang): A Section 31 agent. Van Sprang was cast for the original ending of the first season, but the scene was cut and later released separately online along with confirmation that he would continue to play the part in the second season.
