= Star Trek: Discovery season 4 =

Star Trek: Discovery
- Season 4
- Promotional poster
- Showrunners: Alex Kurtzman; Michelle Paradise
- Starring: Sonequa Martin-Green; Doug Jones; Anthony Rapp; Mary Wiseman; Wilson Cruz; Blu del Barrio; David Ajala; Tig Notaro
- No. of episodes: 13

Release
- Original network: Paramount+
- Original release: November 18, 2021 – March 17, 2022

Season chronology
- ← Previous; Season 3 Next → Season 5

The fourth season of the American television series Star Trek: Discovery follows the crew of the starship Discovery in the 32nd century, more than 900 years after Star Trek: The Original Series, as they help rebuild the United Federation of Planets following a cataclysmic event and face a space anomaly that causes destruction across the galaxy. The season was produced by CBS Studios in association with Secret Hideout and Roddenberry Entertainment, with Alex Kurtzman and Michelle Paradise serving as showrunners.

Sonequa Martin-Green stars as Michael Burnham, captain of the Discovery, along with the returning Doug Jones, Anthony Rapp, Mary Wiseman, Wilson Cruz, Blu del Barrio, David Ajala, and Tig Notaro. Active development on the season began by January 2020. More time was spent writing than previous seasons due to the COVID-19 pandemic, which inspired the space anomaly that the characters face in the season. Burnham's new role as captain is also explored following her promotion at the end of the third season. The fourth season was officially announced in October 2020, and filming took place in Toronto, Canada, from November 2020 to August 2021. New filming processes were implemented to ensure safety during the pandemic, which caused some production delays. A video wall was constructed to allow for filming in front of real-time computer-generated backgrounds.

The season premiered on the streaming service Paramount+ on November 18, 2021, and the first seven episodes were released through December 30. The remaining six episodes were released from February 10 to March 17, 2022. The season's international release on Netflix was cancelled days before the premiere to allow a 2022 debut on Paramount+ for most countries; after fan backlash, the series was made available early in some countries through Pluto TV or digital purchase. The season was estimated to have high viewership and audience demand, and received positive reviews as well as several awards and nominations. A fifth season was ordered in January 2022.

== Episodes ==
No. overall	No. in season	Title	Directed by	Written by	Original release date
43	1	"Kobayashi Maru"	Olatunde Osunsanmi	Michelle Paradise & Jenny Lumet & Alex Kurtzman	November 18, 2021
Captain Michael Burnham of the USS Discovery and her partner, Cleveland "Book" Booker, invite the people of Alshain IV to rejoin the United Federation of Planets. They prove the Federation's intentions by helping to fix long-broken Alshain technology. Book then departs to his home planet, Kwejian, to participate in his nephew Leto's coming-of-age ceremony. Burnham and the crew of Discovery attend the official reopening of Starfleet Academy, where they meet new Federation president Laira Rillak. Starfleet receives a distress call from a space station near Kwejian, and Rillak accompanies Discovery to investigate. The space station has been sent spinning uncontrollably by an unknown gravitational distortion, and Burnham decides to help evacuate its personnel herself; Rillak questions Burnham's decisions, and later reveals that she was observing Burnham as a potential candidate for a new assignment but has concerns about her approach. On Kwejian, Book witnesses strange bird activity and flies off-world to investigate it, just as the gravitational distortion destroys the entire planet.
44	2	"Anomaly"	Olatunde Osunsanmi	Anne Cofell Saunders & Glenise Mullins	November 25, 2021
Book becomes numb from grief following the loss of his planet and family, and is haunted by hallucinations of Leto. Science officer Paul Stamets explains to Rillak and Starfleet Command that the destruction of Kwejian was caused by an unprecedented gravitational anomaly that requires further investigation. Former Discovery captain Saru returns to serve as Burnham's first officer, and they jump to a safe distance outside of the anomaly. Initial data disproves some of their theories, and Book volunteers to fly his ship into the anomaly to learn more. Burnham is convinced to let Book carry out the mission, and he is ultimately successful. During this time, the anomaly inexplicably changes direction and causes damage to the Discovery, leaving them unsure where it will go next and what impact this will have on other planets. Book later begins to open up to Burnham about his grief. Meanwhile, Dr. Hugh Culber and ensign Adira Tal help transfer the consciousness of Adira's deceased boyfriend Gray into a synthetic body, using an uncommon technology that was previously successful for Jean-Luc Picard. (Note: As depicted in the first season of Star Trek: Picard.)
45	3	"Choose to Live"	Christopher J. Byrne	Terri Hughes Burton	December 2, 2021
J'Vini, a Romulan citizen of Ni'Var and nun of the Qowat Milat order, attacks several Starfleet ships to steal rare dilithium crystals. In one robbery, she kills an officer. Starfleet Admiral Charles Vance reveals this to Burnham, Ni'Var President T'Rina, and Burnham's mother, Gabrielle, who is a member of the Qowat Milat. Rillak does not want to pursue J'Vini without T'Rina's guidance since Ni'Var is on the verge of negotiating its re-entry to the Federation. Gabrielle believes J'Vini has found a lost cause to fight for, and joins Burnham on a mission to arrest her. They find J'Vini on what appears to be a barren moon but is actually a massive starship holding refugees in suspended animation. Unable to wake them, J'Vini stole the dilithium so she can move the ship out of the path of the anomaly. Burnham arrests J'Vini, but helps wake the refugees and move their ship. Meanwhile, Stamets and Book travel to Ni'Var to parse the data on the anomaly, which Stamets has nicknamed the DMA (Dark Matter Anomaly). They do not learn what it is, but T'Rina helps Book relive memories of Leto which brings him some comfort.
46	4	"All Is Possible"	John Ottman	Alan McElroy & Eric J. Robbins	December 9, 2021
Ni'Var fast-tracks its negotiations with the Federation, and Rillak asks Burnham and Saru to participate. Culber suggests that Silvia Tilly, who has been feeling unsure about her place on the ship, accompany a group of new Starfleet Academy cadets on a team-building exercise. Adira also joins them for the mission, in which the cadets need to work together to survey a planet. They initially do not get along but are forced to bond after they are thrown off course and crash land on a dangerous moon. Together they are able to signal a Starfleet ship that saves them and returns them to Federation Headquarters, where the mysterious Dr. Kovich offers Tilly a teaching position at the Academy. Talks between Ni'Var and the Federation appear to break down, but Burnham and Saru talk to both sides and offer a compromise that they all agree to: a committee independent of Federation leadership will regularly review the union and provide independent oversight, and Burnham offers to serve on the committee as a citizen of both the Federation and Ni'Var. Tilly later accepts the teaching position and leaves the ship.
47	5	"The Examples"	Lee Rose	Kyle Jarrow	December 16, 2021
The DMA disappears and reappears 1000 light years away seconds later, proving that it is not a naturally-occurring anomaly. Scientist Ruon Tarka joins the ship to help determine who created the DMA, and is able to make a model of it which requires more power than Discovery can give. Learning that the Radvek asteroid belt is in the DMA's new path, Discovery is sent to evacuate its inhabitants. The magistrate of the belt is grateful for their help and begins organizing for his people to beam aboard, but he refuses to release their prisoners, who he refers to as "The Examples". Burnham and Book go to release the prisoners themselves, who claim to have been imprisoned unjustly. Burnham convinces them to escape by offering them asylum on Discovery, but one, Felix, chooses to stay behind. He reveals that he accidentally stole an orb recording a family's heritage and then murdered the owner in the ensuing fight. Book still wants to save him, but Burnham honors Felix's wishes and he dies when the asteroid belt is destroyed by the DMA. Burnham later gives the orb to the daughter of the man Felix killed.
48	6	"Stormy Weather"	Jonathan Frakes	Anne Cofell Saunders & Brandon Schultz	December 23, 2021
Discovery enters a subspace rift created by the DMA to investigate it, finding a void that they are unable to navigate out of. A DOT robot leaves the ship to investigate and disintegrates. Book and Stamets attempt to jump the ship out of the rift, but Book begins having hallucinations of his deceased father whose birthday it is. Stamets realizes that the hallucinations have been caused by interaction with particles from the barrier at the edge of the galaxy. The ship's advanced sentient computer, Zora, attempts to carry out her usual duties while helping to find a way out of the rift and unusually finds herself becoming overwhelmed with data. Gray offers to help Zora clear her processes by playing a game together. After doing this, Zora is able to detect micro-variances on the external sensors which can be used to lead them out of the void. To protect the crew from the effect that moving through the void will have, Burnham transports them all into the "pattern buffer" (where matter is converted into energy for transportation) and flies the ship with Zora. Burnham wakes up in sickbay to learn that they successfully exited the rift.
49	7	"...But to Connect"	Lee Rose	Terri Hughes Burton & Carlos Cisco	December 30, 2021
Zora determines the location of the DMA's creator, referred to as "Unknown Species 10-C", but refuses to share this with the crew out of concern for their safety. Dr. Kovich consults on Zora's behavior and notes that Starfleet has regulations against sentient systems being integrated with starships. Members of the crew advocate for Zora and her intentions, but others are concerned with her not following orders due to her control of all the ship's systems. Investigating her evolved programming, Kovich determines that Zora is a new lifeform and can remain on the ship, but to do so she is required to enlist in Starfleet and follow all orders from her superiors. She agrees and reveals the coordinates. Meanwhile, Burnham and Book attend an assembly of Federation and non-Federation representatives to discuss the DMA. Rillak and Burnham want to contact 10-C and try to avoid escalating the conflict, but Book supports Tarka who has designed a weapon to destroy the DMA before it harms anyone else; the assembly votes in favor of first contact. Tarka and Book escape, planning to use the weapon themselves.
50	8	"All In"	Christopher J. Byrne & Jen McGowan	Sean Cochran	February 10, 2022
Tarka needs isolynium to complete his weapon, and Burnham knows which black market dealer Book will try to get it from. Rillak refuses to let her go after him, and Vance publicly agrees but secretly gives Burnham different orders: gather data on 10-C's coordinates but at the same time try to get the isolynium before Book and Tarka do. The latter pair arrive at a casino on Porathia and meet with Haz Mazaro, who agrees to sell them the isolynium if Book helps find a cheater in the casino. Burnham and operations officer Joann Owosekun arrive soon after and buy charts from Mazaro that map 10-C's coordinates. They are unable to outbid Book and Tarka for the isolynium, so Owosekun fights in a ring to earn them more money. They approach Mazaro with the money just as Book captures a cheater, and the dealer decides to settle this draw with a card game. Book wins the game and claims the isolynium, but not before Burnham plants a tracker on it. The charts reveal a large, artificial "hyperfield" beyond the galactic barrier, and data suggests that it is powered by rare boronite that the DMA mines from planets.
51	9	"Rubicon"	Andi Armaganian	Alan McElroy	February 17, 2022
Former Discovery security officer Nhan is assigned to supervise the ship as it follows Burnham's tracking device, to ensure that Burnham does not allow her personal feelings to get in the way of stopping Book and Tarka. They jump to a position near Book's ship, where Book and Tarka complete the weapon. Saru leads a cloaked shuttle to sneak aboard Book's ship and disable the weapon, but it is attacked by a new automated security system that Tarka installed on Book's ship. Book helps Saru and the shuttle's crew escape back to Discovery, and then finds the tracker and disables it. He jumps into the DMA, and Discovery follows. Nhan prepares to order that Book's ship be destroyed before it can attack the controller at the center of the DMA. Both ships find the controller, and there is a stand-off in which Burnham is able to convince both Nhan and Book to stand down. Tarka goes behind Book's back and fires the weapon at the controller, destroying it and the DMA, but he does not find the power source that he expected to be there. Book and Tarka escape, and a new DMA appears in the same location soon after.
52	10	"The Galactic Barrier"	Deborah Kampmeier	Anne Cofell Saunders	February 24, 2022
Fearing retaliation from Species 10-C, Rillak moves up the timeline for first contact. She, T'Rina, and several diplomats board Discovery, which jumps to the galactic barrier and begins the dangerous flight through it. Before they lose contact with the Federation, they are contacted by Vance, who tells them that the DMA is now close to destroying Earth and Ni'Var. Meanwhile, Book and Tarka need programmable anti-matter to make it through the barrier themselves and travel to a stash of it that Tarka has in an abandoned prison where he was once held. Tarka explains that he had befriended a fellow prisoner, Oros, who built a machine to transport them to a peaceful parallel universe. They were separated and Tarka does not know if Oros was successful, but he hopes so and has built his own machine so that he can also travel there. It requires a large amount of power, and Tarka had planned to use the DMA's power source before realizing that it is at 10-C's location rather than in the DMA itself. After a difficult flight, Discovery emerges from the galactic barrier and begins traveling towards 10-C's coordinates.
53	11	"Rosetta"	Jeff Byrd & Jen McGowan	Terri Hughes Burton	March 3, 2022
Burnham decides to visit a dead planet near the hyperfield which may be the homeworld of Species 10-C. Earth General Diatta Ndoye believes this is a waste of time, but other diplomats support the decision if it provides useful information. Burnham travels to the planet with Saru, Culber, and pilot Keyla Detmer, where they find the large skeletons of a species that once lived in the planet's former gas layers. They also begin to experience hallucinations that create strong feelings such as fear. The team deduce that 10-C fled the planet during meteor strikes that burned away the gas and killed some members of the species, and that the species use complex hydrocarbon compounds to communicate their emotions which are now affecting them on the planet. They believe they can use these hydrocarbons to help communicate with 10-C. Meanwhile, Book and Tarka follow Discovery to the planet and sneak onboard. Tarka bypasses Zora's sensors to allow their ship to be attached to Discovery undetected, taking engineer Jett Reno hostage in the process. Book convinces Ndoye to help them destroy the DMA.
54	12	"Species Ten-C"	Olatunde Osunsanmi	Kyle Jarrow	March 10, 2022
Discovery releases the hydrocarbon representing peace onto the hyperfield. It is soon pulled into the structure and surrounded by an orb made of an unknown substance. Members of Species 10-C respond with more hydrocarbons and a light pattern which the crew deciphers as a "bridge language" similar to Lincos that uses mathematical equations. 10-C members use the language to question why the DMA was destroyed by Tarka's weapon, and the crew are able to communicate their fear of the DMA. On Book's ship, Tarka plans to use Ndoye to ignite a plasma stream from Discovery that will allow them to escape the orb and fly directly to the DMA's power source. Reno realizes that if Tarka takes the power source now, it will destroy the hyperfield and all inside it and likely still destroy Earth and Ni'Var. Book confronts Tarka about this, but Tarka uses his upgrades to the ship to restrain Book. As the crew of Discovery attempt to ask 10-C to withdraw the DMA, Ndoye enacts Tarka's plan and Book's ship escapes. The 10-C members stop communicating. Reno is able to get a message to Burnham explaining Tarka's plan.
55	13	"Coming Home"	Olatunde Osunsanmi	Michelle Paradise	March 17, 2022
Tarka begins dismantling the power source's container, causing dangerous plasma bursts. T'Rina learns that the minds of the 10-C are connected and they do not understand that Tarka is acting independently of Discovery. The crew overloads Discovery's spore drive to escape the orb, but are unable to approach Book's ship due to the plasma. Ndoye offers to make amends by ramming Book's ship with a shuttlecraft, killing Tarka. Ndoye and Reno are beamed to safety, but Book seemingly dies. The crew of Discovery meet members of 10-C on a planet inside the hyperfield and explain that Tarka was working alone, and why. The 10-C turn off the DMA, sparing Earth and Ni'Var, and reveal that they saved Book. Discussing his grief and using his empathic abilities, Book convinces 10-C to stop using the DMA altogether, take down the hyperfield, and start working with others to make amends for the harm caused by the DMA. The 10-C use a wormhole to send Discovery to Earth, which decides to rejoin the Federation. Book is punished for his actions by being sent to help others who have been harmed by the DMA.

== Cast and characters ==
=== Main ===
- Sonequa Martin-Green as Michael Burnham
- Doug Jones as Saru
- Anthony Rapp as Paul Stamets
- Mary Wiseman as Sylvia Tilly
- Wilson Cruz as Hugh Culber
- Blu del Barrio as Adira Tal
- David Ajala as Cleveland "Book" Booker
- Tig Notaro as Jett Reno

=== Recurring ===
- Oded Fehr as Charles Vance
- Ian Alexander as Gray Tal
- Chelah Horsdal as Laira Rillak
- Tara Rosling as T'Rina
- Annabelle Wallis as the voice of Zora
- David Cronenberg as Kovich
- Shawn Doyle as Ruon Tarka
- Phumzile Sitole as Diatta Ndoye
- Hiro Kanagawa as Hirai

=== Notable guests ===
- Bill Irwin as Su'Kal
- Sonja Sohn as Gabrielle Burnham
- Rachael Ancheril as Nhan
- Stacey Abrams as the President of United Earth

== Production ==
=== Development ===
Active development on a 13-episode fourth season of Star Trek: Discovery began by January 2020, during production on the series' third season. By March, a fifth season was also in development with the intention of production on the fourth and fifth seasons taking place back-to-back, but these plans were delayed by the COVID-19 pandemic. Pre-production on the fourth season began in Toronto, Canada, on August 17. Executive producers Alex Kurtzman and Michelle Paradise, the co-showrunners of the series, officially announced the season on October 16, the day after the third season premiered. Filming was scheduled to begin on November 2.

=== Writing ===
The series' writers room began working on the season remotely by August 2020. Pandemic-related production delays allowed them to get "quite ahead in scripts" compared to previous seasons, according to Kurtzman. He soon confirmed that all seasons after the third would continue to be set in the 32nd century. Writing for the fourth season ended in mid-May 2021, and took place entirely via Zoom so the writers room never met in person. Because they, and the rest of the world, were impacted by the pandemic during the creation of the season, the writers wanted to acknowledge it in some way without literally including a pandemic in the story. Paradise explained that Star Trek series have always reflected the real world in this way, and the season's story was designed to be a metaphor for the pandemic without being one-to-one: the main "antagonist" of the season is a giant, destructive space anomaly that the characters do not understand. To establish the impact that this anomaly can have rather than just explain how big and destructive it is, the writers chose to have it destroy the planet Kwejian—the homeworld of Cleveland "Book" Booker—in the season's first episode. This has an ongoing effect on Book throughout the season, and the writers wanted to test his relationship with protagonist Michael Burnham.

"Representation matters. It matters to see a version of yourself on screen. It matters there are non-binary and transgender characters. It matters that there is a Black woman in the captain's chair. It matters that there is a gay couple on our show. We will continue to do that for the show, and the world we live in, but also, to honor the Star Trek legacy."

— Showrunner Michelle Paradise on representation in the season

The third season ends with Burnham becoming the captain of Discovery, which star Sonequa Martin-Green said was a new beginning for the series. Paradise said the character had "grown in many ways" over the first three seasons, and the fourth would see her continue to grow as captain. The writers approached Burnhams's character arc in each episode by asking what her journey as a captain would be, and by the season finale she has learned to deal with captain-specific issues such as making tough calls and navigating political situations. The previous captain of Discovery, Saru, begins the season on his homeworld of Kaminar but eventually returns to the ship. He develops a relationship with T'Rina, the president of Ni'Var, which is a storyline that the writers decided to explore after seeing unexpected chemistry between the two characters during the third season.

Paradise said the writers always intended to form a "really lovely" family unit in the third season with Paul Stamets and Hugh Culber, a gay couple, and the non-binary Adira. This is extended to Adira's transgender boyfriend Gray, who is dead but whose consciousness is still connected to Adira. The third season promised that Gray would be "seen" by everyone, in a metaphor for representation, and the fourth season does this by transferring his consciousness into a synthetic body (the same technology that was used for Jean-Luc Picard in the first season of Star Trek: Picard). Actor Ian Alexander had a lot more "hands-on involvement" with Gray's storyline in the fourth season. Another metaphor for representation is seen in the storyline for Zora, Discovery's advanced computer. She becomes sentient in the season, and is deemed to be a new lifeform that officially joins Starfleet. This is similar to the android Data in the series Star Trek: The Next Generation.

After revealing that Earth is no longer part of the United Federation of Planets in the third season, the writers knew that Earth's rejoining the Federation would be a pivotal moment, and decided that this would be a two-season arc that concludes in the fourth-season finale. They wanted the season to explore ethical questions in a similar way to Star Trek: The Original Series and The Next Generation, to make Discovery feel more like traditional Star Trek. The season also explores the mental health struggles of some characters, which was relevant to the creative team due to the real-world impacts of the pandemic. For Species 10-C, an unknown species that created the destructive anomaly, they wanted to create a species that was unlike any seen before in Star Trek or other science fiction franchises. They especially wanted the species to be difficult to communicate with, so the characters could not rely on their universal translators, and worked with science consultant Erin Macdonald as well as METI (Messaging to Extra-Terrestrial Intelligence) to understand what the new species could be.

=== Casting ===
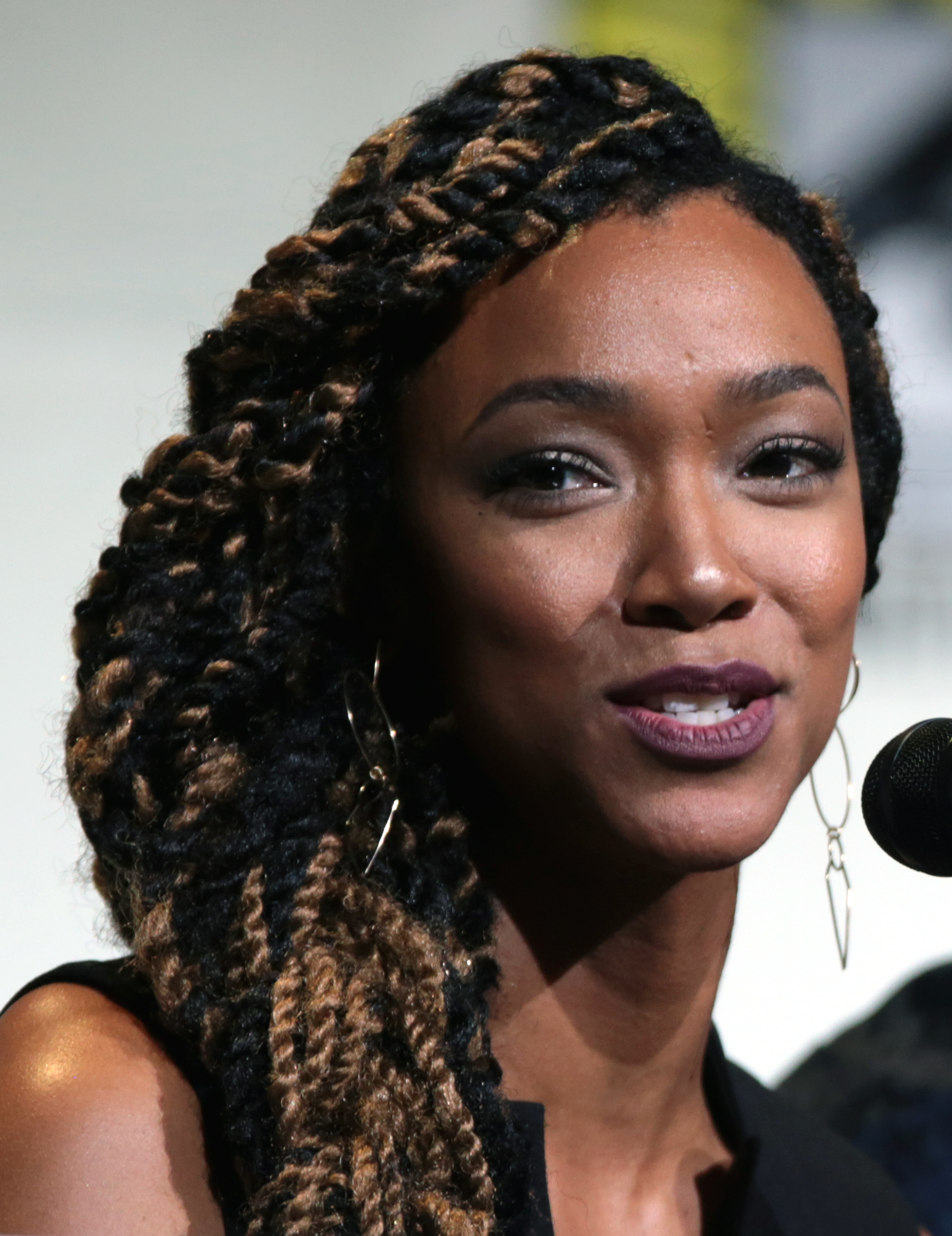
Sonequa Martin-Green stars as Michael Burnham, captain of the USS Discovery

The season stars the returning Sonequa Martin-Green as Michael Burnham, Doug Jones as Saru, Anthony Rapp as Paul Stamets, Mary Wiseman as Sylvia Tilly, Wilson Cruz as Hugh Culber, and David Ajala as Cleveland "Book" Booker, as well as Blu del Barrio reprising their recurring guest role as Adira Tal from the third season. Tig Notaro was asked to reprise her recurring guest role of Jett Reno in the season for two different filming blocks. She chose not to travel to Toronto for filming in November 2020 due to the pandemic, but hoped that conditions would be safer in May 2021 to allow her to travel for the second block; Notaro confirmed in May 2021 that she was in Toronto to film all of her scenes for the season over two weeks. Notaro is credited as a main cast member for her appearances in the season. Despite Tilly leaving Discovery in the fourth episode, Wiseman remained a series regular and returned for the season finale.

Other guest stars reprising their roles from the third season include Oded Fehr as Admiral Charles Vance, Ian Alexander as Gray Tal, Bill Irwin as Su'Kal, Tara Rosling as Ni'Var President T'Rina, Annabelle Wallis as the voice of Zora, Sonja Sohn as Burnham's mother, Gabrielle, David Cronenberg as Dr. Kovich, Phumzile Sitole as Earth General Diatta Ndoye, and former main cast member Rachael Ancheril as Commander Nhan. Kenneth Mitchell, who made guest appearances as different characters in the previous seasons, said in August 2021 that he would have a unique role in the fourth season after the progression of his ALS diagnosis limited his ability to move and speak un-aided; he is represented by the USS Mitchell, a starship named for the actor that appears in the season finale. New recurring guests for the season include Chelah Horsdal as Laira Rillak, the Federation President, Shawn Doyle as Ruon Tarka, and Hiro Kanagawa as Dr. Hirai. In the season finale, politician and activist Stacey Abrams appears as the President of United Earth. Paradise and Kurtzman had contacted Abrams about making the appearance knowing that she was already a fan of the series and franchise, and they did not include her name in documentation for filming to help keep her role a secret.

Additionally, Osric Chau portrays Tarka's missing friend Oros, Rothaford Gray is introduced as Book's father Tareckx, and Ache Hernandez and Luca Doulgeris return as Book's brother Kyheem and nephew Leto, respectively. The crew of Discovery also return for the season, including Emily Coutts as pilot Keyla Detmer, Patrick Kwok-Choon as tactical officer Gen Rhys, Oyin Oladejo as operations officer Joann Owosekun, Ronnie Rowe Jr. as communications officer R.A. Bryce, Sara Mitich as Nilsson, David Benjamin Tomlinson as Linus the Saurian, and Raven Dauda as Dr. Tracy Pollard. Rowe has a smaller role than previously after being cast in the series The Porter, and Bryce is replaced as communications officer in some episodes by Christopher, who is portrayed by Orville Cummings.

=== Design ===
The crew of the Discovery were given the primarily gray uniforms of other 32nd-century Starfleet officers at the end of the third season, but the producers soon realized that those costumes clashed with the Discovery's existing gray hallway sets. Costume designer Gersha Phillips looked at various options that still kept the gray color and settled on more colorful costumes that have a gray stripe on the front. The uniforms use the same primary colors as Star Trek: The Next Generation (red for command, gold for operations, and blue for science) but with white uniforms for medical officers like in previous Discovery seasons. The new uniforms also have matching dress-uniform variants. The EV spacesuits seen in the season are the sixth or seventh iteration designed for the series. Phillips said they wanted each version to be more sleek and more comfortable than the last.

For the first episode's opening sequence, Phillips mistakenly assumed that Burnham's mission with Book was a courier mission and designed a leather coat for Martin-Green to wear. The producers corrected her that it was actually a Starfleet mission but asked her to keep the coat and just make it "cleaner" and Starfleet-appropriate. Martin-Green loved wearing the coat and felt it showed Burnham's "boldness" now that she is captain, while Phillips noted that it was now available to use as a uniform-variant for all Starfleet officers on the series. The Kelpien costumes on Kaminar were designed to be more organic than the Starfleet uniforms, but Phillips still wanted them to be sleek to match the aesthetic of the 32nd century. Saru wears a special pin on his chest to represent that he is a councilmember on Kaminar, and prop master Mario Moreira explained that the pin was designed to reflect Kaminar's two cultures which have united since the earlier seasons: a central stone represents the obelisks of the Ba'ul people, surrounded by flowing lines that evoke the Kelpiens' movements and the seaweed that they collect. The props department questioned whether Saru should continue to wear this pin once he returns to his Starfleet uniform but realized that there was precedent for this in the cultural baldric worn by Worf in The Next Generation. Zora and Gray play a Trill board game in "Stormy Weather" that was designed by Moreira's team to be a futuristic version of chess. He said there were many discussions about the design and rules for the game. For the casino in "All In", writer Sean Cochran used his father's knowledge as a gambling expert along with a hired consultant to help inform what details were needed on set. The props team played all of the card games before filming, reverse-engineered from the desired results, to ensure that the cards could be played in the correct order by the actors during filming. The set for the casino was a re-dressing of the space station set from the first episode.

The producers wanted to match the writers' unique approach to Species 10-C by designing creatures that did not look like any other aliens from science fiction, working with Glenn Hetrick of Alchemy Studio, who provides special makeup and prosthetics for the series, and creature designer Neville Page to create them. Executive producer and producing director Olatunde Osunsanmi did not want the creatures to be able to walk, and thought was put into what a creature would biologically need to be able to float. Osunsanmi also wanted them to be "skyscraper tall", but their size had to be reduced so they could still fit in frame with the humanoid characters.

=== Filming ===
Filming began at Pinewood Toronto Studios in Toronto, Canada, on November 2, 2020, under the working title Mill Street. Production was previously expected to take place from July 2020 to January 2021, filming back-to-back with a potential fifth season, but these plans were delayed by the COVID-19 pandemic. Kurtzman said in October 2020 that filming would be a "systematised, militarised operation" due to the pandemic, explaining that the season's crew would work in "pods" to minimize the potential spread of the virus. The cast traveled to Toronto early to quarantine for 14 days, per the Canadian government's requirements, and during filming the cast and crew were tested for COVID-19 three times a week. Jones said filming was slower because of the precautions taken on set; each episode took one day longer to film than in previous seasons.

Filming taking place on the season's video wall set that was built by visual effects company Pixomondo. A digital background is displayed on the horseshoe-shaped volume surrounding the physical set.

Kurtzman revealed in October 2020 that Paramount+ was constructing a video wall to allow for virtual production on the season as well as the series Star Trek: Strange New Worlds, utilizing technology similar to the StageCraft system that was developed for the Disney+ series The Mandalorian. The new virtual set was built in Toronto by visual effects company Pixomondo, and features a 270-degree, 70 feet (21 m) by 30 feet (9.1 m) horseshoe-shaped LED volume with additional LED panels in the ceiling to aid with lighting. The technology uses the game engine software Unreal Engine to display computer-generated backgrounds on the LED screens in real-time during filming, which visual effects supervisor Jason Zimmerman noted was especially useful for creating the planets that are visited in the series; due to the pandemic, the production was unable to film on location outside of North America to portray alien planets as they did for the third season. The virtual stage was still being installed by the time production took a break for Christmas in late December. The majority of filming for the first two episodes had been completed by then, but scenes requiring the video wall were set to be filmed after the break once the technology was ready. Zimmerman oversaw the installation and use of the volume remotely from Los Angeles, and said the production design and art departments were involved with the visual effects earlier than usual since they needed to be ready for filming in the volume. Doug McCullough took over as production designer for the season, and used the technology to create environments that otherwise would not have been possible, such as the large prison in "The Examples". Other virtual locations included the Discovery shuttle bay (which appeared in previous seasons without the technology), the Kaminar Council Chamber, and the Federation Headquarters shuttle bay. Almost every episode of the season used virtual production for at least one scene.

Philip Lanyon was the lead director of photography for the season after previously working on an episode of Discovery's second season and also serving as lead director of photography for the first season of Star Trek: Picard. Franco Tata and Chris Mably were also cinematographers for the fourth season. Lanyon began his work on the season by developing a "visual mood board" for the cinematography with Osunsanmi. The season was filmed with Arri Alexa Mini, Mini LF, and SXT cameras, and Lanyon brought back Cooke Optics' Anamorphic/i Special Flare lenses from his previous Star Trek work because they gave him control over the lens flares that arise from all of the practical light on the Discovery sets. He also chose to start using Anamorphic/i Full Frame Plus SF lenses on the season, believing that the full frame format of those lenses created a cleaner image and allowed him to get closer to the actors with a wider field of view without distorting the image in the way that some wide-angle lenses do. The full frame lenses were just used for the virtual production scenes on the season's first eleven episodes, and the softer backgrounds created by the lenses helped control artefacts from the LED screens such as moiré patterns. Lanyon and Osunsanmi then used the full frame format as the primary lenses for the last two episodes of the season. Lanyon felt the cinematography for the season, especially with the addition of virtual production, gave it a "bigger world" with a different visual style when compared to the first three seasons. Coincidentally, cinematographer Glen Keenan chose to use the full frame lenses on Strange New Worlds around the same time that Lanyon selected them for this season.

Film composer and editor John Ottman, a big Star Trek fan, directed the fourth episode of the season. Ottman helped Kurtzman oversee the editing of the third season in return for getting to direct in the fourth. On April 22, 2021, production on the season was paused after a "Zone A" individual (referring to key cast members as well as the crew who are in contact with them) came in "close proximity" away from set with someone who tested positive for COVID-19. This was detected through Ontario's contact tracing system, and the individual began 14 days of quarantine. The rest of the season's almost 80-person production were not required to quarantine and filming was set to start again on May 6. There was also a lockdown in the Toronto area at that time, but film and television productions were allowed to continue. One of the series' pandemic protocols saw the bridge crew of Discovery rotated so the same actors would not always be on set. This is explained in the series by Burnham requiring all crewmembers to take time off for their mental and emotional health. Production for the season was originally set to end on June 10, but pandemic delays meant this end date was extended to August or September. In mid-July, Martin-Green said they had "a little bit more [filming] to do" for the season, and much of the cast wrapped for the season by early August. It was during August that Abrams travelled to Toronto to film her appearance for the finale, and she requested that the cast and crew not spoil the events of the season for her so she could still watch it as a fan. Paradise travelled to Toronto on August 9 for the final weeks of pickup shots and location shooting, and announced that filming for the season had been completed on August 23.

=== Visual effects ===
In addition to working on the season's virtual production effects throughout pre-production and filming, Pixomondo also provided "post-shoot touchup work" to remove the seams between the video wall and ceiling, as well as traditional visual effects such as digital matte paintings. Other visual effects vendors for the season included Crafty Apes VFX, Outpost VFX, Switch VFX, and Gradient Effects. Outpost worked on episodes eight and nine, creating the dead planet that Book and Tarka hide near and adapting the series' programmable matter effects—which were developed by Pixomondo for the third season—to be used as a weapon by Tarka.

=== Music ===
Composer Jeff Russo confirmed in December 2020 that he would begin work on the fourth season once the third season was completed. By April 2021, he was considering using musical themes in the season that he had composed for Noah Hawley's planned Star Trek film before that project was put on pause in August 2020. "Stormy Weather" features Wallis's Zora singing the song of the same name, first sung by Ethel Waters in 1933. This song was included on a soundtrack album for the season alongside selections from Russo's score. The album was released digitally by Lakeshore Records on August 26, 2022. All music by Jeff Russo:

Original Series Soundtrack: Season 4
No.	Title	Length
1.	"Kwejian Destroyed"	1:19
2.	"Angry Butterfly People"	4:01
3.	"Running from Alshain"	4:17
4.	"Reopening the Academy"	3:19
5.	"Gray's New Body"	2:36
6.	"Michael Guides Book"	3:11
7.	"Book Breaks Down"	2:27
8.	"J'Vini Threatens"	2:06
9.	"J'Vini's Story"	3:43
10.	"Saving the Abronians"	2:26
11.	"Kaminar Sea Frogs"	1:06
12.	"Saving Adira"	3:45
13.	"Tarka"	0:48
14.	"Tarka's Theory"	2:09
15.	"Hugh and Kovich"	3:11
16.	"Tarka's Model"	2:37
17.	"Family Tree"	2:19
18.	"Trying to Abort"	2:28
19.	"Just Michael"	1:49
20.	"The Poker Game"	2:51
21.	"Let's End It"	2:50
22.	"Saru Opens Up to T'Rina"	1:49
23.	"Hallucinations"	2:13
24.	"It's the Dust"	2:25
25.	"In the Nursery"	4:38
26.	"The Evacuation"	2:39
27.	"One Way Out"	1:38
28.	"Abandon Ship"	1:50
29.	"DMA Stopped"	2:45
30.	"Book Talks to 10C / Going Home"	5:13
31.	"Wrap Up"	4:29
32.	"Zora Sings Stormy Weather" (performed by Annabelle Wallis)	1:12
Total length:		1:26:09

== Marketing ==
In February 2021, Martin-Green appeared in a marketing campaign for Super Bowl LV advertising the rebranded streaming service Paramount+. Martin-Green then revealed the first teaser for the season during a panel for the "First Contact Day" virtual event on April 5, 2021, celebrating the franchise on the fictional holiday marking first contact between humans and aliens in the Star Trek universe. The teaser revealed the season's new uniforms. A full trailer and key art poster were revealed during a panel for the season at New York Comic Con in October. Multiple commentators discussing the trailer highlighted Burnham's new role as captain. Scott Snowden at Space.com felt the approach to Burnham had not changed despite the promotion and said the trailer's premise of "a strange anomaly threatens the entire galaxy" was essentially the same as the third season's story.

== Release ==
=== Streaming and broadcast ===
The season premiered on Paramount+ in the United States on November 18, 2021, and the first seven episodes were released through December 30. The remaining six episodes were released from February 10 to March 17, 2022. Bell Media broadcast the season in Canada on the specialty channels CTV Sci-Fi Channel (English) and Z (French) on the same day as the U.S., before streaming episodes on Crave. In August 2023, Star Trek content was removed from Crave and the season began streaming on Paramount+ in Canada. It would continue to be broadcast on CTV Sci-Fi and be available on CTV.ca and the CTV app.

Netflix originally held the streaming rights for the season in another 188 countries as with the previous seasons, but two days before the season's international debut, ViacomCBS announced that it had bought back the international streaming rights to Discovery from Netflix effective immediately. This meant the season would be streamed in other countries on Paramount+ once the service was available there some time in 2022. The announcement led to backlash from international fans for its timing and the fact that the season would not be available in other countries at the same time as it was released in the U.S. and Canada. On November 24, ViacomCBS acknowledged the backlash and said the season would be made available internationally through several avenues: it would begin releasing on Paramount+ for markets where the service had already launched, starting with the first two episodes on November 26; episodes would air multiple times a week on the free streaming service Pluto TV in other territories; and episodes would be available for digital purchase in some countries.

=== Home media ===
The season was released on DVD, Blu-Ray, and Limited Edition Steelbook formats in the U.S. on December 6, 2022. The release includes over 90 minutes of bonus features, including deleted scenes, a gag reel, audio commentary for the season finale, and featurettes on the making of the season, filming during the COVID-19 pandemic, Burnham becoming captain, and the introduction of virtual production technology.

== Reception ==
=== Viewership ===
In December 2021, Paramount+ revealed that Star Trek: Discovery was the most watched series on the streaming service for its inaugural year. Audience demand analytics company Parrot Analytics, who estimate streaming viewership based on global "demand expressions", listed Discovery as the 15th most in-demand streaming series of 2021 and calculated that it was 19 times more in-demand than the average United States series. It was the only Paramount+ series in Parrot's top 20 list for the year. Whip Media, who track viewership data for the 19 million worldwide users of their TV Time app, ranked Discovery in the top 10 original streaming series for U.S. viewership the week of the season's premiere, as well as each week from the third episode's release until the end of the season's first half. The series returned to the top 10 list for the release of the season's last four episodes. According to anti-piracy analytics firm MUSO, who measure global unlicensed streaming and torrent data, the fourth season of Discovery was one of the 10 most-pirated series in November and December 2021.

=== Critical response ===
The review aggregator website Rotten Tomatoes reported 88% approval with an average rating of 7.7/10 based on 17 reviews. The website's critical consensus reads, "Michael Burnham finally comes into her own—and so does Discovery—in a confident fourth season that embraces the series' more heartfelt take on the Star Trek mythos."

=== Accolades ===
The season is one of 200 television series that received the ReFrame Stamp for the years 2021 to 2022. The stamp is awarded by the gender equity coalition ReFrame and industry database IMDbPro for film and television projects that are proven to have gender-balanced hiring, with stamps being awarded to projects that hire female-identifying people, especially women of color, in four out of eight key roles for their production.

Year	Award	Category	Recipient	Result	Ref.
2022	Critics' Choice Super Awards	Best Science Fiction/Fantasy Series	Star Trek: Discovery	Nominated	
2022	Critics' Choice Super Awards	Best Actress in a Science Fiction/Fantasy Series	Sonequa Martin-Green	Nominated	
2022	GLAAD Media Awards	Outstanding Drama Series	Star Trek: Discovery	Nominated	
2022	Golden Reel Awards	Outstanding Achievement in Sound Editing – Series 1 Hour – Dialogue / ADR	Matthew E. Taylor, Sean Heissinger, and Cormac Funge (for "Kobayashi Maru")	Nominated	
2022	Golden Reel Awards	Outstanding Achievement in Sound Editing – Series 1 Hour – Effects / Foley	Matthew E. Taylor, Michael Schapiro, Harry Cohen, Katie Halliday, Andrew Twite, Clay Weber, Alyson Moore, and Chris Moriana (for "Kobayashi Maru")	Nominated	
2022	Golden Reel Awards	Outstanding Achievement in Sound Editing – Series 1 Hour – Music	Moira Marquis and Matea Prljevic (for "Kobayashi Maru")	Nominated	
2022	Make-Up Artists and Hair Stylists Guild Awards	Best Special Make-Up Effects in Television and New Media Series	Glenn Hetrick, Rocky Faulkner, Nicola Bendrey, and Chris Burgoyne	Won	
2022	Saturn Awards	Best Science Fiction Series (Streaming)	Star Trek: Discovery	Nominated	
2023	Canadian Society of Cinematographers Awards	Dramatic Series Cinematography – Commercial	Philip Lanyon (for "Coming Home")	Nominated	
2023	GLAAD Media Awards	Outstanding Drama Series	Star Trek: Discovery	Nominated	
2023	NAACP Image Awards	Outstanding Costume Design (Television or Film)	Gersha Phillips, Carly Nicodemo, Heather Constable, Christina Cattle, Sheryl Willock, Becky MacKinnon	Nominated	
