= Terra Firma (Star Trek: Discovery) =

- Star Trek: Discovery episodes
- Promotional poster
- Episode nos.: Season 3 Episodes 9 and 10
- Directed by: Omar Madha; Chloe Domont
- Story by: Bo Yeon Kim; Erika Lippoldt; Alan McElroy
- Teleplay by: Alan McElroy; Kalinda Vazquez
- Cinematography by: Glen Keenan; Crescenzo G.P. Notarile
- Editing by: Chad Rubel
- Original release dates: December 10, 2020; December 17, 2020
- Running time: 48 minutes; 49 minutes

Guest appearances
- Michelle Yeoh as Philippa Georgiou; Oded Fehr as Charles Vance; Blu del Barrio as Adira Tal; Hannah Cheesman as Airiam; David Cronenberg as Kovich; Paul Guilfoyle as the Guardian of Forever; Rekha Sharma as Ellen Landry; Daniel Kash as Duggan; Tig Notaro as Jett Reno

Episode chronology
| ← Previous "The Sanctuary" | Next → "Su'Kal" |
- Star Trek: Discovery season 3

"Terra Firma" is the ninth and tenth episode of the third season of the American television series Star Trek: Discovery, and the 38th and the 39th episode overall. The two-parter begins in the 32nd century, and follows Emperor Philippa Georgiou as she returns to the Mirror Universe. The story for both parts was written by Bo Yeon Kim, Erika Lippoldt, and Alan McElroy. The teleplay for the first part was written by McElroy, with Omar Madha directing. The teleplay for the second part was written by Kalinda Vazquez, with Chloe Domont directing.

Special guest star Michelle Yeoh portrays Georgiou alongside series regulars Sonequa Martin-Green, Doug Jones, Anthony Rapp, Mary Wiseman, Wilson Cruz, and David Ajala. The two-part story writes Georgiou out of the series, setting up a potential Section 31-based spin-off series starring Yeoh from writers Kim and Lippoldt. It does this using the Guardian of Forever from Star Trek: The Original Series, with guest star Paul Guilfoyle portraying a personification of the Guardian. The episodes return to the Mirror Universe for the first time since the first season, allowing costume designer Gersha Phillips to make improved costumes for the setting. Filming took place in Toronto, Canada around December 2019, and included location shooting in temperatures below freezing.

The first part was released on the streaming service CBS All Access on December 10, 2020. The second part was released a week later on December 17. Both parts received mixed reviews from critics.

== Plot ==
=== Part 1 ===
Kovich, a mysterious Starfleet operative born in the 3100s, explains to Hugh Culber that because Philippa Georgiou has travelled through time and dimensions, her molecules have become too unstable and will decay. Culber learns from Zora, the ship's computer, that Georgiou has a possibility of survival if she beams down to the surface of an uninhabited planet named Dannus V to find a cure.

Paul Stamets and Adira can trace the Burn to a specific nebula's source and recognize it as a Kelpien starship's distress call. Now on Dannus V's surface, Georgiou and Michael Burnham encounter a mysterious stranger who reveals himself as Carl. Carl shows Georgiou a door, which he says is a portal, prompting Georgiou to hesitate about going through initially. Carl convinces her to cross, and Georgiou finds herself in the Mirror Universe, on board the ISS Discovery, during the time before she visited the Prime Universe.

After resuming her duties as Emperor of the Terran Empire, Georgiou discovers that her time in the Prime Universe had changed her. Michael Burnham betrays her, but Georgiou decides to spare her life under the guise of ordering subordinates to torture her in an agony booth.

=== Part 2 ===
Georgiou tries to convince Burnham to rule the Terran Empire faithfully by her side, but Burnham ignores her, refusing to speak or eat from her prison cell. Georgiou resolves to torture Burnham until she pledges her alliance to the Empire. Initially, this does not work, but Burnham decides to go along with her adopted mother. Georgiou orders her to kill all of her former co-conspirators and Gabriel Lorca's spies. After finding one of Lorca's henchman in orbit of Risa, Burnham executes him in the brig and reveals her guise to assassinate Georgiou.

The two engage in a fight. The battle mortally wounds Georgiou and Burnham. Upon closing her eyes for the final time, Georgiou finds herself back on Dannus V. Carl then informs them that he is the Guardian of Forever and that he closed his portals to normal humans during the Temporal Wars. He also claims that Georgiou's experience was a test that she has passed and can be given a second chance in life.

The Guardian opens up another portal for Georgiou to go through, and she and Burnham bid farewell; Georgiou is sent to a time when the Prime and Mirror Universes are more aligned so she can survive. On Discovery, Book wishes to be useful aboard the ship and provides Emerald Chain technology to assist the crew with locating the nebula where a Kelpien distress call is originating. Later, the crew holds a small service for Georgiou.

== Production ==
=== Development ===
In January 2019, Star Trek: Discovery co-creator and showrunner Alex Kurtzman said a planned spin-off series featuring special guest star Michelle Yeoh as Philippa Georgiou was not expected until after the third season of Discovery was completed. Executive producer Heather Kadin said Yeoh's presence in the third season could lead to a direct tie-in with the spin-off. A month later, CBS All Access officially renewed Discovery for a third season, with writer Michelle Paradise promoted to co-showrunner alongside series co-creator Alex Kurtzman. The spin-off series' showrunners, Bo Yeon Kim and Erika Lippoldt, are also writers on Discovery, and they developed Georgiou's character arc in the third season.

In mid-2019, the series' crew had an overview meeting for the third season, during which the plan to write Georgiou out of the season in preparation for the planned Section 31–based spin-off series was revealed by the writers. They also revealed that this storyline would involve a return to the Mirror Universe from the first season, allowing the production to prepare for that. In October 2020, the ninth and tenth episodes of the third season were revealed to be titled "Terra Firma, Part 1" and "Terra Firma, Part 2", with a story by Kim, Lippoldt, and Alan McElroy. The teleplay for the first part was written by McElroy, with Kalinda Vazquez writing the second part. The first part was directed by Omar Madha, and the second part was directed by Chloe Domont. The writing credits for the second part use "written by" for Kim, Lippoldt, and McElroy rather than the usual "story by" that is used in the first part.

=== Writing ===
After developing Georgiou's story with "a lot of care" throughout the third season, Kim and Lippoldt use "Terra Firma" to write the character out of Discovery and send her to an unknown place and time where the planned spin-off series is set. Their initial plan for "Terra Firma" was a smaller story involving Georgiou and Burnham visiting a planet with a lone house and garden, similar to the Star Trek: The Next Generation episode "The Survivors" (1989). They would have met a gardener who would be revealed as the Guardian of Forever from the Star Trek: The Original Series episode "The City on the Edge of Forever" (1967). Georgiou would choose to spend a "perfect day" with Burnham, including baking an apple pie with her. The writers ultimately felt that they needed a "larger, cathartic story", and decided to return to the Mirror Universe setting from the first season instead.

By sending Georgiou back to the Mirror Universe, the writers were able to show how much she has changed since she came to the Prime Universe in the first season, with Paradise feeling that those changes are not as clear while the character is among the Prime Universe crew of the USS Discovery. This plays into the main theme of the third season, which is the importance of connection. Georgiou learns that she has grown due to her connections with the Discovery crew and is better for it. The first episode includes an in-universe performance of Georgiou's history becoming a conqueror and the Emperor of the Terran Empire. Paradise noted that this sequence would have originally been a celebration for Georgiou, but after her experiences in the Prime Universe the play now feels hollow to her. The sequence features aerial performers on aerial silk ribbons as a metaphor for blood.

The writers wanted a "timey-wimey solution" for sending Georgiou to the setting of the spin-off series, which Kurtzman previously said would be "an area of the Trek universe that's never really been explored geographically. It has a new mythology to it". They considered using the character Q from The Next Generation or a weapon from the Temporal Wars before deciding on the Guardian. They had been "itching" to use the character in Discovery for some time, and felt they could be flexible with the Guardian since its original "rules" were contradicted in the Star Trek: The Animated Series episode "Yesteryear" (1973); they introduce a new personification of the Guardian named "Carl", inspired by astronomer and author Carl Sagan. Sagan was suggested as an influence by Kurtzman and Paradise because of his "tendency to philosophize about all the unknown the galaxy holds".

The Mirror Universe as seen in the episodes is an alternate version from the universe that was seen previously in the series. The episodes are set a few days before the first season's Mirror Universe storyline begins, when Georgiou is "in her prime" as Emperor of the Terran Empire. In "Terra Firma", Georgiou is revealed to have "time sickness", which is caused by the "Prime Universe" and the Mirror Universe—where the character is from—being too far apart in the 32nd century, forcing the character to go to an earlier time period at the end of the episodes. To help explain this, the first part of "Terra Firma" reveals that a temporal agent, Yor, previously crossed over to the Prime Universe from the alternate reality created during the film Star Trek (2009). Yor later died from time sickness. This is the first reference made by a Star Trek series to the alternate timeline of the film franchise.

=== Design ===
To reflect the Mirror Universe setting, the opening title sequence for the second part is inverted from the standard sequence and shown in negative. The newspaper that "Carl", the Guardian of Forever, is reading in the episodes features numerous Easter eggs collated by the series' script supervisor Dan Hindmarch. He took inspiration from Kim and Lippoldt, received feedback on his plans from Paradise and McElroy, and then handed his work to the series' art department, including Bruce Wrighte and Natasha Phillips. They designed and created the actual newspaper using Hindmarch's work. The newspaper is called The Star Dispatch, which is the same as a newspaper from "The City on the Edge of Forever". It includes references to the USS Jenolan and the Tkon Empire from The Next Generation episodes "Relics" (1992) and "The Last Outpost" (1987), respectively.

Costume designer Gersha Phillips wanted to use the return to the Mirror Universe to improve on the costumes that were designed for the first season, for which she did not have enough time or budget to do what she wanted. The armor worn by the characters was made using 3D-printed molds to create leather plates, with 3D-printed designs layered on top. The pieces were then covered in chrome to give them "a much better look and finish ... they're sleek". Medals and ornaments added to the armor were created by the series' props department. Phillips was inspired by the 1970s series Space: 1999 and Logan's Run for the costumes. The series' costume department went through a lot of different fabric options before settling on a fleece-backed jersey fabric for the uniforms worn by the Mirror Universe characters under their armor. The fabric had "a loftiness to it", could be manipulated by the costume department, and looked different from the regular Star Trek: Discovery uniforms. They used glue to bond the fabric to scuba net to give it a molded, form-fitting shape. Phillips uses bonding instead of sewing for the series' costumes, as well as laser cutting, to help them appear as if they have been manufactured in the future.

Georgiou has a more "casual" look in the Mirror Universe than she had in the first season which Phillips called her "day look". It includes a fur cape, made with strips of fur sewn together to make it light enough for Yeoh to wear. Phillips wanted to create an elaborate metal headdress for Georgiou in the first season, inspired by an image of sunrays she had seen, but it "completely failed" and was "this elaborate idea that crashed and burned." She revisited the headdress idea for "Terra Firma", and the costume department found an artist in Toronto, Canada, who was able to create it using plastic, lightweight metal foil, and beads. A smaller-scale version made of softer material was created for the Georgiou performer in the first part's play sequence. That sequence features acrobatic performers using aerial silk. Phillips had assumed that aerial silk performers used actual silk, but the ribbons are actually made from an abrasive nylon-mesh. This was a learning curve for Phillips, who had never worked with aerial silk performers before. She double-layered all of the performers' costumes to ensure they would not be ripped by the nylon-mesh, and also ensured there was nothing dangling from the costumes that would be caught on the ribbons.

=== Casting ===
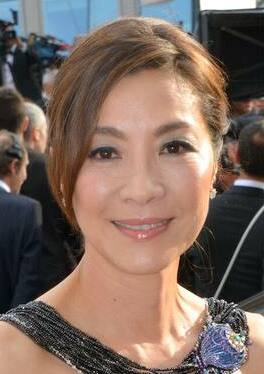
Special guest star Michelle Yeoh's character Philippa Georgiou is written out of the series in "Terra Firma".

The episodes star series regulars Sonequa Martin-Green as Michael Burnham, Doug Jones as Saru, Anthony Rapp as Paul Stamets, Mary Wiseman as Sylvia Tilly, Wilson Cruz as Hugh Culber, and David Ajala as Cleveland "Book" Booker. Michelle Yeoh appears as a special guest star in her recurring role as Philippa Georgiou, alongside other recurring guest stars for the third season of Discovery: Oded Fehr as Charles Vance, Blu del Barrio as Adira Tal, David Cronenberg as Kovich, and Tig Notaro as Jett Reno.

In "Terra Firma", several actors portray Mirror Universe versions of their characters, including guest stars Hannah Cheesman and Rekha Sharma who return from earlier seasons of the series to reprise their roles as Airiam and Ellen Landry, respectively. For Wiseman, playing the Mirror Universe version of her character, nicknamed "Captain Killy", was different from the first season because in those episodes she was playing Tilly who was impersonating Killy. For her performance as the real Killy, Wiseman was inspired by some of her favorite villain characters such as Azula from Avatar: The Last Airbender and Harley Quinn from DC Comics. She also felt that Killy was important representation for certain fans, describing herself as a "full figured, fat, curvy, chunky woman" and saying it is rare for someone like her to "get to feel powerful and use that size to command authority".

The two-part episodes also guest star Paul Guilfoyle as "Carl", the Guardian of Forever. An archival recording of Bart LaRue, the original voice of the Guardian from "The City on the Edge of Forever", is also used in the episodes. The character Gabriel Lorca—portrayed by Jason Isaacs in the first season of Star Trek: Discovery—is mentioned, but does not appear. Lorca's lieutenant Duggan is portrayed by Daniel Kash. Discovery's bridge crew consists of regular co-stars Emily Coutts as Keyla Detmer, Patrick Kwok-Choon as Gen Rhys, Oyin Oladejo as Joann Owosekun, Ronnie Rowe Jr. as R.A. Bryce, and Sara Mitich as Nilsson, with other co-stars for "Part 1" including Julianne Grossman as the voice of Discovery's computer, Hannah Spear as Dr. Issa, and David Benjamin Tomlinson as a Kelpien servant. Spear previously portrayed Saru's sister in the second season.

=== Filming ===
Production on the two episodes took place around December 2019, in Toronto, Canada. The play sequence in "Part 1" took over a day to shoot, with real aerialists performing on set, narrated by Rapp in a theatrical style inspired by his history as a stage actor. The first episode also includes a fight sequence between the Mirror Universe versions of Rhys and Owosekun. This fight was included after Paradise saw Kwok-Choon and Oladejo say they wanted to do more fighting in the series during a panel with the bridge crew at the 2018 Star Trek Las Vegas. They worked with stunt coordinator Christopher McGuire individually to develop their characters' movements before learning the fight choreography. McGuire explained that Yeoh is very specific about her fight sequences, and for her fight with Mirror Burnham at the end of the second episode, she asked that Georgiou's movements all be defensive until she has no choice and kills Burnham. McGuire choreographed the fight and then got feedback on it from Yeoh before filming.

Kim and Lippoldt originally intended for the Guardian's doorway to be in a green field until it was pointed out to them that the episodes would be filmed during winter in Canada. Producing director Olatunde Osunsanmi said the crew wanted to find the "coolest location" they could for the sequence, and the location they settled on was a rocky, gravel-covered area. It snowed on the day of filming, which the cast and crew were not prepared for. The temperature went below 0 degrees, which Paradise said was so cold that the cast and crew's "faces were frozen and they had trouble making their mouths move at some points". The sequence where Burnham and Mirror Georgiou walk through the snow mirrors a scene from the series' premiere episode where Burnham and the Prime Universe Georgiou walk through a desert, with the latter filmed on location in Jordan. Yeoh described the sequence as bringing the characters and actors "full circle" from the premiere, and felt that the snow helped with that despite the cold temperatures.

Osunsanmi stated that Yeoh leaving the series was a big deal for the cast and crew, and they wanted the episodes to be "a send-off [fit for] an Emperor". Yeoh's last day of filming on the series was very emotional for the whole crew. Yeoh found it very difficult to leave the series and the cast and crew, and still found it upsetting to talk about after the episodes were released in December 2020, but she agreed with Kurtzman and Paradise that it was necessary for the character if they were going to make the planned spin-off series.

=== Music ===
Composer Jeff Russo reprises his music for the Mirror Universe from the series' first season during the episodes. He explained that he had been "alluding" to this music to represent Georgiou in earlier episodes, but reprises it fully in "Terra Firma" with the return to the Mirror Universe, even if it is unclear if this is "reality, hallucination, or what's going on".

== Release ==
"Terra Firma, Part 1" was released for streaming on CBS All Access in the United States on December 10, 2020, with "Terra Firma, Part 2" released on All Access on December 17. Bell Media broadcast the episodes in Canada on the specialty channels CTV Sci-Fi Channel (English) and Z (French) on the same day as the U.S., before streaming the episodes on Crave. Netflix has streaming rights for the series in another 188 countries, and released each episode for streaming within 24 hours of its U.S. debut.

== Reception ==
The episodes were widely well-received across general websites and review forums, with commenters likening to Georgiou's return to the Mirror Universe in the plot; however some criticism was noted about the episodes, with some reviewers commenting that the two-parter episode could have been just one normal episode. A review on TrekCore noted the character development story arcs, as well. "But as the plot drags on, you're left waiting for the other shoe to drop. Characters continue to give hints about how Georgiou remains weak and vulnerable, even though she is convinced she's changing the future," said Tell-Tale TV. "It's hard to ever buy that Mirror Burnham changed her loyalty back to Georgiou."

TheYoungFolks split "Terra Firma, Part 1" into two halves: one that takes place in the Prime Universe, and one in the Mirror Universe. They noted that the second half was "by far" the better one, and also commented on the character development and emotional moments dropped in the middle of the episode. FanSided called the episode "overlong" and "lackluster" and thought that Georgiou's story arc across the episode was weak and that the character "deserved better." Another site, What To Watch, had mixed feelings about Part 2, calling it "predictable but satisfying. About the first half of the double-episode, their review said that the likability of the first episode depends on the conflict resolution of the second half.

== Aftershow ==
Episodes of Discovery's aftershow The Ready Room, hosted by Wil Wheaton, were released after both parts of "Terra Firma". The aftershow episode for the first part featured several actors for the series' bridge crew: Emily Coutts, Oyin Oladejo, Patrick Kwok-Choon, Ronnie Rowe Jr., and Sara Mitich. The second aftershow episode featured Yeoh.
