= Blu del Barrio =

American actor (born 1997)

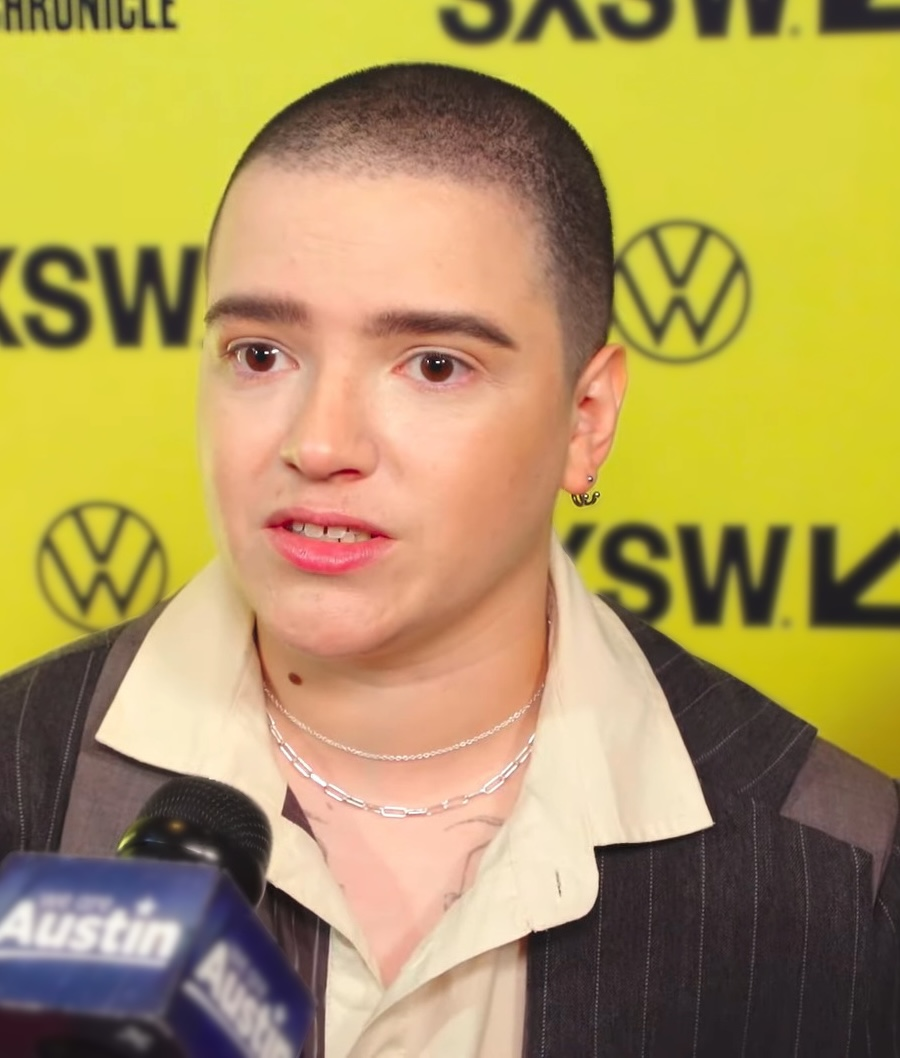
- Blu del Barrio in 2024
- Born: September 15, 1997 (age 29)
- Education: London Academy of Music and Dramatic Art (BA)
- Occupation: Actor
- Years active: 2019–present

Blu del Barrio (born September 15, 1997) is an American actor best known for playing Adira Tal in Star Trek: Discovery. They are the franchise's first openly non-binary actor and played its first non-binary role. Del Barrio has studied and engaged in the performing arts since childhood, graduating from the London Academy of Music and Dramatic Art (LAMDA) in 2019. They are outspoken in support of transgender visibility and inclusivity with accurate depiction in popular media.

== Early life ==
Blu del Barrio was born September 15, 1997. They grew up up in Topanga, California. They came out as non-binary in 2019 and as of April 2025 uses they/he/elle pronouns. Through their whole life, they had difficulty with their gender, realizing they might be non-binary after seeing Lachlan Watson on television. Being cast as a non-binary character in Star Trek: Discovery helped them come out publicly as non-binary. They chose the first name Blu in 2019, in honor of their favorite color from childhood.

Del Barrio studied ballet and theater in California before moving to the UK to study at the London Academy of Music and Dramatic Art (LAMDA), graduating in 2019.

== Career ==
Del Barrio is skilled in stage combat, dance and singing, having acted in theater and short films since they were seven years old.

Del Barrio was cast in their first major role in September 2020 when it was announced that they would join the cast of Star Trek: Discovery as Trill Adira Tal for the series' third season. Del Barrio felt a resonance with the highly intelligent, introverted character with what they consider to be puppy-like emotions. They are the first out non-binary actor in Star Trek, and Adira is Star Trek's first non-binary character.

Del Barrio told Nick Adams of GLAAD in 2020:

When I got the call that I'd been cast as Adira, I hadn't yet told the majority of my friends and family that I was non-binary. I had only recently discovered the word and realized that it described how I'd felt for a long time. I knew I wanted to tell my friends and family, so when this happened, it felt like the universe saying "go ahead." So in a way, Adira's story ends up mirroring mine. Just after I told people in my life, so did Adira. Definitely not the most common coming out story, but it was scary, special, and life changing (as they usually are).

Speaking with Adam B. Vary for Variety in 2020, Discovery co-showrunners Alex Kurtzman and Michelle Paradise explained that they felt a responsibility to bring trans and non-binary character stories into the show, and that casting del Barrio in the role was an easy choice, even shaping the character of Adira to fit who they called an extraordinary person.

== Public image ==
Del Barrio is an advocate for the rights of transgender people, and has named Lachlan Watson, Indya Moore, Bex Taylor-Klaus, Theo Germaine, Asia Kate Dillon, and Jack Haven as non-binary role models for their career. They have expressed a desire to work with Tim Burton, as well as on smaller budget independent films.

Upon joining the cast of Discovery with fellow actor Ian Alexander, del Barrio has related to having felt overwhelmed, in part due to feeling impostor syndrome, believing someone with more experience should have the role, and has expressed thankfulness for Alexander's presence and support. Alexander, who originally auditioned for the role of Adira, plays Adira's lover the Trill Gray Tal. Alexander and del Barrio worked with Nick Adams, director of transgender representation at GLAAD, to portray their characters' gender identities.

== Personal life ==
Del Barrio is bilingual, speaking both Spanish and English to a native standard, and is a skilled paddleboarder.

They have referred to themself as an introverted nerd who likes being alone, loves watching movies, video games, photography and playing Dungeons & Dragons (DnD) with friends. Cast members of Star Trek: Discovery, including del Barrio and the regular Noah Averbach-Katz (the dungeon master), Anthony Rapp and Ian Alexander, and guests including Mary Wiseman, Emily Coutts and Rapp's fiancé Ken Ithiphol, started playing DnD together during the filming of the fourth season of Discovery and, by request, stream their sessions as Disco Does DnD via Twitch.

== Filmography ==
=== Stage ===
- Duchess of Malfi, The Duchess – company: LAMDA; director: Rodney Cottier
- Hippolytus, Artemis – company: LAMDA; director: John Baxter
- Kin, Rachel – company: LAMDA; director: Gretchen Egolf
- Natasha, Pierre & The Great Comet of 1812, Hélène Bezukhova – company: LAMDA; director: Louise Shephard
- The Man of Mode, Mrs. Loveit – company: LAMDA; director: Beth Vyse
- The White Devil, Vittoria – company: LAMDA; director: Rodney Cottier
- The Winter's Tale, Paulina/Shepherd – company: LAMDA; director: Phillip Edgerly
- Three Days in the Country, Natasha Ivanovna – company: LAMDA; director: Mary Papadima
- Three Sisters, Irina – company: LAMDA; director: Caroline Leslie
- Otis & Eunice (2019), Duke – a retelling of Orpheus and Eurydice created by Sharon Clark, featuring actors from multiple stage schools performing simultaneously at two locations, with audiences at each being able to watch the other via video streaming; directors: Mabel Aitken, Ian Morgan and AJ Quinn

=== Film ===
- In the Service of the Queen (2019), Yaris – short film
- The Listener (2022), Jinx
- Trap House (2026)

=== Television ===
- Star Trek: Discovery (2020–2024), Adira Tal – recurring role (season 3); series regular (seasons 4 and 5)
- The Ready Room (2020–2024), themself
- The Owl House (2022), Raine Whispers (teenaged) – animated series; voice actor; Disney's first non-binary character
- Primos (2024), Alex – animated series; voice actor
- Max & the Midknights (2024–2026), Max – animated series; voice actor

=== Video games ===
- Grand Theft Auto VI (2026), The Local Population

=== Web ===
- Dirty Laundry, Season 1, Episode 5, "Who Hid $20,000 Inside a Bowflex?"
