= Hugh Culber =

Fictional character from Star Trek: Discovery

- Star Trek character
- First appearance: "Context Is for Kings" (2017)
- Created by: Bryan Fuller, Gretchen J. Berg, & Aaron Harberts
- Portrayed by: Wilson Cruz

In-universe information
- Species: Human
- Gender: Male
- Occupation: Physician
- Significant other: Paul Stamets
- Planet: Earth
- Affiliation: United Federation of Planets; Starfleet; USS Discovery

Hugh Culber is a fictional character in the Star Trek franchise, appearing in the television series Star Trek: Discovery. Culber is portrayed by actor Wilson Cruz. Originally introduced as a recurring character in the first season of the series, Culber is promoted to a main character in the second season. Within Discovery's narrative, he is the ship's senior medical doctor and partner to its engineer Paul Stamets (Anthony Rapp), making them the first openly gay couple portrayed in the franchise.

== Concept and casting ==
In July 2016, Wilson Cruz was cast as Culber, Paul Stamets' love interest, after having previously worked with Anthony Rapp on the musical Rent. Cruz was revealed to be reprising his role of Culber for the series' second season, as well as being promoted to the main cast, on July 23, 2018. The character's appearance in the third season was confirmed in October 2019, a year before its premiere. In October 2020, just prior to the third season's premiere, Culber's role in the fourth season was confirmed, when it was announced that the series was renewed.

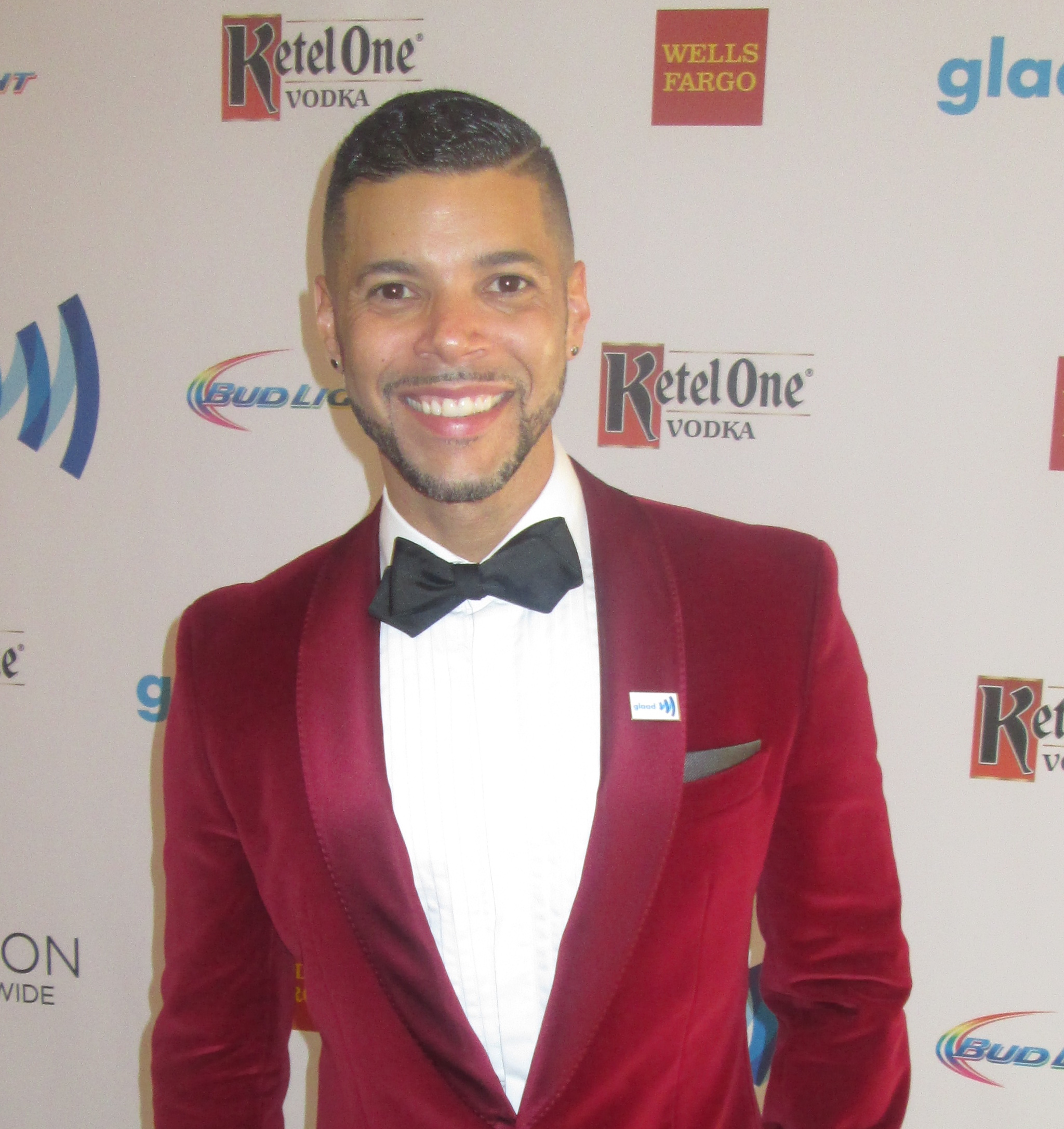
Wilson Cruz portrays Hugh Culber

== Characterization ==
About the character in an interview about being promoted to the main cast in season two with Anthony Rapp, Cruz said: "this season for this couple [Culber and Stamets] is really about deepening them individually. We get to find out a lot about Culber–who he is, what he wants, what makes him tick, what his ambitions are–separate and apart from this relationship. But we get to learn a lot about this relationship and it is put through the test." Cruz also confirmed that the reason he was only in the recurring cast because he was in 13 Reasons Why at the same time.

Culber is one-half of the first openly gay regular character couple in a Star Trek television series. On creating the first gay couple in a Star Trek series, Cruz said he "felt like it was a long time coming ... What's great about the way that the show is handling it is it's not like we are having a special two-hour episode about gay relationships in space. It's not that. They just happen to be in love, and they happen to be coworkers. And, I hope by the time we get to [the 23rd] century that it will be exactly like that."

In the season three episode "Su'Kal", Culber appears as a member of the Bajoran alien race briefly in a hologram simulation.

Talking toward the fourth season, Michelle Paradise noted that Stamets and Culber would form a "really lovely" family unit with the non-binary Adira Tal, who was introduced in the previous season, and their transgender boyfriend Gray.

== Fictional biography ==
In the first season, Culber treats Ash Tyler, who is struggling to contain his alternate Klingon personality, but is later killed by his patient. In the second-season episode "Saints of Imperfection," Stamets travels into the mycelium to find a copy of Culber, and brings him back to life.

== Reception ==
Various publications described how the character set a precedent in both the Star Trek world and generally in media as a depiction of a gay character. In 2019, Hugh Culber was ranked the 10th-sexiest Star Trek character by Syfy.
