= Wilson Cruz =

American actor

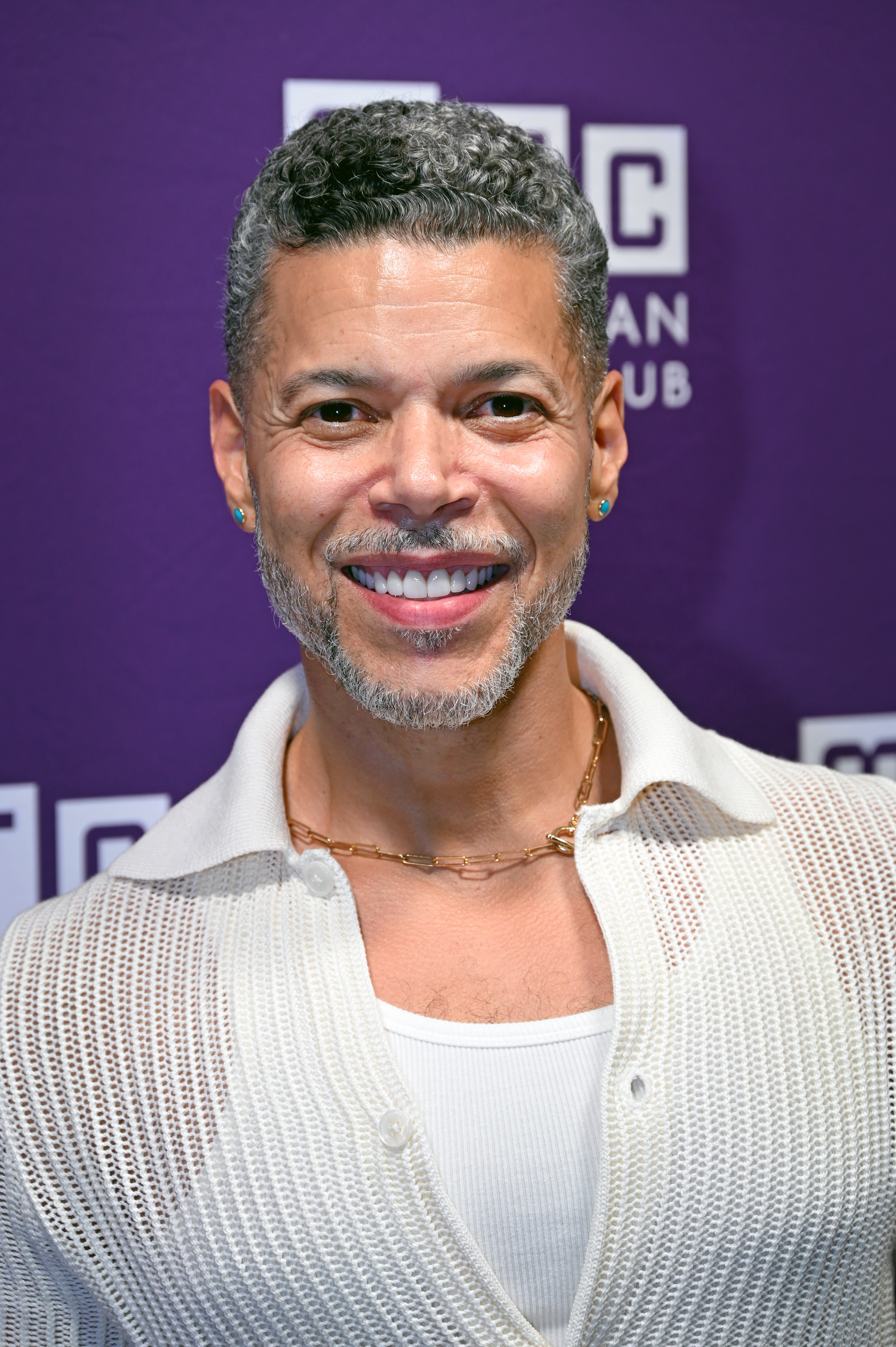
- Cruz in 2026
- Born: Wilson Echevarría; December 27, 1973 (age 52); Brooklyn, New York, U.S.
- Occupations: Actor, producer, activist, singer
- Years active: 1994–present

Wilson Cruz (born Wilson Echevarría; December 27, 1973)is an American actor known for playing Rickie Vasquez on My So-Called Life, Dr. Hugh Culber on Star Trek: Discovery, and the recurring character Junito on Noah's Arc. As a gay man of Afro-Puerto Rican ancestry, he has served as an advocate for gay youth, especially gay minorities.

== Early life ==
Cruz was born in Brooklyn, New York, to parents born in Puerto Rico. His family eventually moved to Rialto, California, where he attended Eisenhower High School, graduating in 1991. At age 19, Cruz came out to his parents as gay, first to his mother and then to his father. While his mother was initially hurt and shocked, she eventually accepted the news. His father, however, threw him out of the house, and Cruz spent the next few months living in his car and at the homes of friends. He later reconciled with his father.

== Career ==
Cruz went to Hollywood to seek work as an actor, intending to be open about his sexuality from the beginning of his career. In 1994, he was cast as Enrique "Rickie" Vasquez, a troubled, gay teen, in the short-lived, critically acclaimed cult classic TV series My So-Called Life. This made Cruz the first openly gay actor to play an openly gay character in a leading role in an American television series.

Following My So-Called Life's cancellation, Cruz went on to play J. Edgar Hoover's servant Joaquin in Oliver Stone's film Nixon and had a small role in the television movie On Seventh Avenue. In 1996, he appeared with David Arquette as Mikey in Johns, about the day-to-day struggles of male prostitutes. In 2000, he played Victor in the final season of Party of Five. He also had a recurring role as Rafael de la Cruz on the series, Raising the Bar.

Cruz's other acting credits include the films Joyride (1996), All Over Me (1997), Supernova (2000), Party Monster (2003), Margaret Cho's Bam Bam and Celeste (2005), Coffee Date (2007), and He's Just Not That Into You (2009); the television film The Perfect Pitch (2002); and guest appearances on the series Great Scott!, Sister, Sister, ER, Ally McBeal, The West Wing, Noah's Arc, and Grey's Anatomy. Cruz starred as Adrian in the film The Ode (2007), based on the novel Ode to Lata by Ghalib Shiraz Dhalla.

He also appeared/starred in the 2009 movie The People I've Slept With. He plays the best friend of a promiscuous woman who tries to find out who got her pregnant so that she can get married.

Cruz portrayed Dr. Hugh Culber on the science fiction series Star Trek: Discovery from 2017 to 2024.

Since 2020, Cruz has been a recurring guest on 25 Words or Less.

In 2023, Cruz became the new chair of the board of directors for GLSEN.

== Personal life ==
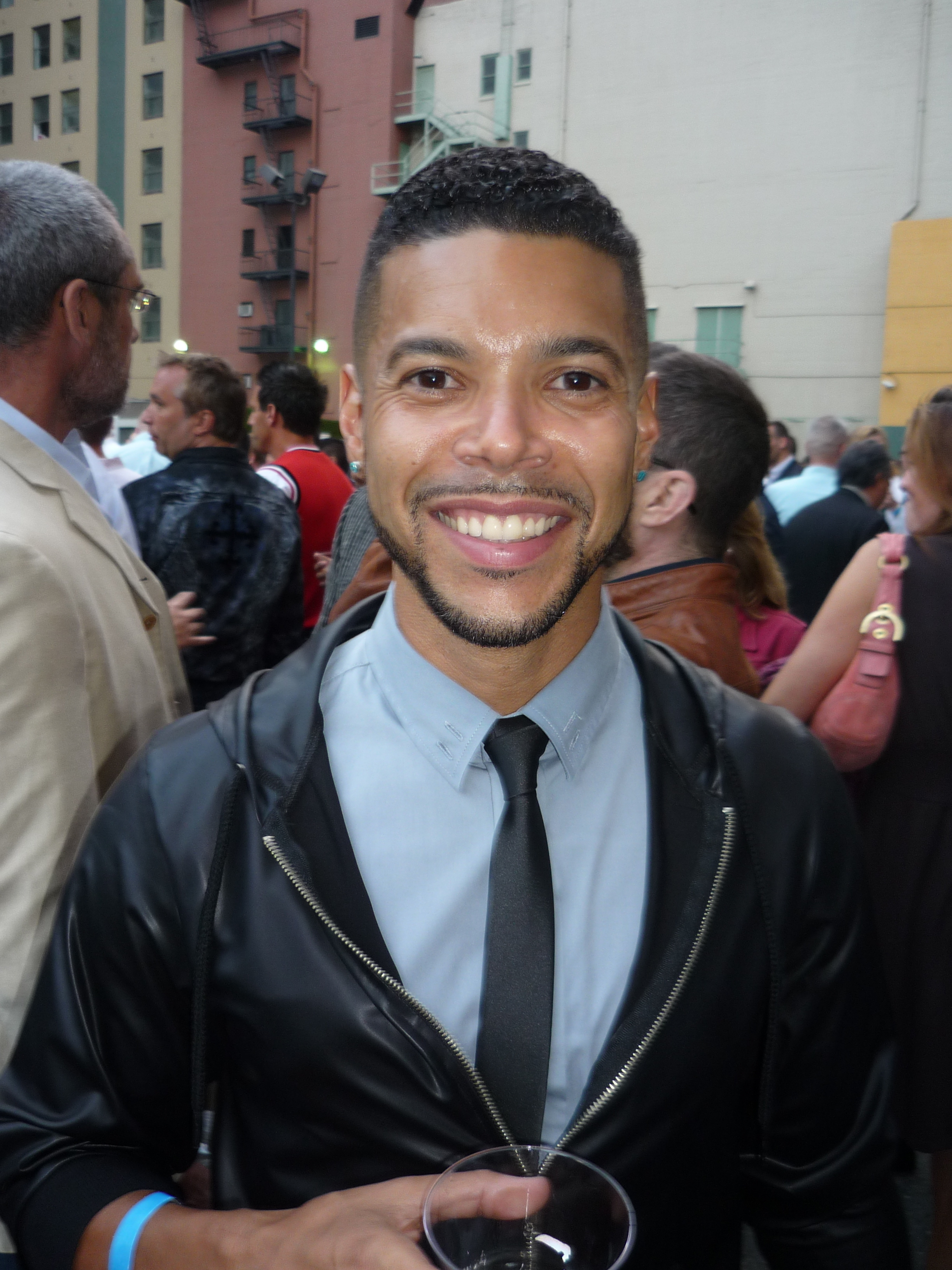
Cruz at Outfest 2010

Cruz works with and advocates on behalf of LGBTQ youth, especially youth of color. He has volunteered his time as host for the Youth Zone, an online community at Gay.com for LGBT youth. He was the grand marshal of the 1998 West Hollywood Gay Pride parade, the 2005 Chicago Pride Parade and the 2019 Fierté Montréal Pride Parade in Québec. In 2008, he was the keynote speaker at the University of Illinois at Chicago's Lavender Graduation and Rainbow Banquet honoring graduating LGBT students.

Cruz joined the board of directors of GLAAD in 1997 to assist the organization through a leadership transition, and joined the staff of GLAAD in 2012 as a National Spokesperson and Strategic Giving Officer.

Cruz's maternal stepaunt Brenda Lee Marquez McCool was among the 49 victims killed in the 2016 Orlando nightclub shooting; Cruz stated that she was killed while protecting her son Isaiah, who survived the gunfire.

In 2020, Cruz was honored on one of the covers of Out magazine's annual Out100 issue, saying that Wilson "beautifully weaves his activism inside every aspect of his work".

On October 23, 2025, Cruz and Marti Gould Cummings received the Upstander Award from the Tyler Clementi Foundation during their 11th annual Upstander Legacy Celebration in New York.

== Filmography and stage ==
=== Television ===
Year	Title	Role	Notes
1994–1995	My So-Called Life	Enrique "Rickie" Vasquez	19 episodes
1996	On Seventh Avenue	Reuben Diaz	
1996	Sister, Sister	Bobby	Episode: "Double Double Date"
1997	Ally McBeal	Steven/Stephanie	1 episode
1999–2000	Party of Five	Victor	11 episodes
2002	ER	Jeffrey Cruz	1 episode
2004	The West Wing	Jack Sosa	2 episodes
2005	The Closer	Man in Bar	1 episode
2005–2006	Noah's Arc	Junito	7 episodes
2006	Monk	Smoking Technician	1 episode
2007	NCIS	Todd Ryder	1 episode
2007	Rick & Steve: The Happiest Gay Couple in All the World	Evan	2 seasons
2008–2009	Raising the Bar	Rafael de la Cruz	3 episodes
2009	Pushing Daisies	Sid Tango	1 episode, June 13, (US)
2010	Grey's Anatomy	Kyle	1 episode, December 2, (US)
2011	Single Ladies	Vincent	2 episodes, July 18, (US)
2012	The Finder	Jonni	2 episodes
2014–2015	Red Band Society	Kenji Gomez-Rejon	Recurring role
2016	Shameless	Bartender	1 episode
2016	Mistresses	Dante	2 episodes
2016	Heartbeat	Various	2 episodes
2017	EastSiders	Jerry	1 episode
2017–2019	13 Reasons Why	Dennis Vasquez	19 episodes
2017–2024	Star Trek: Discovery	Hugh Culber	Main cast
2019	The Bravest Knight	Prince Andrew	
2019	Trapped: The Alex Cooper Story	Paul C. Burke	Television film
2019–2023	The Casagrandes	Romeo (voice)	Recurring role
2020–present	25 Words or Less	Self	Recurring role
2023	Moon Girl and Devil Dinosaur	Mr. Calderon (voice)	Recurring role

=== Film ===
Year	Title	Role	Notes
1995	Nixon	Joaquin (Hoover's servant)	
1996	Beat the Bash	Kevin	
1996	Johns	Mikey	
1996	Joyride	James	
1997	All Over Me	Jesse	
2000	Supernova	Benj Sotomejor	
2003	Party Monster	Angel	
2005	Bam Bam and Celeste	Tony	
2006	Coffee Date	Kelly	
2008	The Ode	Adrian	
2009	He's Just Not That into You	Nathan	
2009	Green Flash	Kyle	
2009	The People I've Slept With	Gabriel	
2011	Convincing Clooney	Joaquin	
2012	The Skinny	The Doctor	
2017	After Louie	Mateo	
2024	Mother of the Bride	Scott	
2025	Noah's Arc: The Movie	Dr. Junito Vargas	

=== Stage ===
Year	Title	Role	Notes
1998	Rent	Angel	
2003	A Perfect Wedding	Julian	
2005	Tick, Tick... BOOM!	Michael	

== See also ==
- List of Afro-Latinos
- List of Puerto Ricans
