= Emily Coutts =

Canadian actress (born 1989)

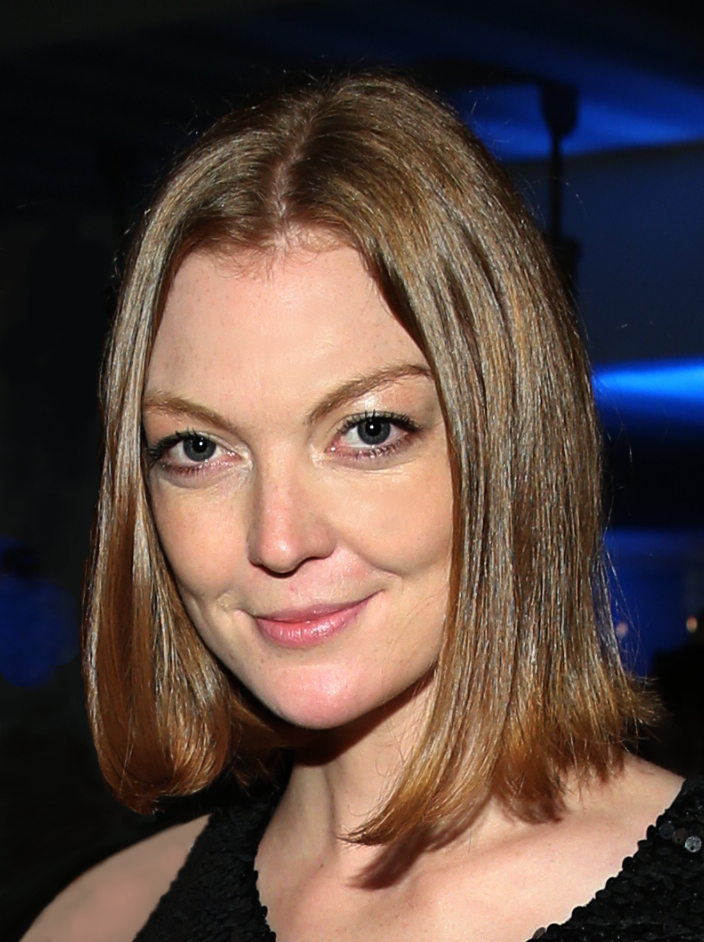
- Born: July 4, 1989 (age 37); Listowel, Ontario, Canada
- Occupations: Actor, writer, producer
- Notable work: Star Trek: Discovery

Emily Coutts (born July 4, 1989) is a Canadian actress. She is known for portraying Keyla Detmer, a bridge officer, on the Paramount+ series Star Trek: Discovery.

A graduate of York University's drama program, Coutts has written, produced, and starred in several independent short and feature films. She has also appeared in a web series that she co-wrote and co-produced, entitled Beattie & Mae, alongside Melanie Leishman.

== Personal life ==
Coutts came out as lesbian in 2019. In August 2020, she announced her engagement to her girlfriend, producer Lexy Altman.

== Filmography ==
=== Film ===
Year	Title	Role	Notes
2011	The Bright Side of the Moon	Anchor	
2015	Barn Wedding	Emma	Also producer and writer
2015	Crimson Peak	Eunice	
2015	As I Like Her	Liz	Short film
2015	Satisfaction	Kat	Short film
2016	Can't Close a Painted Eye	Maria	Short film
2016	3-Way (Not Calling)	Gina	Short film
2016	Cherry	Sam	Short film
2017	Come Back	Ella	Short film
2019	Barbara-Anne	Andi	Short film
2019	Goliath	Jenna	
2020	Eros	Caz	Short film
2020	Hazy Little Thing	Karen	
2020	Dear Jesus	Eileen	Short film; also producer, executive producer, and writer
2023	They Choose You	—N/a	Short film; director, producer, and writer

=== Television ===
Year	Title	Role	Notes
2012	The L.A. Complex	Paul F. Tompkins Show Receptionist	Episode: "Vacancy"
2012	Transporter: The Series	Cherisse	Episode: "Payback"
2013	The Next Step	Waitress	Episode: "Bad Moon Rising"
2013	Murdoch Mysteries	Typist	Episode: "The Ghost of Queen's Park "
2014	Best Christmas Party Ever	Natalie	TV movie
2016	The Girlfriend Experience	Monica	Episode: "Available"
2016	Dark Matter	Sylvia	Episode: "We Were Family"
2017	Murdoch Mysteries	Camilla Morse	Episode: "Hot Wheels of Thunder"
2017–2024	Star Trek: Discovery	Keyla Detmer	Recurring
2018	Designated Survivor	Kaitlin Corday	Episode: "Bad Reception"
2021	Star Trek: Discovery Logs	Keyla Detmer (voice)	TV series short
2021	Clarice	Erin	Episodes: "Silence Is Purgatory" & "Motherless Child"
2021	Glowbies	Fifi (voice)	Animated series
