= Paul Stamets (Star Trek) =

Character in the Star Trek franchise

- Star Trek character
- First appearance: "Context Is for Kings" (2017)
- Created by: Bryan Fuller; Gretchen J. Berg; Aaron Harberts
- Portrayed by: Anthony Rapp

In-universe information
- Species: Human
- Gender: Male
- Occupation: Astromycologist, Commander
- Affiliation: United Federation of Planets; Starfleet; USS Discovery
- Significant other: Hugh Culber
- Planet: Earth

Paul Stamets is a character in the fictional Star Trek franchise. He appears in the television series Star Trek: Discovery. Stamets is portrayed by actor Anthony Rapp. The character is one half of the first openly gay regular-character couple in a Star Trek television series. He is a scientist and engineer who combines physics and mycology into a fictional method for instantaneous faster than light travel. The character is named after the mycologist Paul Stamets.

== Concept and casting ==
Rapp was revealed to have been cast as Stamets in November 2016. He was originally cast in a different, smaller role, but when discussing gay actors who could portray the character Stamets, the executive producers realized that Rapp was the actor they wanted to fill that role instead. He did not audition for either role. On April 11, 2018, Rapp was revealed to be reprising his role for the series' second season. In October 2019, Stamet's appearances in the third season were confirmed. A year later, along with the announcement of the fourth season, Rapp was revealed to continue to be reprising his role.

== Characterization ==
Stamets and Culber are jointly the first openly gay characters in a Star Trek series, and the showrunners "wanted to roll out that character's sexuality the way people would roll out their sexuality in life". Rapp noted that Hikaru Sulu was portrayed as gay in the film Star Trek Beyond, calling that "a nice nod. But in this case, we actually get to see me with my partner in conversation, in our living quarters, you get to see our relationship over time, treated as any other relationship would be treated".

In the series, Stamets often talks about mushrooms in space. Stamets later develops real world contemporary mycological science into science fiction concepts in the portrayal. Stamets believes the universe is organized by spores and mycelia as the "building blocks of energy across the universe". The Stamets character was inspired by a real-life mycologist of the same name, whom Fuller had introduced to the series' writers early on after becoming interested in his research into spores. The character's outlook that physics and biology are quantifiably the same thing also comes from the real Stamets's research and theories.

== Reception ==
Various publications described how the character set a precedent in both the Star Trek world and generally in media as a depiction of a gay character.
