= Spore drive =

Fictional propulsion system

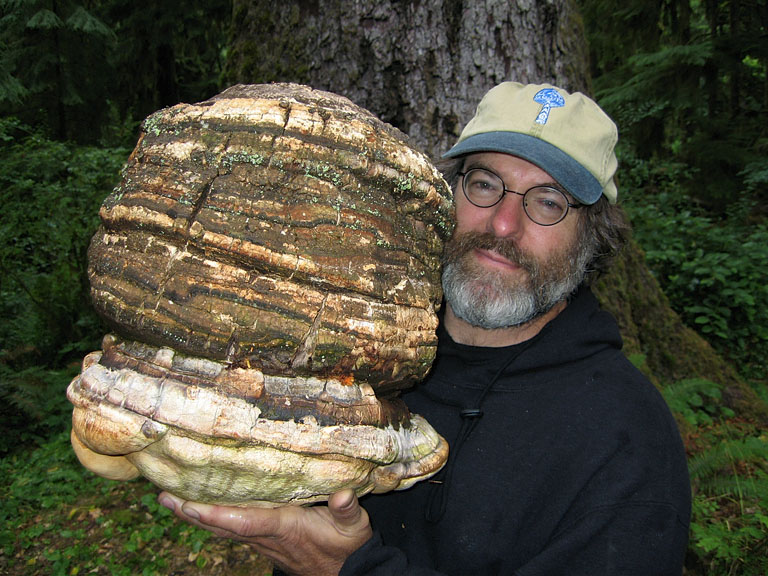
Mycologist Paul Stamets holding Laricifomes officinalis

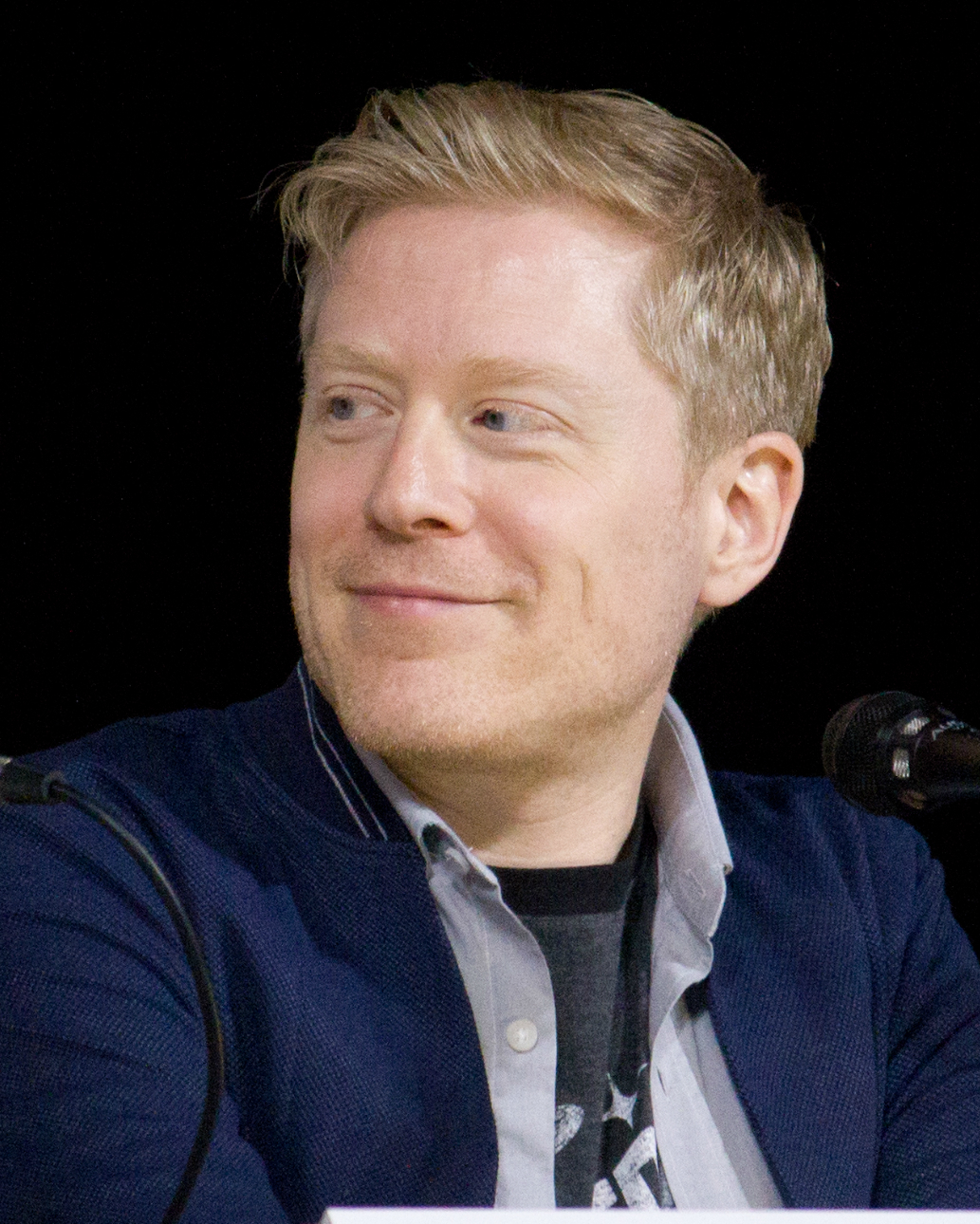
Anthony Rapp, who portrays astromycologist Paul Stamets, inspired by the real Stamets

The spore drive, formally known as the displacement-activated spore hub drive, is a fictional spacecraft propulsion system introduced in the 2017 television series Star Trek: Discovery. It enables instantaneous travel across interstellar and interdimensional space via a subspace network of fungal spores produced by a space-dwelling organism, Prototaxites stellaviatori. This network is depicted as existing simultaneously across all points in space and time, allowing starships to transition between locations or parallel universes without traversing intervening space.

In contrast to conventional Star Trek propulsion technologies such as impulse drive and warp drive, the spore drive relies on biologically mediated navigation via a "mycelial network", depicted as a separate space outside of normal reality. It is presented as a classified project developed by Starfleet Intelligence and tested aboard the USS Discovery, but ultimately withheld from broader implementation due to ethical, biological, and strategic constraints.

Inspired in part by the work of real-world mycologist Paul Stamets, the spore drive has been analyzed by scholars as a representation of posthuman connectivity, ecological interdependence, and speculative theoretical physics, with conceptual roots in mycology and environmental allegory.

== Background ==
Within Star Trek, a variety of spacecraft propulsion systems have been depicted. The most common are the impulse drive and the warp drive, the propulsion method most closely associated with the franchise. Other depicted faster-than-light travel methods were typically unique, such as a single traversable wormhole in Star Trek: Deep Space Nine, or exotic technologies unavailable for routine usage by characters.

The impulse drives, generally depicted as being fusion powered standard thrust engines, can propel a ship to a maximum of one quarter the speed of light at full power. The impulse system avoids issues with relativistic mechanics in Star Trek through some of its design aspects. The warp drive is Star Trek's main fictional faster-than-light method of travel. Reminiscent of the speculative Alcubierre drive, a warp drive allows a ship to achieve faster-than-light travel through direct manipulation of space around the craft. Both create a "warp bubble" that moves space around a vessel, rather than the vessel moving through space.

Star Trek: Discovery's spore drive was presented as the third major form of spacecraft propulsion, and an in-universe scientific breakthrough, considered on par with the earliest discovery of warp travel itself. The spore drive is depicted as the only Star Trek propulsion system that is both reliable and instant. The Crossfield-class USS Discovery is equipped to manage hundreds of concurrent science projects at top clearance level and is explicitly described as conducting black ops research for Starfleet Intelligence, with the spore drive as its most classified and central endeavor. The Crossfield ships were designed from the outset to house the spore drive system and to serve as test platforms for top-secret astromycological research. The science of the spore drive is based on theories of fictional astromycologist and Starfleet officer Paul Stamets. The in-universe science states that at the quantum level, biology and physics are one and the same. A space-based fungus named Prototaxites stellaviatori is discovered that exists both within normal spacetime and extra dimensions, which Stamets calls the "veins and muscles" of the galaxy, and is a possible progenitor of panspermia.

== Depiction ==
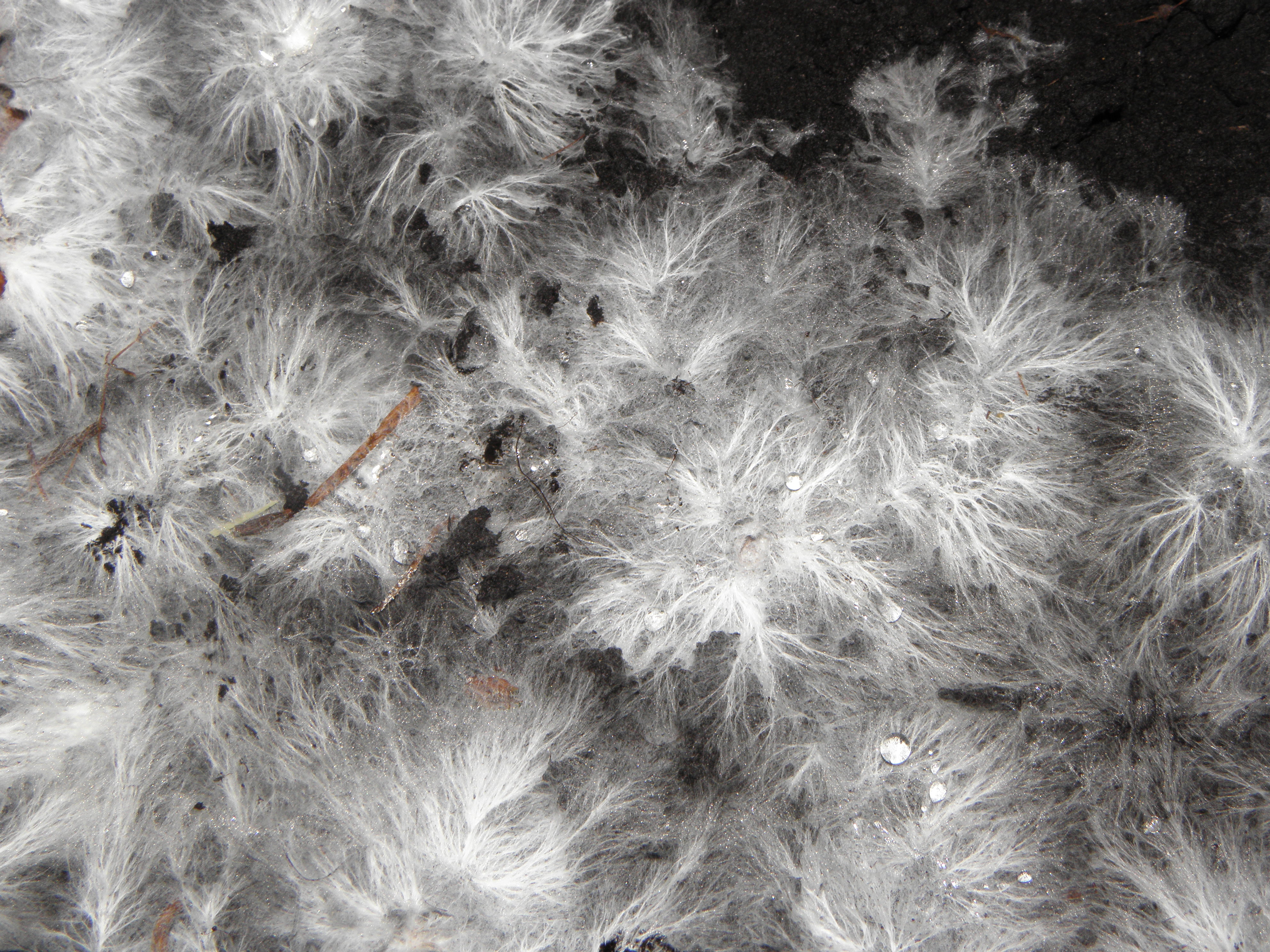
Agaricus bisporus, a common white mushroom, and its mycelium, visually similar to the branching paths of the mycelial network.

Beginning ten years before the events of Star Trek: The Original Series, the spore drive and Discovery are first presented as unreliable experimental technologies, though Discovery with the assistance of Stamets and the spore drive later help to avert various crises throughout the series. During the Star Trek: Discovery series, characters are told how the spore drive works when first experiencing it. In the Star Trek: Discovery season 2 episode "New Eden", captain Christopher Pike summarized it as:

If you're telling me that this ship can skip across the universe on a highway made of mushrooms, I kind of have to go on faith.

When controlled by an appropriate navigator, a specially designed starship—such as the USS Discovery—could enter into the "mycelial network", which is composed entirely of P. stellaviatori, emerging instantly anywhere else, regardless of distance. The mycelial network reached any location in all universes, including Star Trek's Mirror Universe, fueled by spores of the fungus. The mycelial network appears as a web-like thread of fibers. According to mycologist Lynne Boddy, the mycelial network visually echoes real-life underground mycorrhizal networks, albeit on a galactic scale.

To navigate a spore drive requires "seeing" the connections of the network in ways even future computers cannot handle. Initially, Starfleet is unable to safely use the spore drive for long-range travel, being limited to short jumps. The sister ship of the Discovery, the USS Glenn, is destroyed when first attempting a longer jump due to unproven navigation. Later, Discovery encounters an alien creature visually similar to a large Earth tardigrade, with a natural ability to navigate the mycelial network. Stamets integrates the creature's DNA into himself—similarly to horizontal gene transfer—and gains the same ability, allowing him to safely jump Discovery to any point in the galaxy. Spore jumps were signified by the ship's commander calling for a "black alert", similar to Star Trek's "red alert". Discovery's saucer body spins during the spore drive activation, as "rings surrounding the ship's saucer ... begin to rotate as the ship 'spore jumps'."

Within the Star Trek franchise, after the events of season 2, the Discovery is removed from its then-current year of 2259, time traveling forward irrevocably to the year 3188 for seasons 3-5 and the rest of the Star Trek: Discovery series. In the final scenes set in the 23rd century, the Discovery and spore drive projects are left heavily classified, with only a handful of living people with knowledge of the ship's true fate until Discovery's arrival in the 32nd century. The in-universe history recorded Discovery lost with all hands as the Glenn was, explaining why the convenience of the spore drive was not a factor in Star Trek stories outside of Star Trek: Discovery. By the end of Star Trek: Discovery in the far future, the United Federation of Planets learns members of a sentient alien species are able to navigate the spore drive, allowing Stamets to at last retire with Discovery remaining in service. Starfleet is ultimately unable to replicate Discovery's technology outside of her unique circumstances, leaving it the only known spore drive starship as of the 42nd century, two millennia after she first jumped.

== Design and production ==
A "black alert" spore jump sequence from Star Trek: Discovery, incorporating Ralph McQuarrie's unused designs for Planet of the Titans. The lighting, set transitions, and visual effects are discussed in the design and production section.

Aaron Harberts, Star Trek: Discovery's then-showrunner, discussed the origins of the spore drive with Reactor Magazine in 2018. Real-world mycologist Paul Stamets and his sixth book Mycelium Running were cited as a particular influence, which examined concepts of fungus-based bioremediation, called mycoremediation.

During early pre-production, co-creator Bryan Fuller asked the art team to make the ship itself "explain" its exotic propulsion. Production designers Mark Worthington and Todd Cherniawsky therefore revived Ralph McQuarrie's never-used double-disc Enterprise concept from Planet of the Titans:

We have two discs, an outer ring and the inner saucer section... it became the visual expression of the new drive system. That saucer pivots whenever the drive system is engaged.

Bringing the "jump" to life required a hybrid of practical and digital effects. On set, more than 500 individually wired LEDs and a DMX network allowed the production team to trigger the teal-and-black lighting cue that signals "black alert". Computer-generated imagery animators later added the ring-spin and flash in post-production. Graphics lead Tim Peel noted that up to twenty layers of practical screens run simultaneously on the bridge so that actors are "really inside the effect," reducing the amount of compositing needed during each jump sequence. Set designer Matt Morgan added that the underslung bridge and surrounding ring forced builders to raise the entire room twelve feet above the stage floor, allowing cameras to track the saucer's rotation.

The spore drive was first introduced in Star Trek: Discovery's fourth episode of the first season, "The Butcher's Knife Cares Not for the Lamb's Cry", in 2017. Harberts acknowledged that the writers would need to address why such a powerful propulsion system disappears from later canon, noting that the entire program might be "classified" by Starfleet—which is exactly what happened.

== Sciences ==
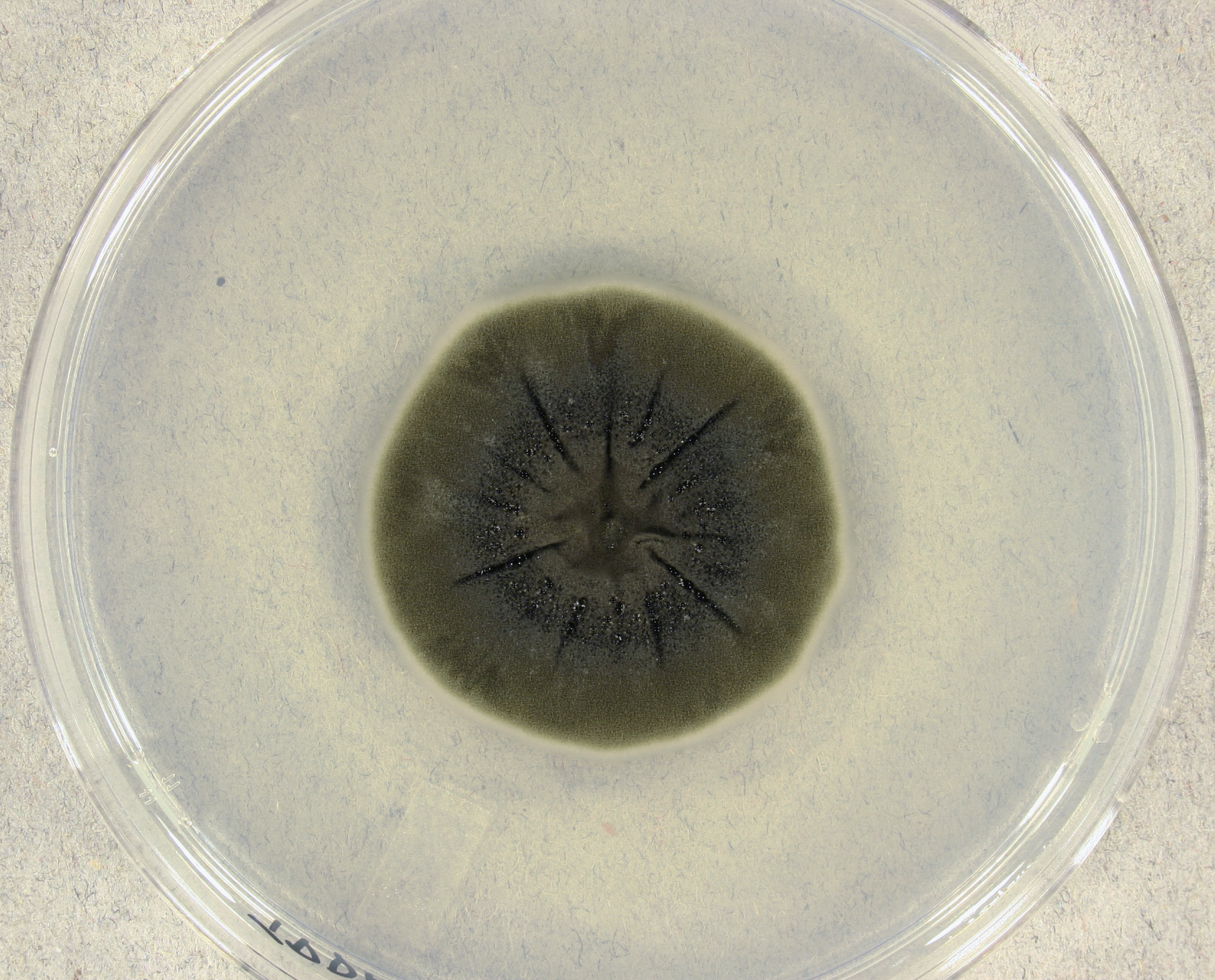
Cladosporium sphaerospermum, a radiotrophic fungus first described in 1886.

Writing in Reactor, Jonathan Alexandratos explores overlaps between the works of both the real-life and fictional Stamets, particularly how mycoremediation concepts are integral to the story mechanics of the mycelial network and factor into the story in several season 2 episodes of Star Trek: Discovery. Alexandratos also raises the concept of using the mycelium to terraform a planet, which Doug Bonderud similarly highlights in an article for aerospace manufacturer Northrop Grumman. He further discusses the implications of the network drawing life into itself, spreading it elsewhere, and its potential to heal or repair harm. The last is seen in similar real-life sciences, such as radiotrophic fungus in the wake of the Chernobyl disaster.

Ethan Siegel, an astrophysicist writing for Forbes, examined the theoretical plausibility of the spore drive using concepts from modern physics. He proposed that the drive's effect could be explained by invoking a fourth spatial dimension—allowing a ship to leave three-dimensional space, travel a short distance in this higher dimension, and reenter elsewhere nearly instantaneously. He framed this mechanism as analogous to treating "subspace" in the franchise as a hidden extra dimension, thus giving the spore network a semi-credible scientific analog. However, Siegel was also critical of the series' decision to base such advanced mechanics on a biological mechanism, noting it would have been more plausible had it involved exotic particles or energy fields.

Evelyn Koch of the University of Marburg analyzes the spore drive narrative in Star Trek: Discovery as presenting the tardigrade's forced role as a navigator as an ethically troubling form of symbiosis, the effects of Stamets's DNA modification as leading to a partial upload of his consciousness into the network, and the mycelial network itself as a morally unclassifiable, alien intelligence that resists human-centered interpretation.

Steven Salzberg, a computational biologist, was dismissive of the spore drive concept, calling it "laughably ridiculous" compared to the merely "physically implausible" warp drive. Salzberg was also critical of the plotline where Stamets obtained mycelial network navigation abilities from space tardigrade DNA via horizontal gene transfer. The likely origin of the tardigrade DNA story, Salzberg theorized, was a controversial 2015 scientific publication that claimed real tardigrades could absorb foreign DNA into themselves, which was disproven afterward in the same journal. The tardigrade DNA in question was reported to be only contaminated specimens.

Cornell University media scholar Karen Pinkus argues that the spore drive embodies a fantasy of ecological redemption, free from the compromises of real-world energy transitions. She notes that, unlike current biofuels, the spores in Discovery "don't emit any byproducts, harmful or otherwise" and "are not used up in combustion," describing the system as "a nice immersive fantasy" offering escapism from "unbearable realities today." Pinkus critiques the spore drive as a speculative fuel fantasy that risks reinforcing complacency in the face of climate crisis. She warns that it may serve as "a narrative of progress" allowing viewers to "defer now, in the present, any radical shifts in how we produce and consume energy," echoing what she calls "the tyranny of common sense" surrounding future fuels.

== Reception ==
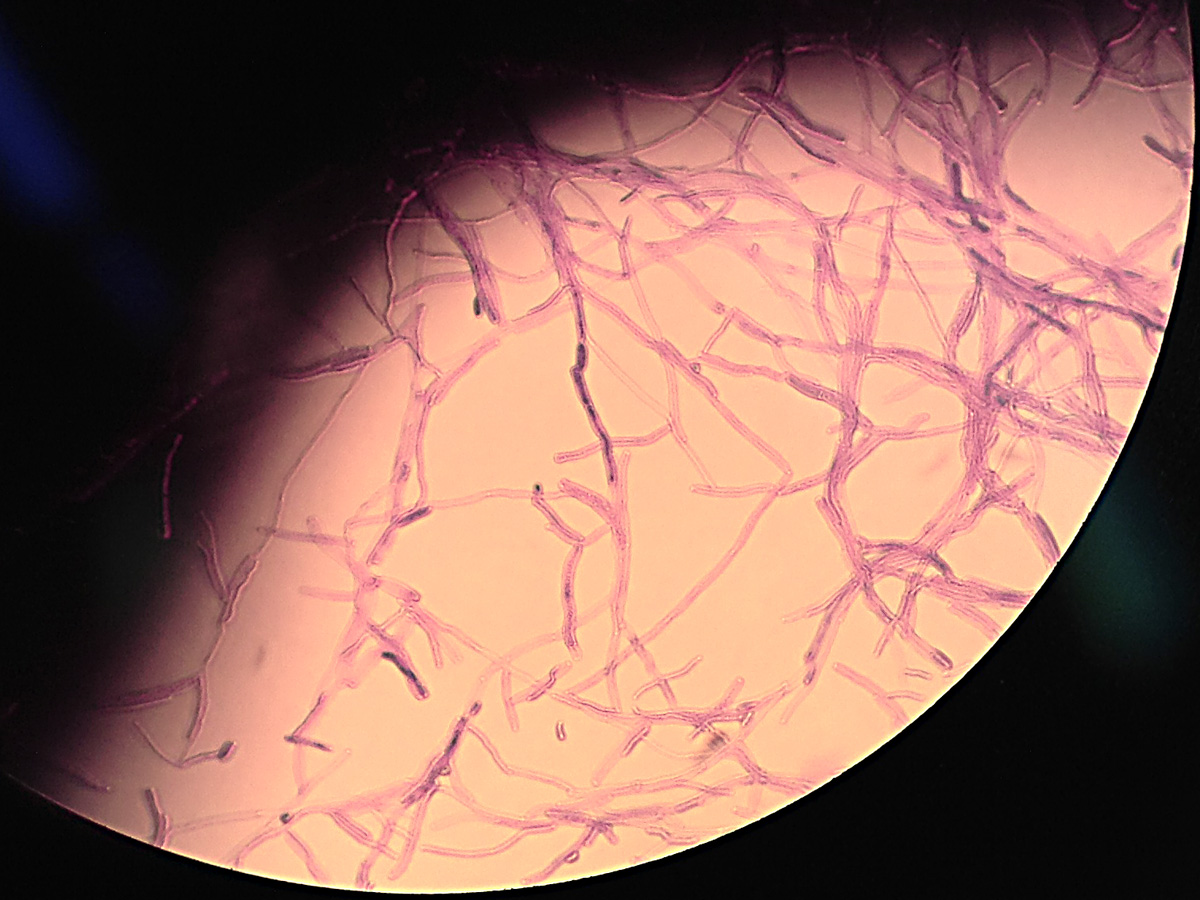
Yarrowia lipolytica, a fungus associated with necrobiomes and mycoremediation of decomposing organisms, which Stanway compared to the mycelial network in Star Trek. The fictional network recycles matter and creates life, as seen in "Saints of Imperfection" (Discovery S2E5). Dried and heat-killed Y. lipolytica yeast is recognized as a safe novel food by the European Food Safety Authority.

Bettina Wurche, in a ScienceBlogs article on mycology in Star Trek: Discovery, compared the Discovery's spore-drive navigator to the mutated Navigators of the Spacing Guild in Frank Herbert's Dune series, who "[fold] space" using the spice melange. Herbert's 1965 novel describes melange as originating from a "fungusoid wild growth." Other organic faster-than-light systems depicted in fiction include living ships called Leviathans in the Farscape franchise and Star Trek creator Gene Roddenberry's television series Andromeda, whose "slipstream" drive also required an organic navigator, like the spore drive.

Lisa Meinecke in Fighting for the Future: Essays on Star Trek: Discovery interprets Star Trek: Discovery's spore drive arc as a critique of liberal humanism, arguing that the series displaces Star Trek's historical emphasis on autonomous individualism with a vision rooted in posthuman connectivity. She highlights the shift away from human-centered rationality toward an ecological pluralism, in which the mycelial network symbolizes interdependence rather than progress through hierarchy. In this framework, Stamets' fusion with the spore drive marks a narrative break from the franchise's tradition of "enlightened humanism," positioning his transformation as a political gesture toward relational ethics.

The University of Warwick's Elizabeth Stanway situates Star Trek: Discovery within a science fiction tradition of depicting collective, sentient ecosystems. She discusses the mycelial-based entities in Sheri S. Tepper's Raising the Stones (1990), which develop "as a mycelial network which feeds (initially) on a dead human being," eventually guiding inhabitants on "some instinctual, subconscious level." Stanway notes fears within the story of "the corruption of free will and the threat to their self-determination." She observes that similar ideas of a planetary biological network appear in Avatar (2009) and its sequel, where characters interact with the biosphere via symbiotic neural connections to the goddess-like entity Eywa. Alexandratos, writing in Reactor, frames the mycelial network as a "narrative agent" that is not only alive but capable of both ecological destruction and resurrection, paralleling themes of sentient omniscience. He notes the narrative risk of Stamets becoming "too powerful" through his connection to the network, raising questions about power, agency, and narrative control.

Meinecke identifies Stamets' transformation through the spore drive as an enactment of posthuman becoming, contrasting it with the franchise's prior depiction of android identity in Star Trek: The Next Generation. Where Data sought to approximate humanness as an ideal, Stamets' evolution rejects autonomy in favor of entanglement with nonhuman life. According to Meinecke, Stamets becomes a "partial subject" in a shared, open-ended network—his identity redefined by affective ties to the tardigrade, his spouse Hugh Culber, and the mycelium itself. In doing so, Discovery reframes identity as contingent, collective, and nonhierarchical. Star Trek: Discovery reimagines the rhizomatic potential first glimpsed in the Borg—but purges it of authoritarian sameness in favor of posthuman hybridity. According to Meinecke, unlike the Borg collective, which neutralizes difference, the mycelial network fosters egalitarian entanglement and ethical co-agency. In this view, Stamets does not merely interface with alien technology—he enters into a reciprocal bond that models a new ontological vision rooted in sustainability, relationality, and pluralism.

== Themes ==
The spore drive is depicted as a "complex cybernetic multispecies assemblage," with the starship Discovery linked to the mycelial network via the tardigrade interface. This integration allows the ship "access to the multiplicities of possible pathways across the universe, to an infinite number of possible entrances." Stamets' use of the drive initiates a process of "becoming-with the tardigrade and the mycelium," one that is described as "continuous and transformative."

As Stamets becomes "integrated into the drive system," he "steps apart from Discovery and allies himself to the mycelium and the tardigrade." In this "liminal position between the ship and the network," he gains "the ability to cross these boundaries and gain access to new pathways." Stamets "takes on the tardigrade's position in the drive system and thus the ability to navigate through and thus communicate with the network." His "mind and, in fact, his body are quite literally opened to another plane of existence." The transformation initially manifests as "a state of somewhat uncharacteristic euphoria and affection towards his friends and colleagues; after all, Stamets just connected to all living things in a profoundly spiritual, transcendent experience (1x07)."

Later, "navigating the regenerating rhizome almost causes him to lose his way," but he stabilizes through his relationship with Culber and the recurring metaphor of the "'clearing in the forest' (1x13)." The mycelial network is explicitly called "a multispecies rhizome, entangling and empowering all life," while the spore drive itself is described as "an extremely powerful transhumanist cybernetic biotechnology at the interface to this network."

The narrative is framed in ethical terms through comparison to a prior Star Trek: Voyager storyline. The show's use of the tardigrade echoes Voyager's two-part episode "Equinox" (5x26, 6x01), in which another Starfleet crew exploits alien lifeforms to fuel their ship. The authors note that "Saru's decision to employ the tardigrade as navigator is motivated by a similarly existential anxiety." However, they contrast Saru's approach with that of Captain Kathryn Janeway, who "tries everything in her power to curtail further use of the aliens for fuel" in accordance with Federation ethics.

== See also ==
- Mycorestoration – fungal-based environmental restoration.
- Mycorrhizal bioremediation – using symbiotic fungi to detoxify ecosystems.
- Technology in Star Trek#Subspace – Star Trek's core faster-than-light communication and travel medium.
