= Nylon-eating bacteria and creationism =

Religious application of the existence of microorganisms that break down nylon

The discovery of nylon-eating bacteria has been used to refute creationist arguments against evolution and natural selection. These bacteria can produce novel enzymes that allow them to feed on by-products of nylon manufacture which did not exist prior to the invention of nylon in the 1930s. Observation of these adaptations refutes pseudoscientific claims that no new information can be added to a genome and that proteins are too complex to evolve through a process of mutation and natural selection. Apologists have produced reactionary literature attempting to deny that evolution occurs, in turn generating input from the scientific community.

== Evidence and education ==
There is scientific consensus that the capacity to synthesize nylonase most probably developed as a single-step mutation that survived because it improved the fitness of the bacteria possessing the mutation. This is seen as a good example of evolution through mutation and natural selection that has been observed as it occurs and could not have come about until the production of nylon by humans.

The discovery was first publicized by science education advocates like the National Center for Science Education, and New Mexicans for Science and Reason (NMSR) who stated that research refutes claims made by creationists and intelligent design proponents. The claims were that random mutation and natural selection could never add new information to a genome and that the odds against a useful new protein, such as an enzyme, arising through a process of random mutation would be prohibitively high.

Physicist Dave Thomas, the President of NMSR, noted that gene duplication and frame-shift mutations were powerful sources of random mutation. In particular, in response to comments by creationists such as Don Batten, NMSR has stated that it was these mutations that gave rise to nylonase, even if the genes were part of a plasmid as suggested by Batten.

== Apologetics ==
Proponents of creationism, such as Answers in Genesis and Creation Ministries International, have cited horticulturalist and apologist Don Batten, pointing out that scientific research showed that the genes involved were on a plasmid, and claiming that the phenomenon is evidence that plasmids in bacteria are a designed feature, intended to allow bacteria to adapt easily to new food sources or cope with toxic chemicals. Batten wrote:

It seems clear that plasmids are designed features of bacteria that enable adaptation to new food sources or the degradation of toxins. The details of just how they do this remain to be elucidated. The results so far clearly suggest that these adaptations did not come about by chance mutations, but by some designed mechanism.

However, NMSR pointed out that the gene duplication and frame-shift mutations that gave rise to nylonase were powerful sources of random mutation, whether or not the genes were part of a plasmid as suggested by Batten. A posting at TalkOrigins Archive by Ian Musgrave asserted that bacteria carry many genes in plasmids, particularly those involved in xenobiotic handling or metabolic functions. Musgrave added that in Pseudomonas, most of the xenobiotic degradation genes are on plasmids. Therefore it is entirely likely that a xenobiotic handling enzyme will arise from mutations of xenobiotic handling genes. The fact that these genes are on plasmids does not invalidate the fact that they exist, and exist only in two strains of bacteria. Musgrave also criticized Batten for mis-stating the conclusions of some of the authors of the scientific literature on nylon-eating bacteria.

MSNBC published an editorial from science writer Ker Than that stated that the evolution of the enzymes, known as nylonase, produced by nylon-eating bacteria was a compelling argument against the claim made by intelligent design proponents that specified complexity required an intelligent designer, since nylonase function was both specified and complex. Theologian and intelligent design proponent William Dembski posted a response that questioned whether the genetic changes that produced nylonase were complex enough to be considered a specified complexity. Biology professor Ken Miller said that intelligent design proponents claim that we can't see either design or evolution taking place. Therefore, according to the design proponents, intelligent design and evolution are both just matters of faith or world view. He added that however, the evolution of the enzyme nylonase, which scientists were able to repeat in the lab with another strain of bacteria, is one of a number of cases that show that evolution can be observed as it occurs.

== See also ==
- E. coli long-term evolution experiment – Scientific study
- Radiotrophic fungus – Fungus capable of radiosynthesis
