= 4-Methylaminobutanoate oxidase (methylamine-forming) =

Enzyme

4-methylaminobutanoate oxidase (methylamine-forming)

Identifiers
- EC no.: 1.5.3.21

Databases
- IntEnz: IntEnz view
- BRENDA: BRENDA entry
- ExPASy: NiceZyme view
- KEGG: KEGG entry
- MetaCyc: metabolic pathway
- PRIAM: profile
- PDB structures: RCSB PDB PDBe PDBsum
Search
- PMC: articles
- PubMed: articles
- NCBI: proteins

4-methylaminobutanoate oxidase (methylamine-forming) (EC 1.5.3.21, mao (gene)) is an enzyme with systematic name 4-methylaminobutanoate methylamidohydrolase. This enzyme catalyses the following chemical reaction

4-(methylamino)butyric acid
+ H_{2}O
O_{2}
H_{2}O_{2}
O_{2}
H_{2}O_{2}
succinic semialdehyde
+ H_{3}CNH_{2}

The enzyme participates in the nicotine degradation in soil bacterium Arthrobacter nicotinovorans. This bacterium also contains the enzyme 4-methylaminobutanoate oxidase (formaldehyde-forming), which gives γ-aminobutyric acid and formaldehyde as its products, rather than succinic semialdehyde and methylamine.
