= Nicotine blue oxidoreductase =

Class of enzymes

Identifiers
- EC no.: 1.1.1.328

Databases
- IntEnz: IntEnz view
- BRENDA: BRENDA entry
- ExPASy: NiceZyme view
- KEGG: KEGG entry
- MetaCyc: metabolic pathway
- PRIAM: profile
- PDB structures: RCSB PDB PDBe PDBsum
Search
- PMC: articles
- PubMed: articles
- NCBI: proteins

Nicotine blue oxidoreductase (EC 1.1.1.328, nboR (gene)) is an enzyme with systematic name 3,3'-bipyridine-2,2',5,5',6,6'-hexol:NADP^{+} 11-oxidoreductase. This enzyme catalyses the following chemical reaction

3,3'-bipyridine-2,2',5,5',6,6'-hexol
+ NAD^{+}
H^{+}
H^{+}
nicotine blue
+ NADH

The enzyme can use the alternative cofactor, nicotinamide adenine dinucleotide phosphate. It is extracted from the bacterium Arthrobacter nicotinovorans.
