= Nylon-eating bacteria =

Scientific classification
- Domain: Bacteria
- Kingdom: Bacillati
- Phylum: Actinomycetota
- Class: Actinomycetes
- Order: Micrococcales
- Family: Micrococcaceae
- Genus: Paenarthrobacter
- Species: P. ureafaciens
- Variety: P. u. var. KI72

Trinomial name
- Paenarthrobacter ureafaciens var. KI72 GTDB r95 & NCBI, 2020 (Busse HJ, 2016)

Synonyms
- Arthrobacter sp. KI72 Takehara I, 2017; Flavobacterium sp. KI72 Negoro S, 1980; Achromobacter guttatus KI72 Kinoshita S, 1975; (Due to an OCR error, the strain name has occasionally been reported as "K172".)

Species of bacteria

Paenarthrobacter ureafaciens KI72, popularly known as nylon-eating bacteria, is a strain of Paenarthrobacter ureafaciens that can digest certain by-products of nylon 6 manufacture. It uses a set of enzymes to digest nylon, popularly known as nylonase.

== Discovery and nomenclature ==
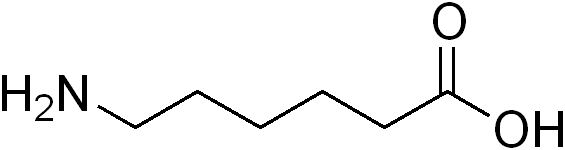
Chemical structure of 6-aminohexanoic acid

In 1975, a team of Japanese scientists discovered a strain of bacterium, living in ponds containing waste water from a nylon factory, that could digest certain byproducts of nylon 6 manufacture, such as the linear dimer of 6-aminohexanoate. These substances are not known to have existed before the invention of nylon in 1935. It was initially named as Achromobacter guttatus.

Studies in 1977 revealed that the three enzymes that the bacteria were using to digest the byproducts were significantly different from any other enzymes produced by any other bacteria, and not effective on any material other than the manmade nylon byproducts.

The bacterium was reassigned to Flavobacterium in 1980. Its genome was resolved in 2017, again reassigning it to Arthrobacter. The Genome Taxonomy Database considers it a strain of Paenarthrobacter ureafaciens following a 2016 reclassification. As of January 2021, the NCBI taxonomy browser has been updated to match GTDB.

=== Descendant strains ===
A few newer strains have been created by growing the original KI72 in different conditions, forcing it to adapt. These include KI722, KI723, KI723T1, KI725, KI725R, and many more.

== The enzymes ==
The bacterium contains the following three enzymes:

- 6-aminohexanoate-cyclic-dimer hydrolase (EI, NylA, P13398)
- 6-aminohexanoate-dimer hydrolase (EII, NylB, P07061)
- 6-aminohexanoate-oligomer endohydrolase (EIII, NylC, Q57326)

All three enzymes are encoded on a plasmid called pOAD2. The plasmid can be transferred to E. coli, as shown in a 1983 publication.

=== EI ===
The enzyme EI is related to amidases. Its structure was resolved in 2010.

=== EII ===
EII has evolved by gene duplication followed by base substitution of another protein EII'. Both enzymes have 345 identical aminoacids out of 392 aminoacids (88% homology). The enzymes are similar to beta-lactamase.

The EII' (NylB', P07062) protein is about 100x times less efficient compared to EII. A 2007 research by the Seiji Negoro team shows that just two amino-acid alterations to EII', i.e. G181D and H266N, raises its activity to 85% of EII.

=== EIII ===
The structure of EIII was resolved in 2018. Instead of being a completely novel enzyme, it appears to be a member of the N-terminal nucleophile (N-tn) hydrolase family. Specifically, computational approaches classify it as a MEROPS S58 (now renamed P1) hydrolase. The protein is expressed as a precursor, which then cleaves itself into two chains. Outside of this plasmid, > 95% similar proteins are found in Agromyces and Kocuria. As of 2025, 9 homologues of NylC are described from different Actinobacteria (Plastic Enzyme Database PAZY., accessed 12.02.2025).

EIII was originally thought to be completely novel. Susumu Ohno proposed that it had come about from the combination of a gene-duplication event with a frameshift mutation. An insertion of thymidine would turn an arginine-rich 427aa protein into this 392aa enzyme.

== Role in evolution teaching ==
There is scientific consensus that the capacity to synthesize nylonase most probably developed as a single-step mutation that survived because it improved the fitness of the bacteria possessing the mutation. More importantly, one of the enzymes involved was produced by a frame-shift mutation that completely scrambled transcribed amino acids. Despite this, the new gene still had a novel, albeit weak, catalytic capacity. This is seen as a good example of how mutations easily can provide the raw material for evolution by natural selection.

A 1995 paper showed that scientists have also been able to induce another species of bacterium, Pseudomonas aeruginosa, to evolve the capability to break down the same nylon byproducts in a laboratory by forcing them to live in an environment with no other source of nutrients.

== Engineered Nylon-eating bacteria ==
Integration of EI and EII into the genome of the bacterium Pseudomonas putida KT2440 enabled the development of a strain that can metabolize Nylon oligomers. Metabolism of common Nylon monomers like aminocaproic acid and hexamethylenediamine was realised by the deregulation of polyamine metabolism, guided by Adaptive laboratory evolution experiments with nylon components as sole source of nutrients. The adipic acid resulting from this metabolic pathway feeds into the central metabolism via a specialized beta oxidation pathway obtained from Acinetobacter baylyi.

== See also ==
- Plastivore
- Biodegradable plastic
- E. coli long-term evolution experiment
- Adaptive radiation
- Radiotrophic fungus
- London Underground mosquito
- Lonicera fly
- Mealworms are capable of digesting polystyrene
