= Mycoforestry =

Permaculture forest management system using fungi

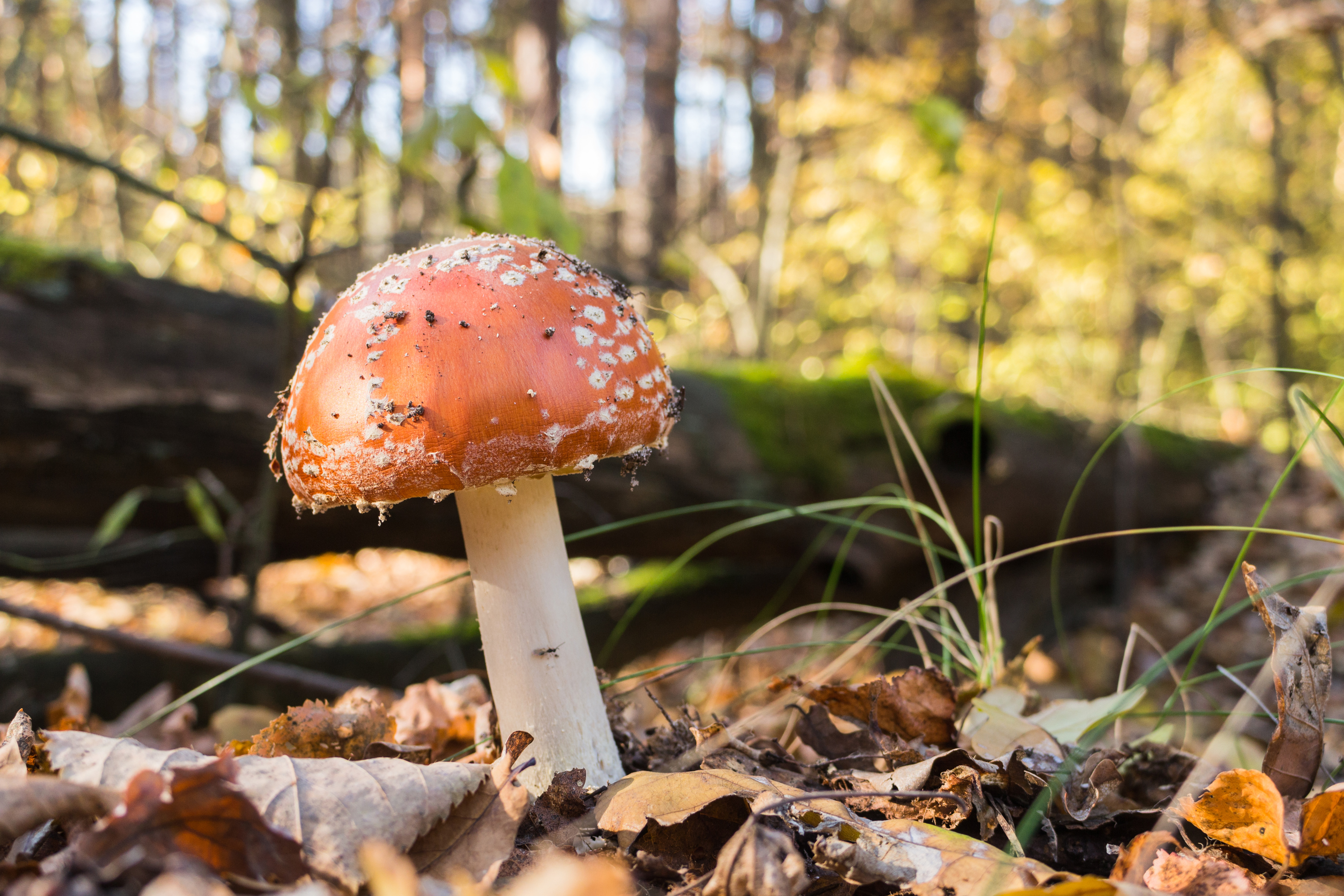
Amanita species are ectomycorrhizal with many trees.

Mycoforestry is an ecological forest management system implemented to enhance forest ecosystems and plant communities, by introducing the mycorrhizal and saprotrophic fungi. Mycoforestry is considered a type of permaculture and can be implemented as a beneficial component of an agroforestry system. It can enhance the yields of tree crops and produce edible mushrooms, an economically valuable product. By integrating plant-fungal associations into a forestry management system, native forests can be preserved, wood waste can be recycled back into the ecosystem, carbon sequestration can be increased, planted restoration sites are enhanced, and the sustainability of forest ecosystems are improved.

Mycoforestry is an alternative to the practice of clearcutting, which removes dead wood from forests, thereby diminishing nutrient availability and reducing soil depth.

== Selection of fungal species ==
According to Paul Stamets, the first principle for the creation of a mycoforestry system is to utilize native fungal species. Implementing a mycoforestry system provides the potential of improving restoration efforts and the possibility of economic gain through mushroom cropping and harvesting. However to utilize native fungal flora, first the relationships between present fungal species and growth substrate, and habitat need to be studied.

A simple way to introduce a mycoforestry system and enhance out-plantings for crops and forest restoration sites is to "use mycorrhizal spore inoculum when replanting forest lands." For this process it is best to match native trees with native mycorrhizal fungi. This method keeps and will promote the functioning of the native ecosystem, and native biodiversity.

It is assumed in a functioning forest ecosystem an underground mycelial network persists even if no fruiting bodies are visible. A period of disappearance of mushrooms from an area should not cause alarm. In order to trigger the formation of fruiting bodies, many fungal species require specific environmental conditions. Most species of fungi do not fruit year round.

Mycoforestry is an emergent scientific field and practice. Until broadly standardized protocols are created and perfected, the collection of both current and historical ecological site conditions will improve the success of the project. Therefore, a survey of fungal relations at the site under both prime and poor conditions is beneficial to implementation of a mycoforestry system.

== Saprotrophic fungi ==
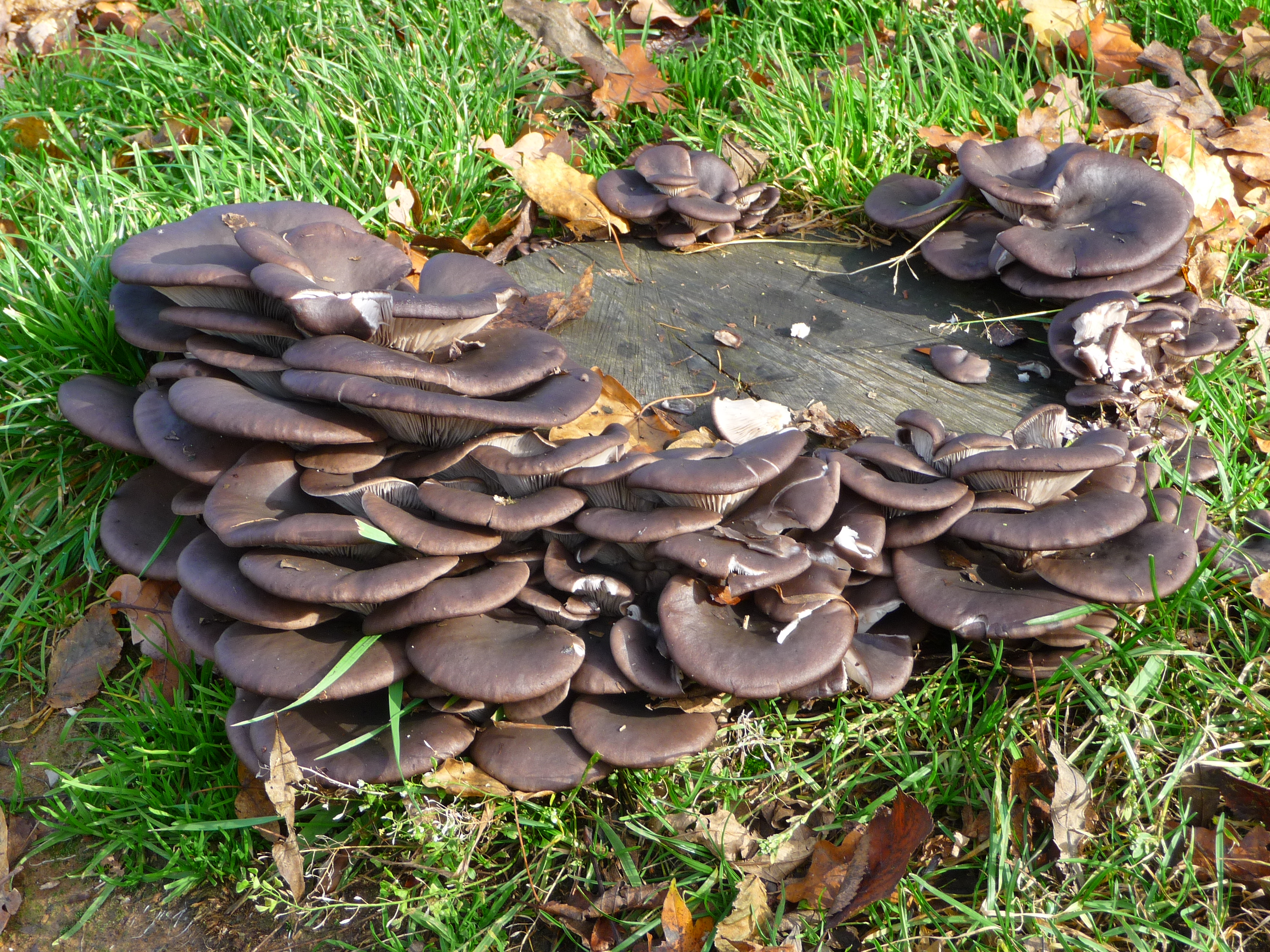
Edible oyster mushrooms (Pleurotus sp.) fruiting from a stump

The second principle is to promote saprotrophic fungi in the environment. Saprophytic fungi are crucial to mycoforestry systems because these are the primary composers breaking down wood and returning nutrients to the soil for use by the rest of the forest ecosystem. This can be accomplished through inoculation of wood debris at site. Spored oils (biodegradable oils containing fungal spores) can be used in chainsaws when problematic or invasive hardwood requires felling. This method is a simple means to inoculate a tree. Additionally plug spawn can be implemented and injected into wood mass again prompting colonization by the selected fungus. Eventually repeated colonization efforts should not be necessary as many fungal life forms are strong and will spread and sustain in the soil on their own.

In management of the mycoforestry system, it is important that dead wood be in contact with the ground. This allows fungus to reach up from the soil and decompose fallen wood releasing nutrients at a much quicker rate then if the wood is left standing. Additionally, it is important to leave dead wood on site for decomposition back into the soil. This philosophy is similarly based to the fact that clearcutting of a forest reduces soil nutrients and thickness.

== Beneficial fungal interactions ==
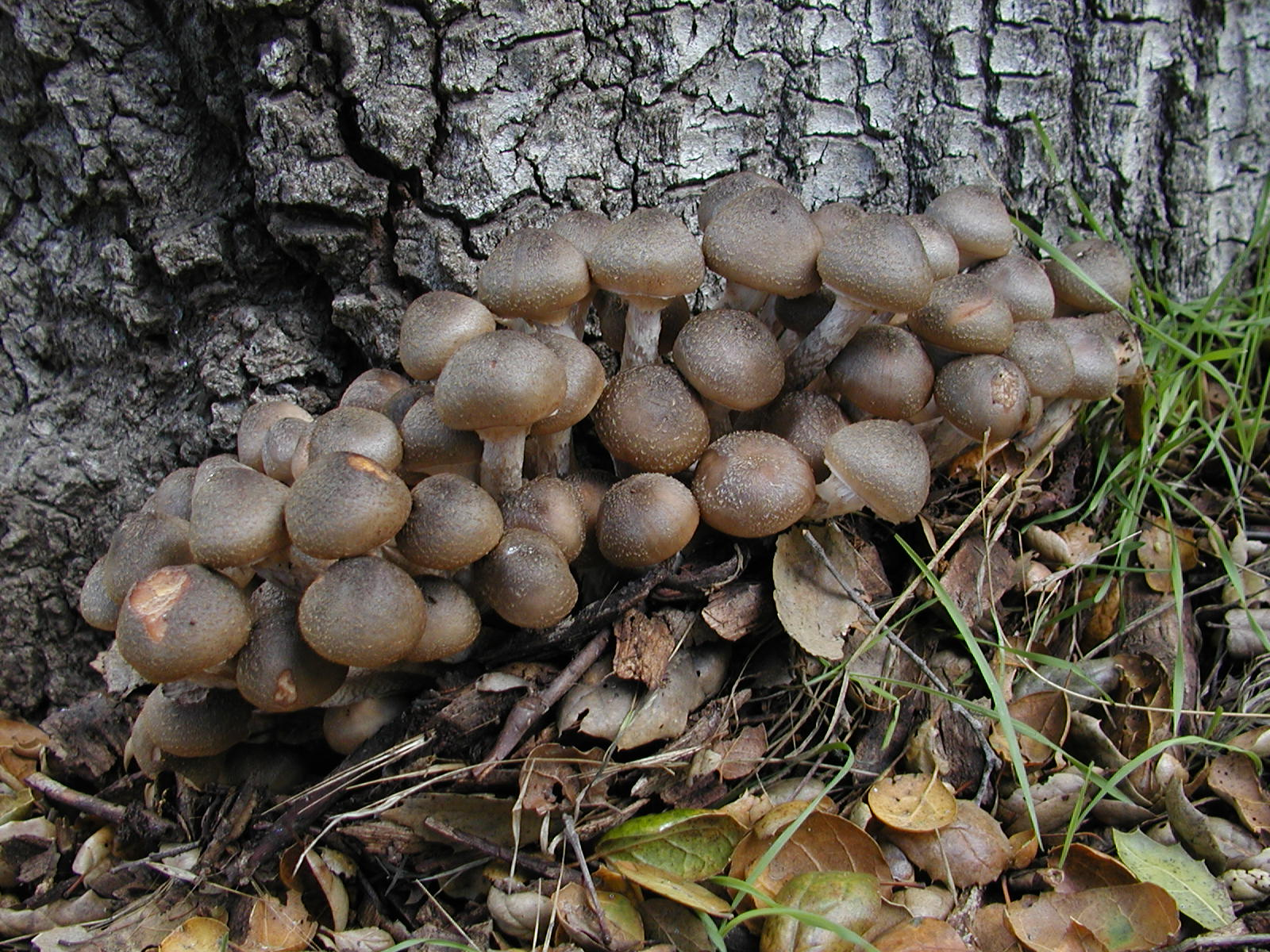
Armillaria, a parasitic fungus

The third principle is to implement species known to benefit plant species. These are commonly mycorrhizal fungus that form long term associations with plants, often extending inside of plants roots, acting as an additional root system, and improving absorption of nutrients and water.

Utilizing mushroom species that attract insects could be a useful source of fish food. This practice makes the mycoforestry a larger system. Unlike most agriculture systems it helps the environment in a number of ways. It ties all biological aspects of the environment together, creating sustainable living and food production as well as sustainable fisheries similar to the ancient Hawaiian Ahupua'a, which utilized sustainable all portions of the land for environmental and food security.

Additionally fungal species can be implemented that compete with disease-causing agents like Armillaria root rots, to provide long term protection of the forestry system.

Additionally, the implementation of an agroforestry system performs mycoremediation and mycofiltration activities, cleaning up toxins and restoring the environment.

== See also ==
- Mycorestoration
