= Paenarthrobacter ureafaciens =

Scientific classification
- Domain: Bacteria
- Kingdom: Bacillati
- Phylum: Actinomycetota
- Class: Actinomycetia
- Order: Micrococcales
- Family: Micrococcaceae
- Genus: Paenarthrobacter
- Species: P. ureafaciens

Binomial name
- Paenarthrobacter ureafaciens (Krebs and Eggleston 1939) Busse 2016

Type strain
- ATCC 7562; CIP 67.3; DSM 20126; IFO 12140; JCM 1337; LMG 3812; NBRC 12140; VKM Ac-1121

Synonyms
- Arthrobacter ureafaciens (Krebs and Eggleston 1939) Clark 1955 (Approved Lists 1980); "Corynebacterium ureafaciens" Krebs and Eggleston 1939

Species of bacterium

Paenarthrobacter ureafaciens is a bacterial species of the genus Paenarthrobacter. Polar lipid profile of this species is an unknown.

The nylon-eating bacteria, Paenarthrobacter ureafaciens KI72, is considered by the NCBI database and Genome Taxonomy Database to be a member of this species.
