= 4-Methylaminobutanoate oxidase (formaldehyde-forming) =

Class of enzymes

4-methylaminobutanoate oxidase (formaldehyde-forming)

Identifiers
- EC no.: 1.5.3.19

Databases
- IntEnz: IntEnz view
- BRENDA: BRENDA entry
- ExPASy: NiceZyme view
- KEGG: KEGG entry
- MetaCyc: metabolic pathway
- PRIAM: profile
- PDB structures: RCSB PDB PDBe PDBsum
Search
- PMC: articles
- PubMed: articles
- NCBI: proteins

4-methylaminobutanoate oxidase (formaldehyde-forming) (EC 1.5.3.19, mabO (gene)) is an enzyme with systematic name 4-methylaminobutanoate:oxygen oxidoreductase (formaldehyde-forming). This enzyme catalyses the following chemical reaction

4-(methylamino)butyric acid
+ H_{2}O
O_{2}
H_{2}O_{2}
O_{2}
H_{2}O_{2}
γ-aminobutyric acid
+ H_{2}C=O

This enzyme is a flavoprotein containing flavin adenine dinucleotide. It is involved in the metabolism of nicotine in Arthrobacter nicotinovorans.
