= Paenarthrobacter aurescens =

Scientific classification
- Domain: Bacteria
- Kingdom: Bacillati
- Phylum: Actinomycetota
- Class: Actinomycetes
- Order: Micrococcales
- Family: Micrococcaceae
- Genus: Paenarthrobacter
- Species: P. aurescens

Binomial name
- Paenarthrobacter aurescens (Phillips 1953) Busse 2016

Type strain
- ATCC 13344; CIP 102364; DSM 20116; HAMBI 1850; IFO 12136; JCM 1330; LMG 3815; NBRC 12136; NRRL B-2879; VKM Ac-1105

Synonyms
- Arthrobacter aurescens Phillips 1953 (Approved Lists 1980)

Species of bacterium

Paenarthrobacter aurescens is a bacterium species from the genus Paenarthrobacter . Paenarthrobacter aurescens produces nitrilase and L-N-carbamoylase. Paenarthrobacter aurescens has a low GC-content and has the ability to utilize anethole.
