= Paenarthrobacter histidinolovorans =

Scientific classification
- Domain: Bacteria
- Kingdom: Bacillati
- Phylum: Actinomycetota
- Class: Actinomycetes
- Order: Micrococcales
- Family: Micrococcaceae
- Genus: Paenarthrobacter
- Species: P. histidinolovorans

Binomial name
- Paenarthrobacter histidinolovorans (Adams 1954) Busse 2016

Type strain
- ATCC 11442; CCUG 23888; CIP 106988; DSM 20115; IFO 15510; JCM 2520; LMG 3822; NBRC 15510; VKM Ac-1978

Synonyms
- Arthrobacter histidinolovorans Adams 1954 (Approved Lists 1980)

Species of bacterium

Paenarthrobacter histidinolovorans is a bacterium species from the genus Paenarthrobacter which has been isolated from soil. Paenarthrobacter histidinolovorans produces histidinol dehydrogenase.
