= 6-aminohexanoate-dimer hydrolase =

Class of enzymes

Identifiers
- EC no.: 3.5.1.46
- CAS no.: 75216-15-8

Databases
- IntEnz: IntEnz view
- BRENDA: BRENDA entry
- ExPASy: NiceZyme view
- KEGG: KEGG entry
- MetaCyc: metabolic pathway
- PRIAM: profile
- PDB structures: RCSB PDB PDBe PDBsum
- Gene Ontology: AmiGO / QuickGO
Search
- PMC: articles
- PubMed: articles
- NCBI: proteins

In enzymology, a 6-aminohexanoate-dimer hydrolase (EC 3.5.1.46) is an enzyme that catalyzes the chemical reaction N-(6-aminohexanoyl)-6-aminohexanoate + H_{2}O $\rightleftharpoons$ 2 6-aminohexanoate. Thus, the two substrates of this enzyme are N-(6-aminohexanoyl)-6-aminohexanoate and H_{2}O, whereas its product is two molecules of 6-aminohexanoate.

This enzyme belongs to the family of hydrolases, those acting on carbon-nitrogen bonds other than peptide bonds, specifically in linear amides. The systematic name of this enzyme class is N-(6-aminohexanoyl)-6-aminohexanoate amidohydrolase. This enzyme is also called 6-aminohexanoic acid oligomer hydrolase.

== Structural studies ==
As of late 2007, 3 structures have been solved for this class of enzymes, with PDB accession codes 1WYB, 1WYC, and 2DCF.

== See also ==
- Nylon-eating bacteria
