= Paenarthrobacter nitroguajacolicus =

Scientific classification
- Domain: Bacteria
- Kingdom: Bacillati
- Phylum: Actinomycetota
- Class: Actinomycetes
- Order: Micrococcales
- Family: Micrococcaceae
- Genus: Paenarthrobacter
- Species: P. nitroguajacolicus

Binomial name
- Paenarthrobacter nitroguajacolicus (Kotoučková et al. 2004) Busse 2016

Type strain
- CCM 4924; DSM 15232; G2-1; JCM 14115

Synonyms
- Arthrobacter nitroguajacolicus Kotoučková et al. 2004

Species of bacterium

Paenarthrobacter nitroguajacolicus is a bacterium species from the genus Paenarthrobacter which has been isolated from soil in the Czech Republic. Paenarthrobacter nitroguajacolicus has the ability to degrade 4-nitroguaiacol.
