= Paenarthrobacter ilicis =

Scientific classification
- Domain: Bacteria
- Kingdom: Bacillati
- Phylum: Actinomycetota
- Class: Actinomycetia
- Order: Micrococcales
- Family: Micrococcaceae
- Genus: Paenarthrobacter
- Species: P. ilicis

Binomial name
- Paenarthrobacter ilicis (Collins et al. 1982) Busse 2016

Type strain
- ATCC 14264; DSM 20138; NCPPB 1228

Synonyms
- Arthrobacter ilicis Collins et al. 1982

Species of bacterium

Paenarthrobacter ilicis is a bacterium species from the genus Paenarthrobacter.

This species can use L-arginine, L-asparagine, L-histidine, L-arabinose, D-galactose, D-glucose, D-ribose, Dxylose, inositol, 4-aminobutyrate, and p-hydroxybenzoate as a carbon source; it is not able to utilize L-leucine, butanediol, ormalonate.
