= Radiosynthesis (metabolism) =

Biological process

Radiosynthesis is the theorized capture and metabolism, by living organisms, of energy from ionizing radiation, analogously to photosynthesis. Metabolism of ionizing radiation was theorized as early as 1956 by the Russian microbiologist S. I. Kuznetsov.

Beginning in the 1990s, researchers at the Chernobyl Nuclear Power Plant uncovered some 200 species of apparently radiotrophic fungi containing the pigment melanin on the walls of the reactor room and in the surrounding soil. Such "melanized" fungi have also been discovered in nutrient-poor, high-altitude areas which are exposed to high levels of ultraviolet radiation.

Following the Ukrainian results, an American team at the Albert Einstein College of Medicine of Yeshiva University in New York began experimenting with radiation exposure of melanin and melanized fungi. They found that ionizing radiation increased the ability of melanin to support an important metabolic reaction, and that Cryptococcus neoformans fungi grew three times faster than normal. Microbiologist Ekaterina Dadachova suggested such fungi could serve as a food supply and source of radiation protection for interplanetary astronauts, who would be exposed to cosmic rays.

In 2014, the American research group was awarded a patent for a method of enhancing the growth of microorganisms through increasing melanin content. The inventors of this process claimed their fungi were employing radiosynthesis, and hypothesized that radiosynthesis may have played a role in early life on Earth, by allowing melanized fungi to act as autotrophs.

From October 2018 through March 2019, NASA conducted an experiment aboard the International Space Station to study radiotrophic fungi as a potential radiation barrier to the harmful radiation in space. Radiotrophic fungi have many possible applications on Earth as well, potentially including a disposal method for nuclear waste or use as high-altitude biofuel or a nutrition source.
