= Paenarthrobacter =

Scientific classification
- Domain: Bacteria
- Kingdom: Bacillati
- Phylum: Actinomycetota
- Class: Actinomycetia
- Order: Micrococcales
- Family: Micrococcaceae
- Genus: Paenarthrobacter; Busse 2016

Type species
- Paenarthrobacter aurescens (Phillips 1953) Busse 2016

Species
- P. aurescens (Phillips 1953) Busse 2016; P. histidinolovorans (Adams 1954) Busse 2016; P. ilicis (Collins et al. 1982) Busse 2016; P. nicotinovorans (Kodama et al. 1992) Busse 2016; P. nitroguajacolicus (Kotoučková et al. 2004) Busse 2016; P. ureafaciens (Krebs and Eggleston 1939) Busse 2016

Genus of bacteria

Paenarthrobacter is a genus of bacteria from the family Micrococcaceae.

Paenarthrobacter members share the following properties:

- A3a type peptidoglycan
- Menaquinone MK-9(H2)
- A polar lipid profile composed primarily of diphosphatidylglycerol, phosphatidylglycerol, phosphatidylinositol, dimannosylglyceride, and monogalactosyldiacylglycerol; and to a lesser extent, trimannosyldiacylglycerol.
- A fatty acid composition primarily from anteiso-C15:0, and to a lesser extent iso-C15:0, iso-C16:0, anteiso-C17:0 and isoC14.
- A genomic GC content in the range of 61.3–62.5 mol%.
