= Mycorestoration =

Use of fungi for restoring environments

Mycorestoration is the use of fungi to restore degraded environments. It is a multi-method approach to restore damaged habitats such as oil spill sites and logging roads, while also restoring the health of targeted forest sites that have been compromised in development. Mycorestoration is also used to control insect populations. It generally uses a four-tier approach of mycofiltration, mycoforestry, mycoremediation, and mycopesticides. The mycelia of a number of different gilled fungi are used in some of these applications.
