= Nicotine dehydrogenase =

Enzyme

Identifiers
- EC no.: 1.5.99.4
- CAS no.: 37256-31-8

Databases
- BRENDA: enzyme data
- ExPASy: NiceZyme view
- KEGG: enzyme entry
- MetaCyc: metabolic pathway
- Rhea: reactions
- PDB structures: RCSB PDB PDBe PDBsum
- Gene Ontology: AmiGO / QuickGO
Search
- PMC: articles
- PubMed: articles
- NCBI: proteins

Nicotine dehydrogenase (EC 1.5.99.4) is an enzyme that catalyzes the chemical reaction

nicotine
+ electron
acceptor
H_{2}O
6-hydroxynicotine
+ reduced
acceptor

The three substrates of this enzyme are nicotine, water and an electron acceptor. Its products are 6-hydroxynicotine and the corresponding reduced acceptor.

This enzyme belongs to the family of oxidoreductases, specifically those acting on the CH-NH group of donors with other acceptors. The systematic name of this enzyme class is nicotine:acceptor 6-oxidoreductase (hydroxylating). Other names in common use include nicotine oxidase, D-nicotine oxidase, nicotine:(acceptor) 6-oxidoreductase (hydroxylating), and L-nicotine oxidase. It is a metalloprotein that contains flavin mononucleotide.
