= 6-aminohexanoate-cyclic-dimer hydrolase =

Class of enzymes

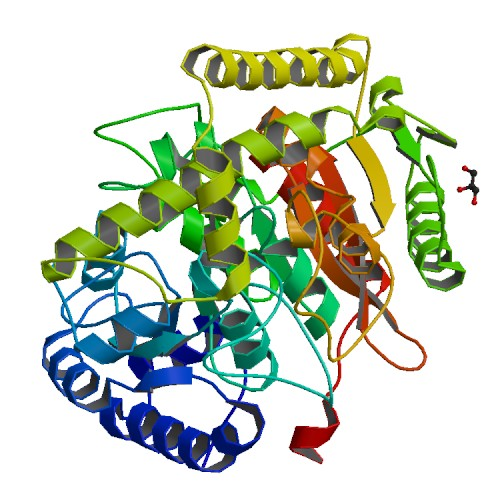
- Crystal structure of Nylonase A

Identifiers
- EC no.: 3.5.2.12
- CAS no.: 60976-29-6

Databases
- BRENDA: enzyme data
- ExPASy: NiceZyme view
- KEGG: enzyme entry
- MetaCyc: metabolic pathway
- Rhea: reactions
- PDB structures: RCSB PDB PDBe PDBsum
- Gene Ontology: AmiGO / QuickGO
Search
- PMC: articles
- PubMed: articles
- NCBI: proteins

6-aminohexanoate-cyclic-dimer hydrolase (EC 3.5.2.12) is an enzyme characterised from Achromobacter guttatus that catalyzes the hydrolysis of a cyclic lactam to its open-chain form:

1,8-diazacyclotetradecane-2,9-dione
H_{2}O
N-(6-aminohexanoyl)-6-aminohexanoic acid

Nylon 6 is a synthetic polymer made up of 6-aminohexanoic acid units and this enzyme is involved in its biodegradation.

This enzyme is a hydrolase, one acting on carbon-nitrogen bonds other than peptide bonds, specifically in cyclic amides. The systematic name of this enzyme class is 1,8-diazacyclotetradecane-2,9-dione lactamhydrolase.
