= Mycorrhizal bioremediation =

Process involving plants and fungi

Mycorrhizal amelioration of heavy metals or pollutants is a process by which mycorrhizal fungi in a mutualistic relationship with plants can sequester toxic compounds from the environment, as a form of bioremediation.

== Mycorrhizae-plant partners ==
These symbiotic relationships are generally between plants and arbuscular mycorrhizae in the Glomeromycota clade of fungi. Other types of fungi have been documented. For example, there is a case where zinc phytoextraction from willows was increased after the Basidiomycete fungus Paxillus involutus was inoculated in the soil.

== Mechanisms of the symbiosis ==
The mycorrhizae allow the plants to increase their biomass, which increases their tolerance to heavy metals. The fungi also stimulate the uptake of heavy metals (such as manganese and cadmium) with the enzymes and organic acids (such as acetic acid and malic acid) that they excrete into their surroundings in order to digest them.

== Mycorrhizae on plant toleration ==
The fungi can prevent heavy metals from traveling past the roots of the plant. They can also store heavy metals in their vacuoles. However, in some cases, the fungi do not decrease the uptake of heavy metals by plants but increase their tolerance. In some cases, this is done by increasing the overall biomass of the plant so that there is a lower concentration of metals. They can also modify the response of the plant to heavy metals at the level of plant transcription and translation.

=== Colonization of barren soil ===
Mycorrhizae remain functional underground following extreme conditions, such as a forest fire. Researchers believe that this allows them to obtain minerals and nutrients that are released during a fire before they are leached out of the soil. This likely increases the ability to recover quickly after forest fires.

Serpentine soils are in part characterized by a low calcium-to-magnesium ratio. Studies indicate that arbuscular mycorrhiza helps plants increase their magnesium uptake in soils with low amounts of magnesium. However, plants in serpentine soils inoculated with fungus either showed no effect on magnesium concentration or decreased magnesium uptake.

=== Resistance to toxicity ===
Studies show that mycorrhizal symbionts of poplar seedlings are capable of preventing heavy metals reaching vulnerable parts of the plant by keeping the toxins in the rhizosphere. Another study demonstrates that Arctostaphylos uva-ursi plants in symbiotic relationships were more resistant to toxins because the fungi helped the plants grow below toxic layers of soil.

== Application in bioremediation ==
In China's provinces of Guizhou, Yunnan and Guangxi, rocky desertification is expanding and is not well controlled. This area is characterized by soil depletion, soil erosion and droughts. It is very difficult for plants to grow in this region, and it is mostly filled with drought-resistant plants, lithophytes and calciphilopteris plants. Morus alba, commonly known as a mulberry, is a drought-resistant tree that can tolerate barren soils. It has been found that mulberry inoculated with arbuscular mycorrhiza has increased survivability in karst desert areas and, therefore, an increased rate of soil improvement and reduced erosion.

In 1993, artist Mel Chin collaborated with USDA agronomist Dr. Rufus Chaney in an effort to detoxify Pigs Eye Landfill, a superfund site in Saint Paul, Minnesota. The team planted Thlaspi, which had been selected for increased uptake and sequestration of heavy metals. Analysis showed elevated cadmium concentrations in Thlaspi biomass. It has been found that Thlaspi has a significant arbuscular mycorrhiza association.

Slovakia has many heavy metal mines, which have caused significant regional soil contamination. Samples of Thlaspi harvested in Slovakia from contaminated soils near a lead mine showed increased levels of cadmium, lead, and zinc. Furthermore, Thlaspi growing in contaminated regions had higher rates of certain arbuscular mycorrhizal fungi when compared to non-contaminated Thlaspi. Since manual clean-up is usually inefficient and expensive, mycorrhiza colonized Thlaspi may be useful in bioremediation efforts.

== See also ==
- Bioremediation
- Mycoremediation
- Phytoremediation
