= Mycoremediation =

Process of using fungi to degrade or sequester contaminants in the environment

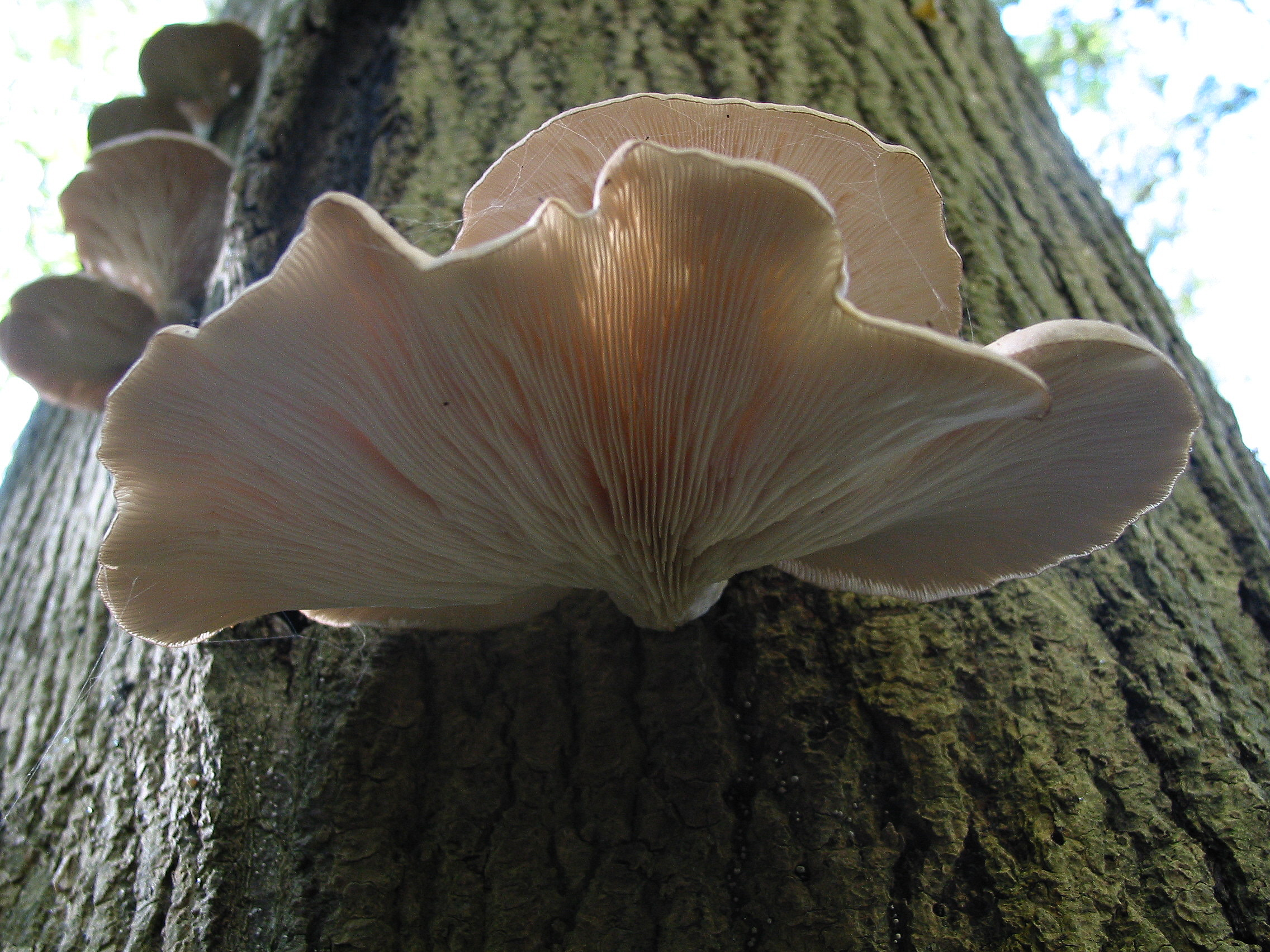
Pleurotus ostreatus (Oyster mushroom)

Mycoremediation (from ancient Greek μύκης (mukēs), meaning "fungus", and the suffix -remedium, in Latin meaning 'restoring balance') is a form of bioremediation in which fungi-based remediation methods are used to decontaminate the environment. Fungi have been proven to be a cheap, effective and environmentally sound way for removing a wide array of contaminants from damaged environments or wastewater. These contaminants include heavy metals, organic pollutants, textile dyes, leather tanning chemicals and wastewater, petroleum fuels, polycyclic aromatic hydrocarbons, pharmaceuticals and personal care products, pesticides and herbicides in land, fresh water, and marine environments.

The byproducts of the remediation can be valuable materials themselves, such as enzymes (like laccase), edible or medicinal mushrooms, making the remediation process even more profitable. Some fungi are useful in the biodegradation of contaminants in extremely cold or radioactive environments where traditional remediation methods prove too costly or are unusable.

== Pollutants ==
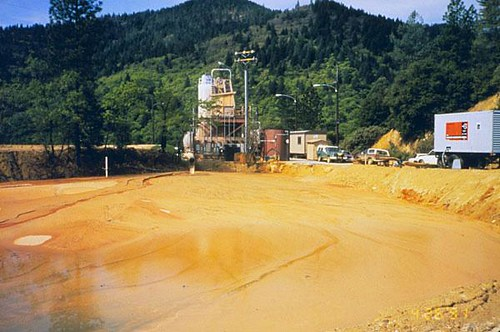
Acid mine drainage from a metallic sulfide mine

Fungi, thanks to their non-specific enzymes, are able to break down many kinds of substances including pharmaceuticals and fragrances that are normally recalcitrant to bacteria degradation, such as paracetamol (also known as acetaminophen). For example, using Mucor hiemalis, the breakdown of products which are toxic in traditional water treatment, such as phenols and pigments of wine distillery wastewater, X-ray contrast agents, and ingredients of personal care products, can be broken down in a non-toxic way.

Mycoremediation is a cheaper method of remediation, and it doesn't usually require expensive equipment. For this reason, it is often used in small scale applications, such as mycofiltration of domestic wastewater, and industrial effluent filtration.

According to a 2015 study, mycoremediation can even help with the polycyclic aromatic hydrocarbons (PAH) soil biodegradation. Soils soaked with creosote contain high concentrations of PAH and in order to stop the spread, mycoremediation has proven to be the most successful strategy.

=== Metals ===
Pollution from metals is very common, as they are used in many industrial processes such as electroplating, textiles, paint and leather. The wastewater from these industries is often used for agricultural purposes, so besides the immediate damage to the ecosystem it is spilled into, the metals can enter creatures and humans far away through the food chain. Mycoremediation is one of the cheapest, most effective and environmental-friendly solutions to this problem. Many fungi are hyperaccumulators, therefore they are able to concentrate toxins in their fruiting bodies for later removal. This is usually true for populations that have been exposed to contaminants for a long time, and have developed a high tolerance. Hyperaccumulation occurs via biosorption on the cellular surface, where the metals enter the mycelium passively with very little intracellular uptake. A variety of fungi, such as Pleurotus, Aspergillus, and Trichoderma, have proven to be effective in the removal of lead, cadmium, nickel, chromium, mercury, arsenic, copper, boron, iron and zinc in marine environments, wastewater and on land.

Not all the individuals of a species are effective in the same way in the accumulation of toxins. The single individuals are usually selected from an older polluted environment, such as sludge or wastewater, where they had time to adapt to the circumstances, and the selection is carried on in the laboratory. A dilution of the water can drastically improve the ability of biosorption of the fungi.

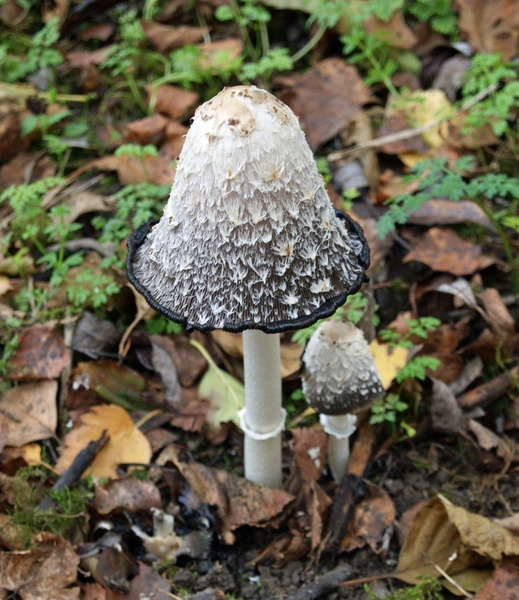
Coprinus comatus (Shaggy ink cap)

The capacity of certain fungi to extract metals from the ground also can be useful for bioindicator purposes, and can be a problem when the mushroom is of an edible variety. For example, the shaggy ink cap (Coprinus comatus), a common edible mushroom found in the Northern Hemisphere, can be a very good bioindicator of mercury. However, as the shaggy ink cap accumulates mercury in its body, it can be toxic to the consumer.

The capacity of metals uptake of mushroom has also been used to recover precious metals from medium. For example, VTT Technical Research Centre of Finland reported an 80% recovery of gold from electronic waste using mycofiltration techniques.

=== Organic pollutants ===
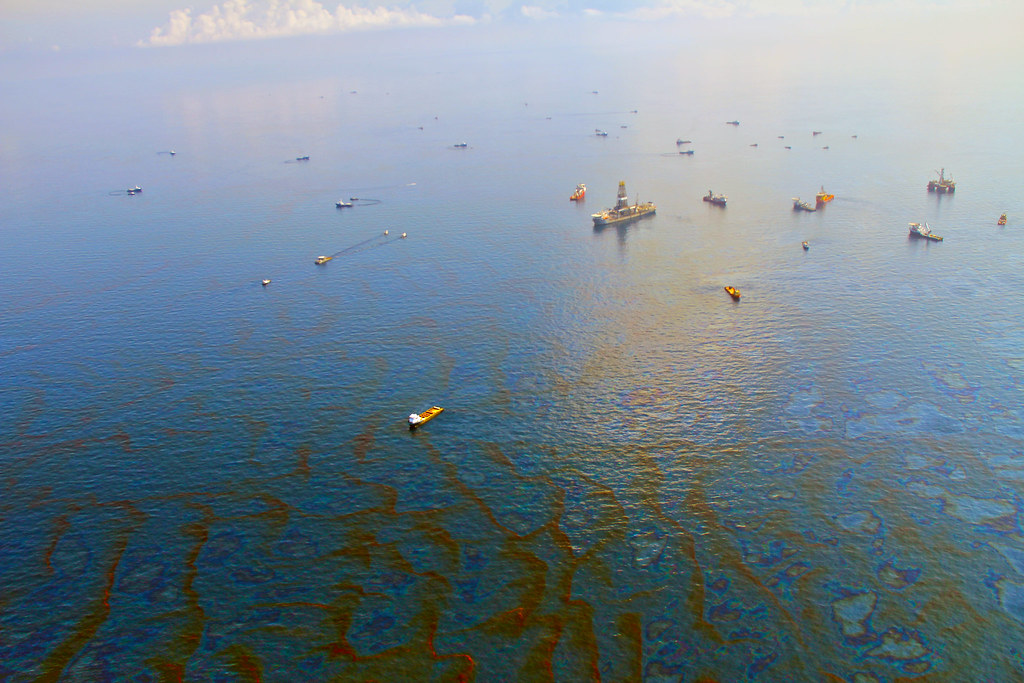
Deepwater Horizon oil spill site with visible oil slicks

Fungi are amongst the primary saprotrophic organisms in an ecosystem, as they are efficient in the decomposition of matter. Wood-decay fungi, especially white rot, secrete extracellular enzymes and acids that break down lignin and cellulose, the two main building blocks of plant fiber. These are long-chain organic (carbon-based) compounds, structurally similar to many organic pollutants. They achieve this using a wide array of enzymes. In the case of polycyclic aromatic hydrocarbons (PAHs), complex organic compounds with fused, highly stable, polycyclic aromatic rings, fungi are very effective in addition to marine environments. The enzymes involved in this degradation are ligninolytic and include lignin peroxidase, versatile peroxidase, manganese peroxidase, general lipase, laccase and sometimes intracellular enzymes, especially the cytochrome P450.

Other toxins fungi are able to degrade into harmless compounds include petroleum fuels, phenols in wastewater, polychlorinated biphenyl (PCB) in contaminated soils using Pleurotus ostreatus, polyurethane in aerobic and anaerobic conditions, such as conditions at the bottom of landfills using two species of the Ecuadorian fungus Pestalotiopsis, and more.

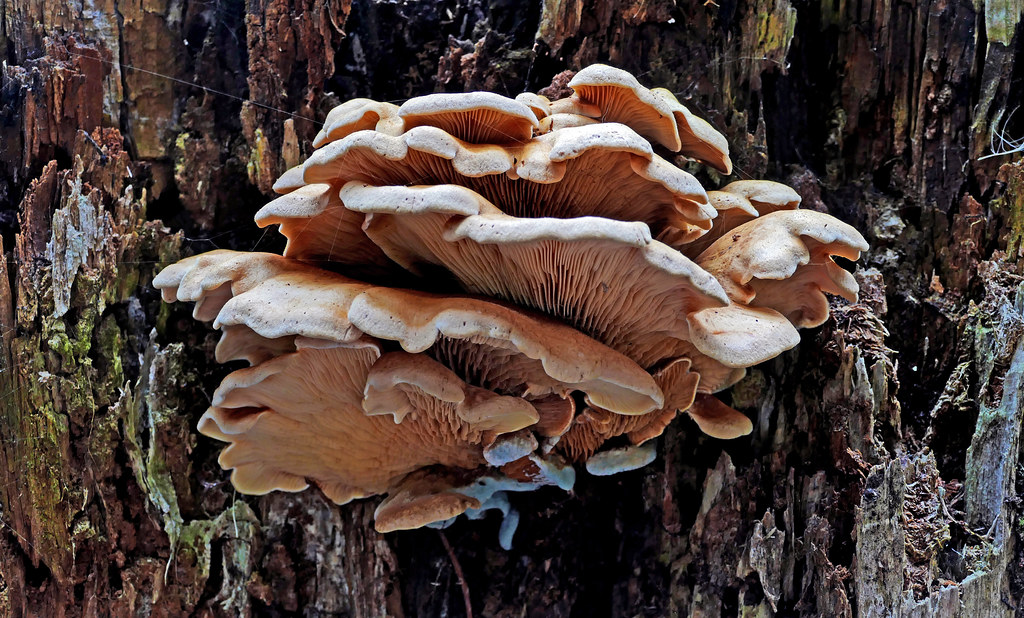
Pleurotus pulmonarius

The mechanisms of degradation are not always clear, as the mushroom may be a precursor to subsequent microbial activity rather than individually effective in the removal of pollutants.

=== Pesticides ===
Pesticide contamination can be long-term and have a significant impact on decomposition processes and nutrient cycling. Therefore, their degradation can be expensive and difficult. The most commonly used fungi for helping in the degradation of such substances are white rot fungi, which, thanks to their extracellular ligninolytic enzymes like laccase and manganese peroxidase, are able to degrade high quantity of such components. Examples includes the insecticide endosulfan, imazalil, thiophanate methyl, ortho-phenylphenol, diphenylamine, chlorpyrifos in wastewater, and atrazine in clay-loamy soils.

=== Dyes ===
Dyes are used in many industries, like paper printing or textile. They are often recalcitrant to degradation and in some cases, like some azo dyes, carcinogenic or otherwise toxic.

The mechanism by which the fungi degrade dyes is via their lignolytic enzymes, especially laccase, therefore white rot mushrooms are the most commonly used.

Mycoremediation has proven to be a cheap and effective remediation technology for dyes such as malachite green, nigrosin and basic fuchsin with Aspergillus niger and Phanerochaete chrysosporium and Congo red, a carcinogenic dye recalcitrant to biodegradative processes, direct blue 14 (using Pleurotus).

=== Pentachlorophenol ===
Pentachlorophenol (PCP) has been used worldwide as a wood preservative, biocides and for the bleaching of paper or tissues. PCP toxicity and extensive use has placed it among the worst environmental pollutants, and therefore its microbiological degradation to develop bioremediation techniques has been intensively studied.

Microorganisms play an important role in the field of environmental science by degrading and transforming PCP into non-toxic or less toxic forms. Naturally how completely and efficiently PCP degradation occurs depends by microorganisms and the environmental conditions.There are numerous studies that focus research efforts on degradation of PCP by pure and mixed cultures of aerobic and anaerobic microorganisms. Conditions that inhibit and enhance degradation, and pathways, intermediates and enzyme systems implicated essentially in PCP degradation especially by bacteria such as Pseudomonas spp., Flavobacterium spp., Nocardioides spp., Novosphingobium spp., Desulfitobacterium spp., Mycobacterium spp., Sphingomonas sp., Kokuria spp., Bacillus spp., Serratia sp. and Acinetobacter spp. and fungi such as Phanerochaete spp., Anthracophyllum spp., Trametes spp., Mucor spp., Byssochlamys spp. and Scopulariopsis spp.

== Synergy with phytoremediation ==
Phytoremediation is the use of plant-based technologies to decontaminate an area.

Most land plants can form a symbiotic relationship with fungi which is advantageous for both organisms. This relationship is called mycorrhiza. Researchers found that phytoremediation is enhanced by mycorrhizae. Mycorrhizal fungi's symbiotic relationships with plant roots help with the uptake of nutrients and the plant's ability to resist biotic and abiotic stress factors such as heavy metals bioavailable in the rhizosphere. Arbuscular mycorrhizal fungi (AMF) produce proteins that bind heavy metals and thereby decrease their bioavailability. The removal of soil contaminants by mycorrhizal fungi is called mycorrhizoremediation.

Mycorrhizal fungi, especially AMF, can greatly improve the phytoremediation capacity of some plants. This is mostly due to the stress the plants suffer because of the pollutants is greatly reduced in the presence of AMF, so they can grow more and produce more biomass. The fungi also provide more nutrition, especially phosphorus, and promote the overall health of the plants. The mycelium's quick expansion can also greatly extend the rhizosphere influence zone (hyphosphere), providing the plant with access to more nutrients and contaminants. Increasing the rhizosphere overall health also means a rise in the bacteria population, which can also contribute to the bioremediation process.

This relationship has been proven useful with many pollutants, such as Rhizophagus intraradices and Robinia pseudoacacia in lead contaminated soil, Rhizophagus intraradices with Glomus versiforme inoculated into vetiver grass for lead removal, AMF and Calendula officinalis in cadmium and lead contaminated soil, and in general was effective in increasing the plant bioremediation capacity for metals, petroleum fuels, and PAHs. In wetlands AMF greatly promote the biodegradation of organic pollutants like benzene-, methyl tert-butyl ether- and ammonia from groundwater when inoculated into Phragmites australis.

== Viability in extreme environments ==
Antarctic fungi species such as Metschnikowia sp., Cryptococcus gilvescens, Cryptococcus victoriae, Pichia caribbica and Leucosporidium creatinivorum can withstand extreme cold and still provide efficient biodegradation of contaminants. Due to the nature of colder, remote environments like Antarctica, usual methods of contaminant remediation, such as the physical removal of contaminated media, can prove costly. Most species of psychrophilic Antarctic fungi are resistant to the decreased levels of ATP (adenosine triphosphate) production causing reduced energy availability, decreased levels of oxygen due to the low permeability of frozen soil, and nutrient transportation disruption caused by freeze-thaw cycles. These species of fungi are able to assimilate and degrade compounds such as phenols, n-Hexadecane, toluene, and polycyclic aromatic hydrocarbons in these harsh conditions. These compounds are found in crude oil and refined petroleum.

Some fungi species, like Rhodotorula taiwanensis, are resistant to the extremely low pH (acidic) and radioactive medium found in radioactive waste and can successfully grow in these conditions, unlike most other organisms. They can also thrive in the presence of high concentrations of mercury and chromium. Fungi such as Rhodotorula taiwanensis can possibly be used in the bioremediation of radioactive waste due to their low pH and radiation resistant properties. Certain species of fungi are able to absorb and retain radionuclides such as ^{137}Cs, ^{121}Sr, ^{152}Eu, ^{239}Pu and ^{241}Am. In fact, cell walls of some species of dead fungi can be used as a filter that can adsorb heavy metals and radionuclides present in industrial effluents, preventing them from being released into the environment.

== Fire management ==
Mycoremediation can even be used for fire management with the encapsulation method. This process consists of using fungal spores coated with agarose in a pellet form, which is introduced to a substrate in the burnt forest, breaking down toxins and stimulating growth.

== See also ==
- Compost
- Mycorestoration
- Mycorrhizal bioremediation
- Phytoremediation
