= Radiotrophic fungus =

Fungus capable of radiosynthesis

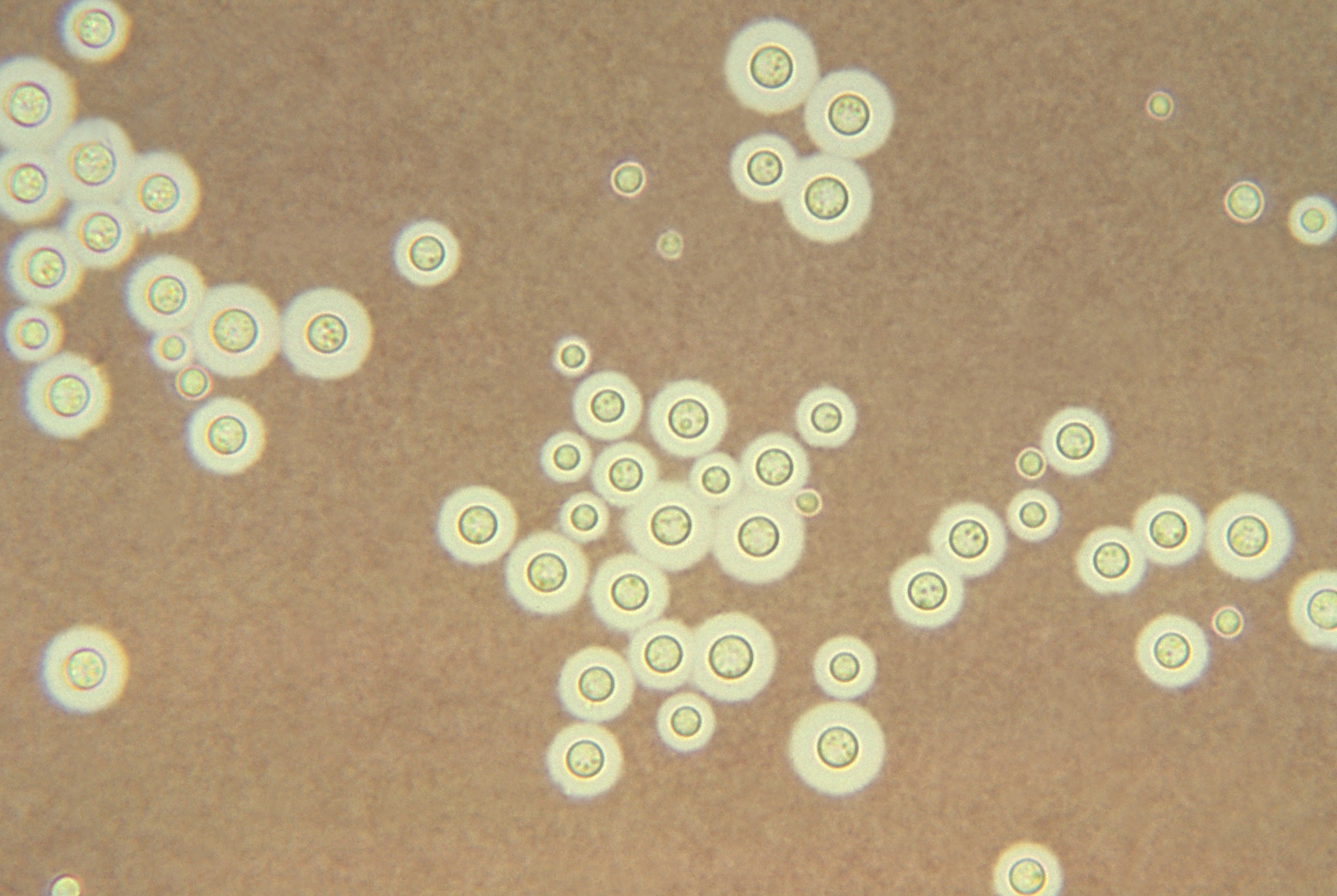
Cryptococcus neoformans stained with light India ink

Radiotrophic fungi are fungi that can perform the biological process called radiosynthesis, which means using ionizing radiation as a main energy source to drive metabolization. It has been claimed that radiotrophic fungi have been found in extreme environments such as in the Chernobyl Nuclear Power Plant.

Most radiotrophic fungi use melanin in some capacity to survive. The process of using radiation and melanin for energy has been termed radiosynthesis, and is thought to be analogous to anaerobic respiration. However, it is not known if multi-step processes such as photosynthesis or chemosynthesis are used in radiosynthesis.

== Discovery ==
Many fungi have been isolated from the area around the destroyed Chernobyl Nuclear Power Plant, some of which have been observed directing their growth of hyphae toward radioactive graphite from the disaster, a phenomenon called "radiotropism". Study has ruled out the presence of carbon as the resource attracting the fungal colonies, and in fact concluded that some fungi will preferentially grow in the direction of the source of beta and gamma ionizing radiation, but were not able to identify the biological mechanism behind this effect. It has also been observed that other melanin-rich fungi were discovered in the cooling water from some other working nuclear reactors. The light-absorbing compound in the fungus cell membranes had the effect of turning the water black. While there are many cases of extremophiles (organisms that can live in severe conditions such as that of the radioactive power plant), a hypothetical radiotrophic fungus would grow because of the radiation, rather than in spite of it.

Further research conducted at the Albert Einstein College of Medicine showed that three melanin-containing fungi—Cladosporium sphaerospermum, Wangiella dermatitidis, and Cryptococcus neoformans—increased in biomass and accumulated acetate faster in an environment in which the radiation level was 500 times higher than in the normal environment. C. sphaerospermum in particular was chosen due to this species being found in the reactor at Chernobyl. Dadachova et al found that by exposing C. neoformans cells to these radiation levels, the organisms rapidly (within 20–40 minutes of exposure) altered the chemical properties of their melanin, and increased melanin-mediated rates of electron transfer (measured as reduction of ferricyanide by NADH) three- to four-fold compared with unexposed organisms. However, each culture was performed with at least limited nutrients provided to each fungus. The increase in biomass and other effects could be caused either by the cells directly deriving energy from ionizing radiation, or by the radiation allowing the cells to utilize traditional nutrients either more efficiently or more rapidly.

Outside of the laboratory studies, similar effects on melanin electron-transport capability were observed by the authors after organism exposure to non-ionizing radiation. The authors did not conclude whether light or heat radiation would have a similar effect on the fungi.

== Role of melanin ==
Melanins are a family of dark-colored, naturally occurring pigments with radiation-shielding properties. These pigments can absorb electromagnetic radiation due to their molecular structure, which results in their dark color; this quality suggests that melanin could help protect radiotropic fungi from ionizing radiation. It has been suggested that melanin's radiation-shielding properties are due to its ability to trap free radicals formed during radiolysis of water. Melanin production is also advantageous to the fungus in that it can aid survival in many extreme environments. Examples of these environments include the Chernobyl Nuclear Power Plant, the International Space Station, and the Transantarctic Mountains. Melanin may also be able to help the fungus metabolize radiation, but more evidence and research is still needed.

== Comparisons with non-melanized fungi ==
Melanization may come at some metabolic cost to the fungal cells. In the absence of radiation, some non-melanized fungi (that had been mutated in the melanin pathway) grew faster than their melanized counterparts. Limited uptake of nutrients due to the melanin molecules in the fungal cell wall or toxic intermediates formed in melanin biosynthesis have been suggested to contribute to this phenomenon. It is consistent with the observation that despite being capable of producing melanin, many fungi do not synthesize melanin constitutively (i.e., all the time), but often only in response to external stimuli or at different stages of their development. The exact biochemical processes in the suggested melanin-based synthesis of organic compounds or other metabolites for fungal growth, including the chemical intermediates (such as native electron donor and acceptor molecules) in the fungal cell and the location and chemical products of this process, are unknown. Radiotrophic fungi are speculated to have been more widespread and numerous in the Hadean with Natural nuclear fission reactor phenomena being more abundant. The pathway to radio-synthesis may exist dormant, as a sort of genetic appendix in several other ancient lifeforms.

== Use in human spaceflight ==
It is hypothesized that radiotrophic fungi could potentially be used as a biological shield to attenuate ionizing radiation, specifically for the protection of astronauts in deep space. To test the potential of biotechnology for in situ resource utilization (ISRU) and radioprotection, an experiment was conducted aboard the International Space Station (ISS) from December 2018 through January 2019. The experiment cultivated the dematiaceous fungus Cladosporium sphaerospermum to observe its growth and attenuation capabilities over a period of approximately 26 days (622.5 hours).

The on-orbit results indicated a qualitative and quantitative growth advantage in the space environment compared to Earth-based ground controls, suggesting a possible radioadaptive response. Radiation levels measured directly beneath the approximately 1.67 mm-thick fungal growth layer were found to be lower than those beneath a no-growth negative control. In the initial phase of the experiment, before significant biomass had formed, there was no measurable difference in radiation counts between the two groups; however, a more significant reduction in recorded ionizing events correlated with the later stages of the experiment once the fungal biomass and melanin content had matured.

Due to the limitations of the experimental hardware, specifically the use of photodiode sensors highly sensitive to low-energy wave radiation (X and gamma rays) rather than the highly energetic Galactic Cosmic Rays (GCR) dominant in deep space, macroscopic dosimetric extrapolations require further validation. Nonetheless, the study concluded that melanized biological compounds represent a promising passive shielding material against energized particles. Because natural melanin can be produced biotechnologically, it could be readily available through ISRU. To increase density for structural and shielding purposes, fungal biomass or melanin can be integrated with abundant in situ resources like Martian regolith, analogous to the concept of Martian "biolith". Additionally, layers of melanin can be incorporated into textiles, resins, or fibrous composites for application on EVA suits and inflatable spacecraft infrastructure to protect against surface damage from ultraviolet light.

== In popular culture ==
A ruined future Earth inherited by a planetary-scale radiotrophic fungus is a major plot device of the Relics Of The Machine episode titled ALONE.

== See also ==
- Chernobyl disaster § Flora, fauna, and funga
- Radioresistance, the ability of an organism to withstand ionizing radiation
- Extremophile, an organism able to live in an extreme environment
- Nylon-eating bacteria
- Plastivore
- Project Hail Mary - a sci-fi novel where a fictional astrophage feeds on electromagnetic radiation
