= Paenarthrobacter nicotinovorans =

Scientific classification
- Domain: Bacteria
- Kingdom: Bacillati
- Phylum: Actinomycetota
- Class: Actinomycetes
- Order: Micrococcales
- Family: Micrococcaceae
- Genus: Paenarthrobacter
- Species: P. nicotinovorans

Binomial name
- Paenarthrobacter nicotinovorans (Kodama et al. 1992) Busse 2016

Type strain
- ATCC 49919; CIP 106990; DSM 420; IFO 15511; JCM 3874; LMG 16253; NBRC 15511; SAM 1563; VKM Ac-1988

Synonyms
- Arthrobacter nicotinovorans Kodama et al. 1992

Species of bacterium

Paenarthrobacter nicotinovorans is a Gram-positive and aerobic bacterium species from the genus Paenarthrobacter. This bacterium has the ability to degrade atrazine, nicotine, and creatine. and produces nicotine dehydrogenase

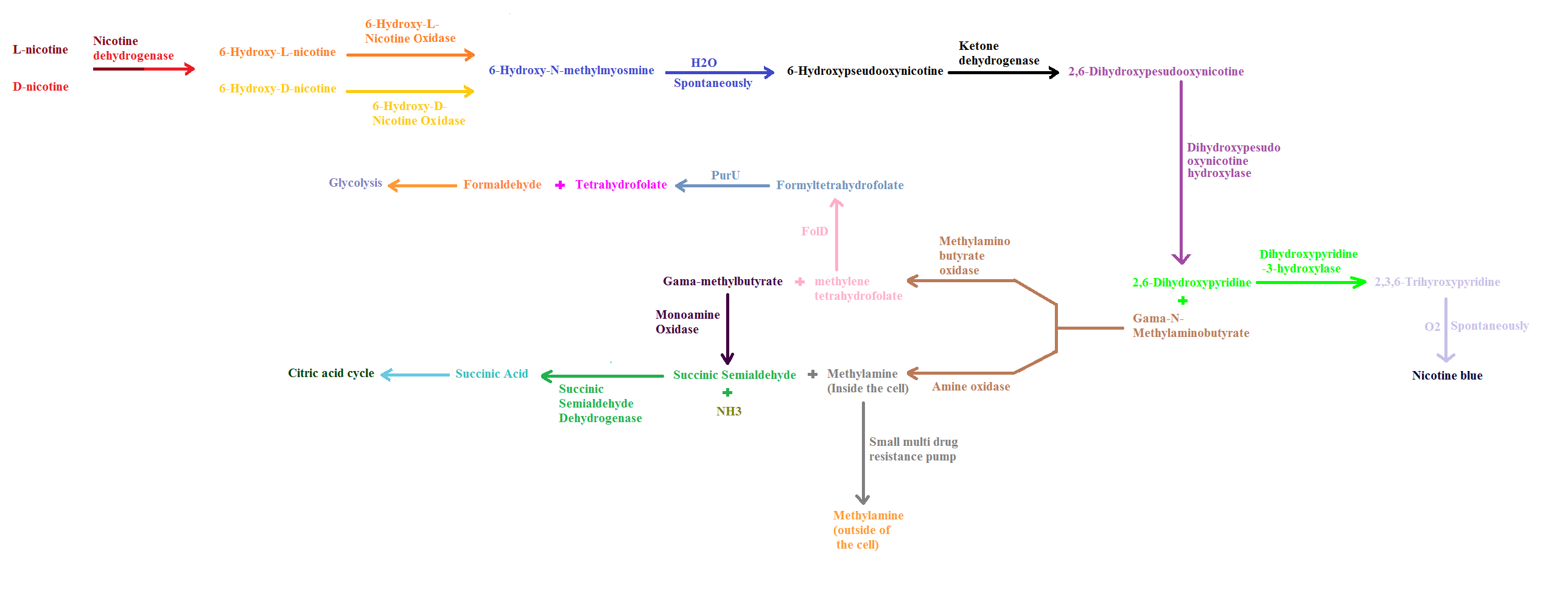
A map of nicotine metabolism originated from P. nicotinovorans plasmid pAO1
