= Star Trek: Discovery season 5 =

Star Trek: Discovery
- Season 5
- Promotional poster
- Showrunners: Alex Kurtzman; Michelle Paradise
- Starring: Sonequa Martin-Green; Doug Jones; Anthony Rapp; Mary Wiseman; Wilson Cruz; Blu del Barrio; Callum Keith Rennie; David Ajala; Tig Notaro
- No. of episodes: 10

Release
- Original network: Paramount+
- Original release: April 4 – May 30, 2024

Season chronology
- ← Previous; Season 4

The fifth and final season of the American television series Star Trek: Discovery follows the crew of the starship Discovery in the 32nd century, more than 900 years after Star Trek: The Original Series, on a galactic adventure to find a mysterious power that has been hidden for centuries and which other dangerous groups are also searching for. The season was produced by CBS Studios in association with Secret Hideout and Roddenberry Entertainment, with Alex Kurtzman and Michelle Paradise serving as showrunners.

Sonequa Martin-Green stars as Michael Burnham, captain of the Discovery, along with the returning Doug Jones, Anthony Rapp, Mary Wiseman, Wilson Cruz, Blu del Barrio, David Ajala, and Tig Notaro. They are joined by Callum Keith Rennie. Development on the season began by March 2020 so it could be filmed back-to-back with the fourth season, but these plans were altered by the COVID-19 pandemic. The fifth season was officially ordered in January 2022 and filming took place in Toronto, Ontario, Canada, from June to November. Paramount announced in March 2023 that the season would be the last for the series, and additional filming took place a month later so the series could be better concluded.

The season premiered on the streaming service Paramount+ on April 4, 2024, with its first two episodes. The other eight episodes were released weekly until May 30.

== Episodes ==
No. overall	No. in season	Title	Directed by	Written by	Original release date
56	1	"Red Directive"	Olatunde Osunsanmi	Michelle Paradise	April 4, 2024
In the 32nd century, Captain Michael Burnham and the crew of the USS Discovery are assigned a top-secret "red directive" mission by the mysterious Dr. Kovich to investigate an 800-year-old Romulan science vessel. Before they get there, couriers Moll and L'ak take something from the vessel. Kovich asks Cleveland "Book" Booker—formerly a courier and Burnham's romantic partner who is serving time for crimes against the United Federation of Planets—to help find Moll and L'ak, and he leads Discovery and the USS Antares to the planet Q'mau. There, Moll and L'ak meet with an android named Fred who reveals that the object is a Romulan puzzle box holding a journal. They kill Fred and flee. Burnham, Book, and Antares captain Rayner pursue the couriers and Rayner accidentally triggers an avalanche that threatens a nearby town. Burnham uses the shields on Discovery and Antares to save the town, allowing Moll and L'ak to escape. Later, Kovich reveals that the journal belongs to a team of 24th-century scientists who searched for the technology that the Progenitors used to seed the galaxy with life. (Note: As introduced in the Star Trek: The Next Generation episode "The Chase" (1993))
57	2	"Under the Twin Moons"	Doug Aarniokoski	Alan McElroy	April 4, 2024
Following his actions on Q'mau, Rayner is brought before a disciplinary hearing by Federation president Laira Rillak who believes that Rayner's recklessness is not suitable for Starfleet in peacetime. Using images of the journal that they retrieved from Fred's memory, Burnham and Discovery travel to the uninhabited burial planet of Lyrek where they believe the Progenitor technology, or a clue to it, is hidden. Burnham and her first officer Saru—on his last mission with Discovery before becoming a Federation ambassador so he can be closer to his fiancé, Ni'Var president T'Rina—transport down to Lyrek and disable an automated defense system using an electromagnetic pulse. Book contacts Moll and L'ak posing as a fellow courier and learns that Moll is Malinne, the daughter of his mentor and namesake Cleveland Booker IV. Burnham and Saru find a piece of a map, and they also determine that the couriers are on their way to Betazed when the next clue is actually on Trill. When Burnham learns that Rayner has been asked to resign from Starfleet, she offers him a second chance as her new first officer.
58	3	"Jinaal"	Andi Armaganian	Kyle Jarrow & Lauren Wilkinson	April 11, 2024
Saru struggles in his new world of politics, Rayner reluctantly gets to know the crew of Discovery, and Burnham travels to Trill with Book, Dr. Hugh Culber, and ensign Adira Tal who reunites with their boyfriend, Gray. The pair decide to break up due to their lives going in different directions. The team meet the host of a Trill symbiont, Bix, whose previous host Jinaal was a member of the 24th-century scientist team. Culber offers to have Jinaal's consciousness temporarily transferred to his body so Jinaal can take Burnham and Book to the next clue. He leads them into the wilderness where they are attacked by several large creatures. Realizing that the creatures are defending their nest, Book uses his empathic abilities to calm them. This convinces Jinaal that they can be trusted with finding the Progenitors' technology, explaining that the scientists hid the technology and the pieces of the map so it could not be found until someone worthy of that power went looking for it. He gives them his piece of the map and the coordinates for the next piece. Culber is left shaken by this shared-body experience.
59	4	"Face the Strange"	Lee Rose	Sean Cochran	April 18, 2024
Moll secretly tracks Discovery to Trill and plants a time bug, a weapon left over from the Temporal Wars, on Adira. When Discovery arrives at the coordinates of the next clue, the time bug activates and traps them in a cycle of jumping through time. Burnham and Rayner were transporting when the time bug activated and were left aware of what happened, while chief engineer Paul Stamets is also aware of what is happening due to his unique DNA. The three jump through various periods of the ship's history, including when it was under construction, fighting the malevolent AI Control, traveling from the 23rd century to the 32nd, being hijacked by Osyraa, and a possible future where Moll and L'ak have found the Progenitors' technology and it has been used by the Breen to devastate the Federation. Jumping to a few weeks after Burnham first boarded Discovery, she convinces the crew to help her, Rayner, and Stamets break the cycle and return to the correct time, confronting her mutinous younger self in the process. Being stuck in the time cycle gives Moll and L'ak a six hour head-start on the next clue.
60	5	"Mirrors"	Jen McGowan	Johanna Lee & Carlos Cisco	April 25, 2024
Moll and L'ak have entered an unstable wormhole. Burnham and Book enter in a shuttle and find the debris of Moll and L'ak's ship next to the ISS Enterprise, an alternate version of the USS Enterprise from the Mirror Universe. The ship was brought to this universe by refugees escaping the ruthless Terran Empire, and one of the refugees went on to join the 24th-century scientist team. She hid her piece of the map on the ship, which Burnham retrieves along with the next clue. Book attempts to reason with Moll using his connection to her father, but she is unconvinced because her father abandoned her as a child. Burnham and Book appeal to Moll and L'ak's love for one another, but L'ak reveals that there is an "erigah" bounty on them because he betrayed his people, the Breen, to be with Moll. They hope to sell the Progenitors' technology to escape the bounty and move to a peaceful colony in the Gamma Quadrant. Moll accidentally detaches the shuttle, forcing Burnham and Book to pilot the Enterprise out of the wormhole with help from Rayner and the Discovery crew. Moll and L'ak escape in a warp pod.
61	6	"Whistlespeak"	Chris Byrne	Kenneth Lin & Brandon Schultz	May 2, 2024
Kovich identifies the five scientists who hid the map pieces, allowing Discovery to determine that the next clue is pointing to a Denobulan weather tower on Halem'no which holds off deadly sandstorms and provides rain. The tower is concealed as a mountain to hide the advanced technology from the Halem'nites, a pre-warp society that should not be interfered with per Starfleet's Prime Directive. Burnham and Sylvia Tilly join the Halem'nites in disguise. With help from Adira, Burnham repairs the tower's malfunctioning control panel while Tilly participates in a race to gain access to the tower. She and one of the Halem'nites, Ravah, win the race and are locked inside the tower as sacrifices to the Halem'nite gods. Burnham violates the Prime Directive to free them and reveal to the Halem'nites that the tower is advanced technology which requires no sacrifice. They retrieve the map piece and next clue, before being informed that Moll and L'ak have been found. Meanwhile, Culber receives help from Stamets and Book as he struggles to come to terms with the impact of the shared-body experience on his spirituality.
62	7	"Erigah"	Jon Dudkowski	M. Raven Metzner	May 9, 2024
Culber attempts to treat L'ak, who was injured in the Enterprise confrontation, but is unfamiliar with Breen physiology. Primarch Ruhn, the leader of a Breen faction, arrives at Federation Headquarters to retrieve L'ak, who reveals that he is Ruhn's nephew and a direct descendant of the former Breen Emperor; Ruhn wishes to use L'ak to legitimize his own claim to the throne. Rayner reveals his past as the survivor of a Breen occupation that killed his entire family, and Burnham uses this information to convince Ruhn that taking L'ak would cause further conflict with other Breen factions. L'ak overdoses in a failed attempt to help Moll escape custody. Breen medics help him at Burnham's request, but L'ak dies and Ruhn declares war on the Federation. Moll reveals to him their search for the Progenitors' technology, which she hopes can be used to resurrect L'ak. Ruhn takes her with him, putting Discovery in a race with the Breen to find the technology. Stamets, Book, Tilly, Adira, and engineer Jett Reno determine that the next clue points to the "Eternal Gallery and Archive" in the Badlands region of space.
63	8	"Labyrinths"	Emmanuel Osei-Kuffour	Lauren Wilkinson & Eric J. Robbins	May 16, 2024
Upon Discovery's arrival at the Archive, archivist Hy'Rell leads Burnham to the manuscript purported to contain the last map piece. She also gives Book a cutting of the World Root, a priceless piece of his culture following the destruction of his planet. Burnham is transported into a mindscape simulation where she is tested for her worthiness to find the Progenitors' technology by an AI, in the form of Book, while Book and Rayner fight off attacking Breen forces. Burnham eventually admits that she's driven by her fears of failure and loss, passing the AI's test and earning the location of the map piece. She is also given additional information on how to access the technology once at the map's destination. After Discovery copies the completed map, Burnham gives it to Ruhn in exchange for a promise not to destroy the Archive. The Breen fire on Discovery and Burnham fakes the ship's destruction. Ruhn decides to destroy the Archive anyway, concerning some of his followers. Moll takes advantage of this discontent and stages a mutiny, killing Ruhn and uniting his forces behind her plan to resurrect L'ak.
64	9	"Lagrange Point"	Jonathan Frakes	Sean Cochran & Ari Friedman	May 23, 2024
Discovery arrives at the location of the Progenitors' technology and finds a structure at the Lagrange point between two primordial black holes. Moll and the Breen also arrive and capture the structure. Burnham plans a heist to retrieve the structure from Moll's dreadnaught, while the Breen discover a portal inside the structure. Having learned of Ruhn's death, Primarch Tahal—another Breen leader who is responsible for the death of Rayner's family—sets out to claim Ruhn's forces for her own; Saru volunteers to intercept Tahal's forces in hopes of stalling them and giving Discovery time to retrieve the technology. Burnham secretly boards the dreadnaught with Book, Adira, and tactical officer Gen Rhys. Rhys protects Adira as they take down the dreadnaught's shields while Burnham and Book secure the structure and discuss their relationship. When they are discovered, Burnham has Discovery ram the shuttle bay which begins pulling everything into space. Moll, carrying L'ak's body in a portable pattern buffer, and Burnham enter the portal before it is pulled into space and released from the structure.
65	10	"Life, Itself"	Olatunde Osunsanmi	Kyle Jarrow & Michelle Paradise	May 30, 2024
The portal takes Burnham and Moll to a higher-dimension structure where Burnham convinces Moll to work together. Book and Culber hold the portal with a shuttle's tractor beam using knowledge Culber inherited from Jinaal, and Saru convinces Tahal to stay away though she sends a scout ship to investigate. Burnham accesses the technology and connects with the consciousness of a Progenitor who explains that she is free to use the technology but it cannot bring L'ak back to life. Burnham leaves with Moll as the Discovery crew use their unique spore-based propulsion system to send the Breen dreadnought and Tahal's scout ship to the edge of the galaxy. Burnham decides that no one should control the Progenitors' technology and releases the portal into one of the black holes. Weeks later, the crew attend Saru and T'Rina's wedding where Burnham and Book affirm their love for one another and accept a new mission from Kovich, who reveals himself to be the time-traveling operative Agent Daniels; he also plans to offer Moll a job. Years later, Burnham and Book have a son, Leto, who is a new Starfleet captain. Burnham, now an admiral, takes Discovery—which is restored to its 23rd century appearance—to a specific location where its sentient computer Zora will wait for a long time as part of a new red directive mission. (Note: Setting up the events of the Star Trek: Short Treks companion short "Calypso" (2018))

== Cast and characters ==
=== Main ===
- Sonequa Martin-Green as Michael Burnham
- Doug Jones as Saru
- Anthony Rapp as Paul Stamets
- Mary Wiseman as Sylvia Tilly
- Wilson Cruz as Hugh Culber
- Blu del Barrio as Adira Tal
- Callum Keith Rennie as Rayner
- David Ajala as Cleveland "Book" Booker
- Tig Notaro as Jett Reno

=== Recurring ===
- Oded Fehr as Charles Vance
- David Cronenberg as Kovich
- Annabelle Wallis as the voice of Zora
- Tara Rosling as T'Rina
- Eve Harlow as Moll
- Elias Toufexis as L'ak

=== Notable guests ===
- Chelah Horsdal as Laira Rillak
- Ian Alexander as Gray Tal
- Hannah Cheesman as Airiam
- Rachael Ancheril as Nhan

== Production ==
=== Development ===
Development on a fifth season of Star Trek: Discovery had begun by March 2020, when work was taking place on the fourth season, to allow the two seasons to be filmed back-to-back, but these plans were altered by the COVID-19 pandemic. In October, executive producer and co-showrunner Alex Kurtzman said there were "years and years left on Discovery" and noted the precedent of several previous Star Trek series running for seven seasons each. A 10-episode fifth season was officially ordered by Paramount+ in January 2022, with the episode count reduced from previous seasons to align it with the service's other Star Trek series. In March 2023, Paramount announced that the season would be the last for the series, which came as a surprise to the cast and crew. The decision came amid cost cutting for Paramount's streaming content.

=== Writing ===
Kurtzman stated in October 2020 that all seasons after the third would continue to be set in the 32nd century. Co-showrunner Michelle Paradise indicated in August 2021 that writing for the fifth season was yet to begin. The writers were in "full swing" by March 2022, working simultaneously with post-production on the fourth season, and some scripts had been written for the fifth season by the time the fourth season finale was released on March 17. Paradise was working on the script for the season finale by late August 2022, and completed it on September 12.

Executive producer and producing director Olatunde Osunsanmi said the fifth season would take more inspiration for its themes and storytelling approach from Star Trek: The Original Series and Star Trek: The Next Generation than the previous seasons did, and would feature "more exploration and more adventure". Frequent Star Trek director Jonathan Frakes said the season had an action-adventure style inspired by the Indiana Jones franchise rather than the "heavy emo" tone of the fourth season, and he indicated that this change was a mandate from the studios that the showrunners and cast had embraced; the cast and crew referred to it as "the adventure season". The season's story follows the USS Discovery on a galactic adventure to find a mysterious power that has been hidden for centuries and which other dangerous groups are also searching for.

=== Casting ===
The season stars the returning Sonequa Martin-Green as Michael Burnham, Doug Jones as Saru, Anthony Rapp as Paul Stamets, Mary Wiseman as Sylvia Tilly, Wilson Cruz as Hugh Culber, Blu del Barrio as Adira Tal, David Ajala as Cleveland "Book" Booker, and Tig Notaro as Jett Reno. They are joined by Callum Keith Rennie as Rayner, a war-time Starfleet captain struggling to adjust to peace. Rennie's casting was announced in October 2022, alongside recurring guests Eve Harlow and Elias Toufexis as outlaw couple Moll and L'ak. Also returning from earlier seasons are Oded Fehr as Charles Vance, David Cronenberg as Kovich, Annabelle Wallis as the voice of Zora, Tara Rosling as T'Rina, Chelah Horsdal as Laira Rillak, Ian Alexander as Gray Tal, Hannah Cheesman as Airiam, and Rachael Ancheril as Nhan.

=== Filming ===
The series is filmed at Pinewood Toronto Studios in Toronto, Canada. Pre-production on the season began by March 2022. Osunsanmi said the season would continue to use the video wall that was built for virtual production on the fourth season, and the crew would take advantage of lessons learned about the technology the first time they used it. Filming for the fifth season began on June 13, 2022, and wrapped on November 20. Frakes directed the first half of the finale and Osunsanmi directed the second half. Osunsami did two or three days of additional filming in April 2023 to update the season's last episode so it could better serve as a series finale. Paradise said they did not need to make any changes to the rest of the season and felt audiences who did not know they made these changes would believe that the season was always intended to be the final one.

=== Music ===
A soundtrack album for the season featuring selections from composer Jeff Russo's score was released digitally by Lakeshore Records on October 18, 2024. All music by Jeff Russo:

Original Series Soundtrack: Season 5
No.	Title	Length
1.	"Space Action"	1:15
2.	"Tipsy Tilly"	2:01
3.	"Moll and Lak Visit Fred"	2:54
4.	"Back Me Up"	2:46
5.	"Battle Mol and Lak"	1:48
6.	"Warp Bubble"	3:13
7.	"On Qmau"	1:03
8.	"Eyes Peeled"	1:09
9.	"Last Dance"	1:17
10.	"Battle with Drones"	2:43
11.	"Sarus Solution"	2:07
12.	"Blow Up Head"	2:51
13.	"New First Officer"	1:28
14.	"Trouble in Paradise"	1:27
15.	"Jinaal's Story"	2:24
16.	"Grey and Adira Breakup"	2:03
17.	"Life Is a Journey"	2:44
18.	"Time Bug"	3:37
19.	"Through the Wormhole"	2:51
20.	"Shuttle Gone"	1:26
21.	"Shape Your Future"	2:53
22.	"Sickbay Standoff"	1:32
23.	"Flashback 2 Green Eye"	2:18
24.	"Lak Injured"	4:08
25.	"Culber's Abuela"	1:52
26.	"Concerned Father"	2:01
27.	"Test of Thirst"	2:22
28.	"Are There No Gods"	3:14
29.	"Massive Responsibility"	3:24
30.	"Lak Is Fading"	1:38
31.	"Message from Breen"	1:49
32.	"Facing Breen"	4:00
33.	"Medics Arrive"	3:51
34.	"Let Moll Go"	2:22
35.	"Into the Badlands"	2:00
36.	"You Fail You Die"	2:39
37.	"Engineering Figures It Out"	2:20
38.	"Complete the Map"	1:46
39.	"Dual Back Holes"	2:18
40.	"Getting to Shuttle Bay"	1:40
41.	"Distraction"	2:42
42.	"Rayner Takes Command"	2:16
43.	"Think Like Progenitors"	1:24
44.	"Meeting Progenitor"	2:48
45.	"Michael the Steward"	2:46
46.	"Michael Returns"	2:18
47.	"Saru's Wedding"	3:38
48.	"True Love"	3:13
49.	"Happy Family"	2:04
50.	"Jump Breen"	2:33
51.	"Just Let It Go"	2:42
52.	"Advice for Son"	3:03
53.	"Goodbye to Crew – Farewell Discovery"	5:42
54.	"Season 5 End Credits"	0:59
55.	"The Map"	2:25
Total length:		2:13:47

== Marketing ==
To celebrate "Star Trek Day" on September 8, 2022, a video of Cruz giving a set tour during the filming of the season's fourth episode was released. The season was promoted during the "Star Trek Universe" panel at New York Comic Con in October, with Rapp and Cruz discussing the season alongside executive producers Kurtzman, Paradise, and Rod Roddenberry. Martin-Green joined the panel virtually from set to present a teaser trailer for the season which introduced major new cast members. Justin Carter of Gizmodo said the teaser was short and appeared to be primarily influenced by Indiana Jones. Samantha Coley at Collider said the teaser did not reveal much about the plot but she felt it had a "strong undercurrent of delight" that the fourth season did not. Coley said this could be the most fun season since the inclusion of Christopher Pike in the second season.

With the announcement that this would be the final season, Paramount said there would be events around the world to celebrate the series over the next year. However, cast and crew were unable to be involved in marketing during the 2023 Writers Guild of America strike, which began in May 2023, and the 2023 SAG-AFTRA strike, which began in July. Paramount released an extended clip from the season, introducing its new recurring characters, at the Star Trek Universe panel at San Diego Comic-Con in late July; the panel did not include cast or crew members. Kurtzman briefly discussed the season at a Star Trek Universe panel at New York Comic Con in October, soon after the writers strike ended, but the panel primarily focused on projects that were not impacted by the strikes. The SAG-AFTRA strike ended in November, allowing the cast to participate in marketing moving forward. Later that month, Martin-Green discussed the series at a "Women in Sci-Fi" panel at Fan Expo: San Francisco. She promoted the series with Paradise at CCXP in December, where another clip was released.

A full trailer for the season was released during IGN Fan Fest in February 2024. Martin-Green, Jones, Cruz, and Rapp discussed the series as part of the event. Cheryl Eddy at Gizmodo highlighted the trailer's focus on "farewells", while John Orquiola of Screen Rant noted the trailer's focusing on the season's new characters. The season's first episode premiered at SXSW in mid-March, and was also shown at WonderCon at the end of the month. Paradise discussed the series at both events with different members of the cast and crew; Cruz, who was unable to return for the additional filming, said marketing the series with the cast was cathartic.

== Release ==
=== Streaming and broadcast ===
The season was originally set to premiere on Paramount+ in the United States in early 2023, but this was delayed when the season was revealed to be the series' last. It premiered on April 4, 2024, with its first two episodes. The other eight episodes were released weekly. Paramount+ also released the season in the UK, Switzerland, South Korea, Latin America, Germany, France, Italy, Australia, Austria, and Canada. It was released in New Zealand by TVNZ, in Greece by Cosmote TV, and in other countries by SkyShowtime (a combination of Paramount+ and Peacock for some of Europe), and was broadcast in Canada on the CTV Sci-Fi Channel.

=== Home media ===
The season was released on DVD, Blu-ray, and Limited Edition Blu-ray Steelbook formats in the U.S. on August 27, 2024. The release includes nearly two hours of bonus features, including an audio commentary, a deleted scene, a gag reel, and various featurettes on the making of the season.

A complete series box set with an extra bonus disc was also released.

== Reception ==
=== Critical response ===
The review aggregator website Rotten Tomatoes reported 80% approval based on 20 reviews. The website's critical consensus reads, "Lightening up just in time for one last voyage, Star Trek: Discovery concludes with a quest that sends this particular crew off in rousing fashion." Collider named the season one of the most anticipated series of 2024.

=== Accolades ===
Year	Award	Category	Recipient	Result	Ref.
2024	Black Reel TV Awards	Outstanding Lead Performance in a Drama Series	Sonequa Martin-Green	Nominated	
2024	Hollywood Professional Association Awards	Outstanding Color Grading – Live Action Episode or Non-Theatrical Feature	Todd Bochner (for "Red Directive")	Nominated	
2024	Hollywood Professional Association Awards	Outstanding Visual Effects – Live Action Episode or Series Season	Aleksandra Kochoska Dekovic, Brian Tatosky, Charles Collyer, Chelsea Wynne, and Shawn Ewashko	Nominated	
2025	GLAAD Media Awards	Outstanding Drama Series	Star Trek: Discovery	Nominated	
2025	Saturn Awards	Best Science Fiction Television Series	Star Trek: Discovery	Nominated	
