= Exes & Ohs =

Television series

- Created by: Michelle Paradise
- Starring: Michelle Paradise; Marnie Alton; Megan Cavanagh; Angela Featherstone; Heather Matarazzo
- No. of seasons: 2
- No. of episodes: 14

Production
- Production locations: Vancouver, British Columbia, Canada
- Running time: 23 minutes per episode

Original release
- Network: LOGO (USA); Showcase (Canada)
- Release: October 8, 2007 – August 17, 2011

Exes & Ohs is an American and Canadian cable television series that launched on Logo on October 8, 2007, and Showcase in Canada. The show centres on the dating life of Jennifer (Michelle Paradise), a lesbian documentary filmmaker with a vivid fantasy life and a floundering career. Jennifer is looking for Ms. Right but must navigate the rules of lesbian dating life, most of which she learns the hard way. Her friends are there to help: Sam (Marnie Alton), a sexy lesbian with a fear of commitment; Chris (Megan Cavanagh) and Kris (Angela Featherstone), a lesbian couple expanding both their pet accessory business and their family; and Crutch (Heather Matarazzo), a young musician who wants to be taken seriously but still has some growing up to do.

The series is based on the short film The Ten Rules: A Lesbian Survival Guide, created and written by Michelle Paradise, and directed by Lee Friedlander. It was shot in Vancouver, British Columbia, Canada, but is set in Seattle.

The show's second season was pushed back various times. AfterEllen stated that it would not premiere until 2010. It was later set to premiere on June 29, 2011.

== Cast ==
=== Main ===
- Michelle Paradise as Jennifer
- Marnie Alton as Sam
- Megan Cavanagh as Chris
- Angela Featherstone as Kris
- Heather Matarazzo as Crutch
- Jennifer Spence as Devin

=== Recurring ===
- Chelah Horsdalas Lauren Brooks
- Darby Stanchfield as Sienna
- Amy Dudgeon as Emmy Beever
- Stacy Grant as Elizabeth

=== Guest stars ===
- Sheryl Lee Ralph as Rev Ruby
- Sonja Bennett as Kate
- Karen Holness as Corrine
- Linnea Sharple as Charlie
- Cathy DeBuono as Becca

== Season 1 ==
Episode #	Title	Description
101	"There Must Be Rules..."	Jennifer struggles to move on when she gets trapped on a yacht where her ex-girlfriend is getting married. She decides to take her friend's advice to get over her ex by getting some action of her own.
102	"Roads Previously Not Taken"	Chris and Kris try to find homes for stray animals when they come to a startling realization. Jennifer gets back in the dating game at Sam's urging.
103	"Cutthroat"	A friendly competition over a girl between Sam and Jennifer brings up unresolved problems from their romantic past. Chris and Kris experiment with a doggie bakery and are daunted by the responsibility of parenting, while Crutch looks for a place to live.
104	"Love, Money and a Six Olive Martini"	Jennifer finds a sponsor for her documentary, but this sponsor is interested in more than just a film. As Crutch interviews for a better-paying job, Sam confronts her dad about his discomfort with her homosexuality.
105	"Pole Dancing and Other Forms of Therapy"	After taking a pole-dancing class, Jennifer feels less inhibited in other aspects of her life. Meanwhile, Chris and Kris search for the ideal man to father their child and Crutch guides a fan discovering her sexuality.
106	"What Goes Around..."	A new, extreme Jennifer tells off her ex after Sienna shows up looking for sympathy, but Sienna doesn't go away quite that easily. While Chris and Kris get inseminated, Sam matures through therapy and Crutch finds fans in unexpected people.

== Season 2 ==
Episode #	Title	Description
201	"Fish In A Barrel"	Jen is haunted by exes in her dreams and tries speed dating to get her love life back on track.
202	"Two Bridge Girls and a Pair of Bunz"	Sam and Kris get new jobs and Jen struggles to date two women at once.
203	"The Big 'O'"	Chris and Kris' mom bond over pot smoking, Jen is on a frantic search for her missing sex tape and Sam has trouble oragasming.
204	"Girl-Frogs & Wet T-Shirts"	Sam hosts a lesbian wet t-shirt contest to save her job, Jen starts teaching at college, and Chris and Kris get their sex life back on track.
205	"Everything Changes"	Jen tries to be friends with Gillian after their breakup. Sam argues with Elizabeth before sharing an intimate moment with Jen.
206	"The Happy Homemaker vs. The Cougar"	Kris proposes to Chris. Jen tries dating a younger woman. Elizabeth finds out about Jen and Sam's kiss.
207	"I Do. Do I?"	Chris and Kris get married. Sam confesses her feelings to Jen.
208	"Sleepless in Seattle"	Kris tries to induce labour while Sam and Jen try to come to terms with their feelings for each other.

== Reception ==
Dulci Pitagora of GO praised Exes & Ohs, writing, "This show is designed to make you laugh with the kind of drama only a group of five lesbians can deliver." Jessica Stites of The Advocate said Exes & Ohs surpasses the lesbian drama television series The L Word in three ways: its "catchy" song "The Constant Lover" from the band Magneta Lane, the cast's being open about which characters are attracted to women, and its being "the first lesbian TV show to be intentionally funny". The television series was reviewed by the Washington Blade.
