= Michelle Paradise =

American writer, producer, and actress

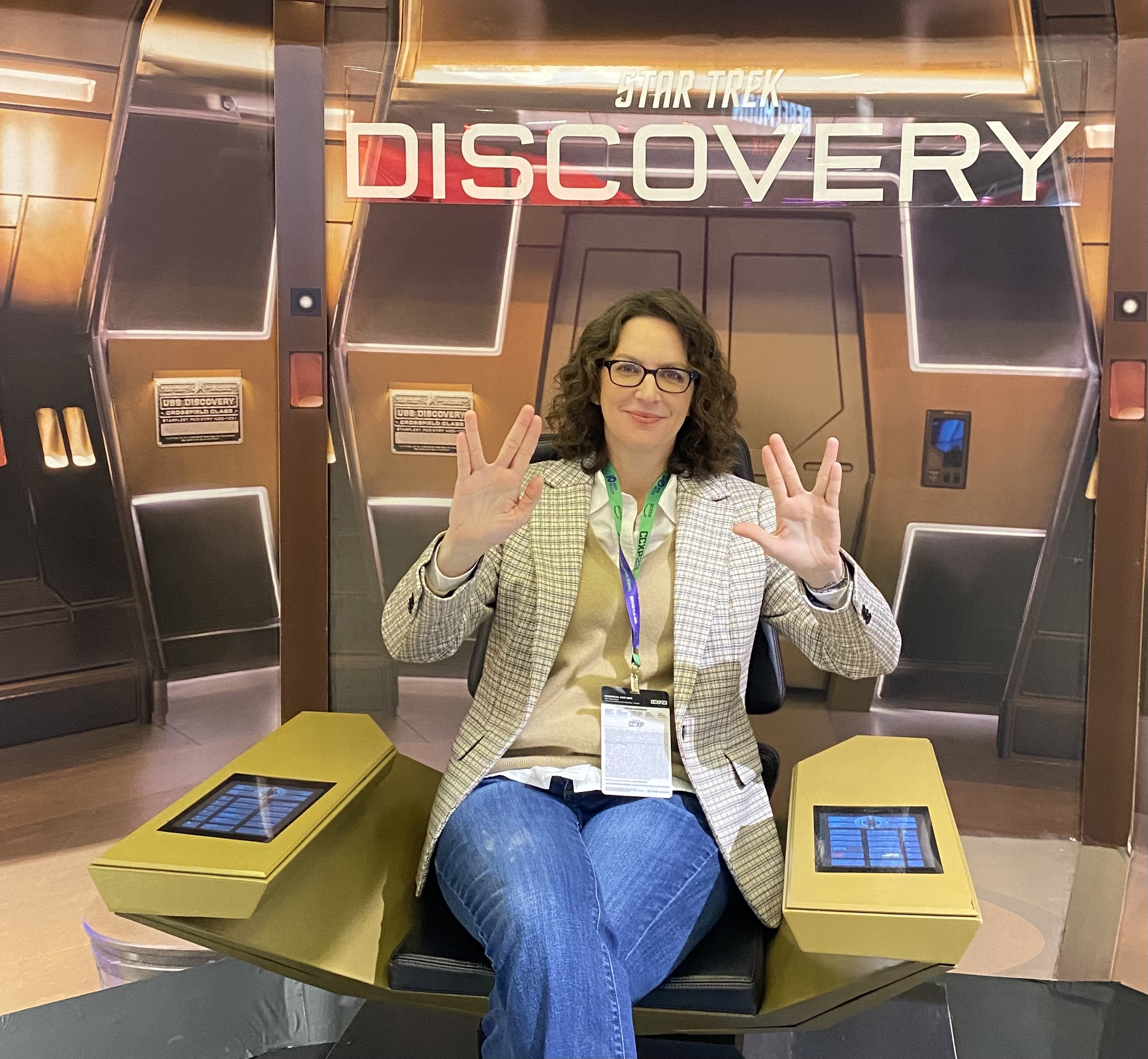
- Education: Brigham Young University; San Francisco State University
- Occupations: Writer, producer, actress

Michelle Paradise is an American writer, producer and actress. She created, wrote and starred in the short film The Ten Rules and the television series Exes and Ohs, and subsequently became a writer and producer for the television series The Originals and Star Trek: Discovery.

== Early work ==
Paradise wrote, produced and starred in the short film The Ten Rules: The Lesbian Survival Guide, which debuted in 2002 and subsequently played at gay and lesbian film festivals, both in the United States and in Europe (specifically Copenhagen, Paris and Reykjavík). The film, which focused on a group of lesbian friends in Los Angeles, won awards at the Boulder Gay & Lesbian Film Festival, the Verzaubert International Gay & Lesbian Film Festival, the Austin Gay & Lesbian Film Festival and the Philadelphia International Gay & Lesbian Film Festival.

After the success of The Ten Rules, Paradise developed the themes of the film into a television series for Logo, Exes and Ohs. Paradise wrote, produced and starred in the series, which debuted on October 8, 2007. Unusually, she developed, produced and sold Exes and Ohs without an agent. Exes and Ohs ran for two seasons.

Paradise also appeared in the short film "Black Road" (2002), the film Heart of the Beholder (2005) and the television series George Lopez (2005) and Rodney (2006). On stage, she performed improv comedy with the Groundlings, Second City and the Gay Mafia, and played lead roles at the Bitter Truth Theater, Theatre Rhinoceros, the Berkman Theater and the Little Theater Group.

== TV staff writer ==
In April 2011, Paradise completed the Warner Bros. Writers' Workshop. She was one of nine finalists for the workshop, out of over 1,300 applicants. In 2013, she became a staff writer on the CW series The Originals, a spin-off of The Vampire Diaries. She was credited as an executive story editor in the series' first season, as a co-producer in its second, a producer in its third, supervising producer in its fourth, and co-executive producer in its fifth and final season. Paradise wrote or co-wrote 15 episodes of The Originals, over its 5-year run.

After the completion of The Originals, Paradise joined the writing staff of the CBS All Access series Star Trek: Discovery as a co-executive producer in its second season, which started airing in January 2019. She wrote the episode "Project Daedalus", and co-wrote the two-part season finale "Such Sweet Sorrow" with Jenny Lumet and series executive producer Alex Kurtzman, who was also showrunner in Discovery's second season. In February 2019, Paradise was promoted to executive producer of the series for its third season, which premiered in 2020.

== Personal life ==
Paradise was born in San Diego. She has bachelor's degrees in English and French from Brigham Young University and a master's degree in comparative literature from San Francisco State University. At BYU she was a member of the Church of Jesus Christ of Latter-day Saints; she told an interviewer, "I was Mormon for about seven years and pretty much left the church after graduation ... all for reasons that are pretty personal." In 2007, POWER UP named Paradise one of its "10 Amazing Gay Women in Showbiz".
