= Star Trek: The Next Generation season 7 =

1993–94 season of American television series

Star Trek: The Next Generation
- Season 7
- Region A/1 Blu-ray cover art
- No. of episodes: 26

Release
- Original network: Broadcast syndication
- Original release: September 20, 1993 – May 23, 1994

Season chronology
- ← Previous; Season 6

The seventh and final season of the American science fiction television series Star Trek: The Next Generation commenced airing in broadcast syndication in the United States on September 20, 1993, and concluded on May 23, 1994, after airing 26 episodes. Set in the 24th century, the series follows the adventures of the crew of the Starfleet starship Enterprise-D.

The season begins with the crew defeating Lore and his group of rogue Borg, resulting in the disassembly of Lore. It continued this theme of family history with most of the episodes. After dealing with Lore, Data also confronts the realization that his "mother" is still alive ("Inheritance"). In "Interface", Geordi attempts to save his mother from a damaged ship and is forced to deal with his loss. Worf meets a future version of his son, Alexander, in "Firstborn" and his foster brother in "Homeward".

Both Troi and Dr. Crusher confront old family secrets in "Dark Page" and "Sub Rosa". Picard also faces challenges with a son he never knew he had in "Bloodlines" and his relationship with his family – past, present, and future – in the series finale "All Good Things..."

The series ends with Q concluding his trial of humanity, giving Picard an opportunity to save all of humankind.

This season was nominated for a Primetime Emmy Award for Outstanding Drama Series. As of 2026, this is the only time a syndicated series has been nominated for the award.

== Cast ==
- Patrick Stewart as Captain Jean-Luc Picard
- Jonathan Frakes as Commander William T. Riker
- Brent Spiner as Lt. Cmdr. Data
- Gates McFadden as Dr. (Cmdr.) Beverly Crusher
- LeVar Burton as Lt. Cmdr. Geordi La Forge
- Marina Sirtis as Counselor (Lt. Cmdr./Cmdr.) Deanna Troi
- Michael Dorn as Lt. Worf

== Recurring characters ==
- Majel Barrett – Computer Voice (6 episodes) / Lwaxana Troi (1 episode)
- Patti Yasutake – Ensign Alyssa Ogawa (4 episodes)
- Denise Crosby – Lt. Tasha Yar (2 episodes)
- Colm Meaney – Miles O'Brien (2 episodes)
- Wil Wheaton – Wesley Crusher (2 episodes)
- John de Lancie – Q (2 episodes)
- Michelle Forbes – Lt. Ro Laren (1 episode)
- Dwight Schultz – Lt. Reginald Barclay (1 episode)
- Eric Menyuk – The Traveler (1 episode)
- Brian Bonsall – Alexander Rozhenko (1 episode)
- Armin Shimerman – Quark (1 episode)

== Episodes ==
In the following table, episodes are listed by the order in which they aired.

No. overall	No. in season	Title	Directed by	Written by	Original release date	Prod. code	Nielsen rating
153	1	"Descent, Part II"	Alexander Singer	René Echevarria	September 20, 1993	253	13.0
The Borg are being led by Lore. Data falls under his control by being fed negative emotions.
154	2	"Liaisons"	Cliff Bole	Story by : Roger Eschbacher & Jaq Greenspon; Teleplay by : Jeanne Carrigan-Fauci & Lisa Rich	September 27, 1993	254	12.2
Worf and Troi reluctantly play host to two Iyaaran ambassadors while Picard crashes in a shuttle with another Iyaaran. He is rescued by a human female who exhibits strange behavior.
155	3	"Interface"	Robert Wiemer	Joe Menosky	October 4, 1993	255	11.7
Geordi tries to rescue his mother's starship via a remotely controlled probe.
156	4	"Gambit"	Peter Lauritson	Story by : Naren Shankar and Christopher Hatton; Teleplay by : Naren Shankar	October 11, 1993	256	11.9
157	5	"Gambit"	Alexander Singer	Story by : Naren Shankar; Teleplay by : Ronald D. Moore	October 18, 1993	257	12.0
Part 1: The Enterprise crew investigate the apparent murder of Captain Picard during an archaeological trip. Riker is kidnapped by mercenaries and finds Picard working as part of their crew. Part 2: Picard and Riker help mercenaries collect archaeological artifacts to prevent an ancient Vulcan weapon from falling into the wrong hands.
158	6	"Phantasms"	Patrick Stewart	Brannon Braga	October 25, 1993	258	12.2
Data experiences strange dreams while the Enterprise has issues with its renewed warp core. But all is not as it seems.
159	7	"Dark Page"	Les Landau	Hilary J. Bader	November 1, 1993	259	11.6
A psychic breakdown puts Lwaxana Troi in a coma and Deanna works to save her life. This episode features a young Kirsten Dunst playing the little girl Hedril.
160	8	"Attached"	Jonathan Frakes	Nick Sagan (Note: Credited as Nicholas Sagan)	November 8, 1993	260	12.1
Reclusive aliens imprison Picard and Dr. Crusher on charges of espionage. Experimental implants linking their minds telepathically cause them to face their latent feelings for each other.
161	9	"Force of Nature"	Robert Lederman	Naren Shankar	November 15, 1993	261	11.9
A pair of scientists show that warp drive is harming the fabric of space while the Enterprise investigates a Federation ship's disappearance.
162	10	"Inheritance"	Robert Scheerer	Story by : Dan Koeppel; Teleplay by : Dan Koeppel and René Echevarria	November 22, 1993	262	11.6
Data encounters a woman claiming to be his "mother" while the Enterprise assists an alien planet in re-stabilizing their planet's core.
163	11	"Parallels"	Robert Wiemer	Brannon Braga	November 29, 1993	263	12.8
Worf finds himself randomly shifting between alternate realities, after winning a tournament and celebrating his birthday.
164	12	"The Pegasus"	LeVar Burton	Ronald D. Moore	January 10, 1994	264	11.9
Riker's former Captain boards the Enterprise to retrieve the USS Pegasus. Picard investigates the circumstances of its loss and finds that there has been a cover-up. Features Terry O'Quinn as Admiral Eric Pressman.
165	13	"Homeward"	Alexander Singer	Story by : Spike Steingasser; Teleplay by : Naren Shankar	January 17, 1994	265	11.8
A civilization doomed to extinction is saved by a Federation observer – Worf's human foster brother – in violation of the Prime Directive, forcing the Enterprise crew to actively determine their fate. Based upon material by William N. Stape.
166	14	"Sub Rosa"	Jonathan Frakes	Story by : Jeri Taylor; Teleplay by : Brannon Braga	January 31, 1994	266	11.5
Dr. Crusher attends her grandmother's funeral and finds that the house is inhabited by a spirit who is 800 years old, and was her grandmother's lover. Based upon material by Jeanna F. Gallo.
167	15	"Lower Decks"	Gabrielle Beaumont	Story by : Ronald Wilkerson & Jean Louise Matthias; Teleplay by : René Echevarria	February 7, 1994	267	11.9
Junior officers buck for promotion as one of them is assigned the dangerous task of helping a Cardassian spy.
168	16	"Thine Own Self"	Winrich Kolbe	Story by : Christopher Hatton; Teleplay by : Ronald D. Moore	February 14, 1994	268	11.4
Data loses his memory after retrieving radioactive fragments on a planet's surface and endangers the humanoid settlement he encounters, while Deanna studies to become a bridge officer.
169	17	"Masks"	Robert Wiemer	Joe Menosky	February 21, 1994	269	11.8
The Enterprise finds an ancient library that recreates its civilization by taking possession of Data and transforming the ship.
170	18	"Eye of the Beholder"	Cliff Bole	Story by : Brannon Braga; Teleplay by : René Echevarria	February 28, 1994	270	13.3
Deanna investigates the suicide of a crewman and uncovers a murder that took place during construction of the Enterprise.
171	19	"Genesis"	Gates McFadden	Brannon Braga	March 21, 1994	271	11.3
A routine medical treatment inadvertently creates a virus that begins to de-evolve the Enterprise crew while Picard and Data are on an away mission. This is the first and only episode to be directed by Gates McFadden, who plays Dr. Crusher.
172	20	"Journey's End"	Corey Allen	Ronald D. Moore	March 28, 1994	272	11.9
Wesley considers his future as the Enterprise is ordered to remove Native Americans from a planet that is about to fall under Cardassian jurisdiction. Guest stars Richard Poe as Gul Evek, Wil Wheaton as Wesley Crusher and Tom Jackson as Lakanta. Final appearance of Eric Menyuk as The Traveler. Based upon material by Shawn Piller and Antonia Napoli.
173	21	"Firstborn"	Jonathan West	Story by : Mark Kalbfeld; Teleplay by : René Echevarria	April 25, 1994	273	11.4
Worf attempts to convince his son Alexander to embrace his warrior heritage. Guest star James Sloyan as K'mtar.
174	22	"Bloodlines"	Les Landau	Nick Sagan	May 2, 1994	274	11.3
DaiMon Bok (guest star Lee Arenberg) returns to exact revenge on Picard by trying to kill the son Picard never knew he had.
175	23	"Emergence"	Cliff Bole	Story by : Brannon Braga; Teleplay by : Joe Menosky	May 9, 1994	275	11.3
The Enterprise becomes an emergent intelligence. It is discovered that the ship is creating a new life form via the holodeck characters.
176	24	"Preemptive Strike"	Patrick Stewart	Story by : Naren Shankar; Teleplay by : René Echevarria	May 16, 1994	276	11.8
Lieutenant Ro graduates from advanced tactical training and is sent by Picard to lure Maquis terrorists into a trap. Guest star Richard Poe as Gul Evek.
177	25	"All Good Things..."	Winrich Kolbe	Ronald D. Moore & Brannon Braga	May 23, 1994	277	17.4
178	26	"All Good Things..."	Winrich Kolbe	Ronald D. Moore & Brannon Braga	May 23, 1994	277	17.4
Picard finds himself being transported by Q between three time periods, to deal with a phenomenon that threatens to erase humanity from history.: Originally shown as a two-hour series finale, but in syndication is shown as 2 separate episodes.
