= Gambit (Star Trek: The Next Generation) =

- Star Trek: The Next Generation episodes
- Episode nos.: Season 7 Episodes 4 & 5
- Directed by: Peter Lauritson (Part I); Alexander Singer (Part II)
- Story by: Naren Shankar (Parts I & II); Christopher Hatton (Part I)
- Teleplay by: Naren Shankar (Part I); Ronald D. Moore (Part II)
- Production codes: 256 & 257
- Original air dates: October 11, 1993; October 18, 1993

Guest appearances
- Richard Lynch - Arctus Baran; Robin Curtis - Tallera/T'Paal; Caitlin Brown - Vekor; Cameron Thor - Narik; Alan Altshuld - Yranac; Bruce Gray - Adm. Chekote; Sabrina LeBeauf - Ensign Giusti; Stephen Lee - Alien Bartender; Derek Webster - Sanders; James Worthy - Koral; Martin Goslins - Satok

Episode chronology
| ← Previous "Interface" | Next → "Phantasms" |
- Star Trek: The Next Generation season 7

"Gambit" comprises the 156th and 157th episodes of the American science-fiction television series Star Trek: The Next Generation, which are the fourth and fifth episodes of the seventh season.

Set in the 24th century, the series follows the adventures of the Starfleet crew of the Federation starship Enterprise-D. In this episode, after hearing a rumor that Captain Picard has been murdered while on an archeological dig, the Enterprise crew sets out to find the smugglers who may have been responsible.

The episodes' guest stars include actor Richard Lynch, NBA star James Worthy, and Star Trek film veteran Robin Curtis.

== Plot ==
Riker, Troi, Crusher, and Worf investigate Picard's whereabouts in a dingy bar, describing him as a "smooth-headed" human. They find a criminal who knows something; he says that Picard had been asking a group about some artifacts when a fight broke out and Picard was "vaporized".

Many of the crew members accept this as true, but Riker insists on finding out who killed Captain Picard. The crew begins by retracing Picard's steps, and this leads them to a planet housing one of the most ancient archaeological sites in the galaxy. However, the artifacts have been stolen by a group of mercenaries. While Riker, Worf, La Forge, and a few other crew members are exploring, a variety of humanoids beams down and attacks the away team. They kill one crew member and capture Commander Riker.

Riker is taken on board the mercenary ship, which is commanded by Arctus Baran. Riker finds that a device has been implanted within his body, which allows Baran to inflict pain on him. Everyone on the ship has similar devices implanted in their bodies, which is how Baran controls his crew. Riker soon discovers that Picard is alive and in the company of these criminals, and is apparently doing business with them under the guise of a rogue archaeologist. Picard tells the crew that Riker is an officer with a history of insubordination, who was once even relieved of duty. Picard secretly contrives a warp-drive malfunction, giving Riker a chance to prove himself to Baran.

Later, Picard visits Riker in his quarters. He reveals that he went to study an archaeological site, but found that it had been ransacked. Tracing those responsible to a bar, Picard confronted them, but was taken prisoner. He then revealed that the criminals had configured some of their weapons so that if they shot someone or something with one of these modified weapons, it would instead activate the transporter and beam away the target – which is why the people in the bar thought he had been vaporized when shot. Picard managed to convince the crew that he was an archaeologist (named Galen, the name of his mentor who was shown in the episode "The Chase"). Picard reveals that they are looking for specific ancient artifacts of Romulan origin, and that Baran is having Picard search through the relics they have stolen for these specific artifacts.

Picard asks Riker to help him infiltrate the crew of the mercenary ship. As Picard and Baran had never gotten along well, Picard asks Riker to befriend Baran to help learn more about his plans. Picard also asks Riker to play into the role of a less-than-perfect, insubordinate Starfleet officer, who is ready to betray the Federation.

Eventually, Picard is able to find the two specific artifacts, which are actually of ancient Vulcan origin, and are part of an ancient Vulcan telepathic weapon, the Stone of Gol, which a Vulcan isolationist movement hopes to use to force Vulcan to leave the United Federation of Planets. Once the weapon is assembled, though, Picard realizes the true nature of it, once a powerful weapon, but utterly useless against people who do not bear aggressive thoughts. He realizes this is why the Vulcans had found it ineffectual, since their civilization definitively adapted to peace 2,000 years ago, so the useless weapon fell into oblivion. Using this knowledge, Picard manages to defeat the isolationists, and the Vulcan government assures Picard that all three pieces of the weapon will be destroyed.

Back aboard the Enterprise, Lt. Commander Data, although relieved to see Picard and Riker alive, points out that Riker is guilty of defection and that Picard is still, technically dead, so Picard jokingly suggests to Data to throw Riker in the brig while he goes and gets some much-needed rest. Data immediately complies, escorting Riker to the brig, as Riker tries to convince Data that Picard was only joking.

== Reception ==
In 2011, The A.V. Club reviewed "Gambit, Part II" and gave it a "B−", but they were very impressed with the dynamic relationship between Data and Worf. They were "thrilled" by the line by Data, "Mr. Worf, I am sorry if I have ended our friendship", and went so far to say they would like to see a spin-off with Captain Data and First Officer Worf. They had rated "Gambit, Part I" a "B", calling it a "fun, goofy romp" and praising its entertainment value as a cliffhanger.

In 2019, Den of Geek suggested it was one of five episodes of Star Trek: The Next Generation that had a higher degree of rewatchability, and had a focus on the character Captain Picard (played by Patrick Stewart). In this episode, of note, Data (Brent Spiner) gets to command the Enterprise 1701-D, with Worf (Michael Dorn) as his first officer.

Doux Reviews was very positive about Part I's characters, scenes, and acting; they praised the interesting struggles Data had in command as well as Picard and Riker surviving on Baran's spaceship. They felt Part II had good character development, even for the minor roles, and they also praised its moral message.

TV Guide noted the cameo by James Worthy as the very tall alien Koral, pointing out that at the time of his guest-star role, he was still playing professional basketball.

In 2020, CNET noted "Gambit" for featuring a focus on Captain Picard, but in a new situation where he does not have his normal ship and crew.

== Home video releases ==
"Gambit" was released on LaserDisc in the United Kingdom on June 9, 1997. The PAL format optical disc had a runtime of 88 minutes, including both parts of episode.

"Gambit, Part I" was released on LaserDisc in the USA on February 2, 1999, paired with "Interface" on the same double-sided disc (NTSC video). "Gambit, Part II" was released at the same time, but paired with "Phantasms" on one double-side LaserDisc.

Both parts of "Gambit" were released on VHS on a single tape (catalog number VHR 4109). "Gambit, Part I" was also released on VHS paired with "Interface" on one cassette (catalog number VHR 2857). "Gambit, Part 2" was released on VHS paired with "Phantasms" on one cassette tape (Catalog number VHR 2858).

"Gambit" was released as part of TNG Season 7 collections on DVD and Blu-Ray formats. Season 7 of TNG, which contains this episode, was released on Blu-ray disc in January 2015.
