= Journey's End (Star Trek: The Next Generation) =

- Star Trek: The Next Generation episode
- Episode no.: Season 7 Episode 20
- Directed by: Corey Allen
- Story by: Ronald D. Moore; Shawn Piller (idea); Anatonia Napoli (idea)
- Teleplay by: Ronald D. Moore
- Production code: 272
- Original air date: March 28, 1994

Guest appearances
- Wil Wheaton - Wesley Crusher; Tom Jackson - Lakanta; Natalija Nogulich - Admiral Nechayev; Ned Romero - Anthwara; George Aguilar - Wakasa; Richard Poe - Gul Evek; Eric Menyuk - The Traveler; Doug Wert - Jack Crusher

Episode chronology
← Previous "Genesis"	Next → "Firstborn"
- Star Trek: The Next Generation season 7

"Journey's End" is the 172nd episode of the American science fiction television series Star Trek: The Next Generation, and it is the 20th episode of the seventh season.

Set in the 24th century, the series follows the adventures of the Starfleet crew of the Federation starship Enterprise-D. In this episode, Wesley Crusher questions his future as the Enterprise is under orders to forcibly remove the descendants of native North Americans, referred to as "Indians" throughout the episode, from a planet being yielded to the Cardassians as part of a treaty.

== Plot ==
The Federation has agreed to turn several colonized planets over to the Cardassians as part of a long-negotiated treaty. The Enterprise, among other Starfleet ships, is assigned the task of relocating these Federation colonists. Admiral Alynna Nechayev warns Captain Picard that the colonists of Dorvan V are Puebloan settlers who wanted to create a new home for their culture, and Picard is to remove them by any means necessary. Before the Enterprise sets off for Dorvan V, Wesley comes aboard on vacation from Starfleet Academy. However, his mother Dr. Crusher and his former crewmates find him snappish and depressed.

At Dorvan V, Picard negotiates with the tribal council, led by Anthwara. Picard suggests that they found three other nearby homeworlds with similar conditions, but Anthwara insists that they must stay at Dorvan V, as their ancestors had spent 200 years to find a world with the right spiritual properties, and believes it would take just as long to find another. Anthwara reveals that Picard's ancestors had been involved with the Pueblo Revolt in the 17th century and that he carries some of that guilt to try to sway the Captain, a thought that troubles Picard. Wesley, meanwhile, meets Lakanta, one of the colony's holy men, who instructs him to go on a vision quest. During this, Wesley talks to his long-dead father, Jack Crusher, who suggests that Wesley is bound for a different destiny than his own.

The Cardassians, led by Gul Evek, arrive ahead of schedule, and begin to assess the planet. Though they are peaceful, tensions among the Federation and colonists start to rise. Picard prepares his crew to transport the colonists to the Enterprise by force. Wesley overhears of the plan and incites the colonists to riot. Picard warns Wesley against his actions, prompting Wesley to quit Starfleet on the spot. Wesley has a heart-to-heart discussion with Dr. Crusher, telling her about the vision quest and that he never thought Starfleet was right for him. Dr. Crusher reminds him about the Traveler, who told her Wesley was special, and that he might be bound for better things, and regardless what he does, she will be proud of him.

On the surface, the colonists take some of the Cardassians hostage, and Picard and Gul Evek try to come to a solution. Gul Evek mentions that he has lost two sons to the war with the Federation and does not want to lose his last one. A fight breaks out on the surface and Wesley tries to stop it, but ends up freezing time. Lakanta reveals himself to be the Traveler and is ready to help mentor Wesley on his new path. Wesley agrees and the two depart; the fighting continues and the Cardassians suffer casualties. Gul Evek agrees to evacuate his people to end the fighting. Eventually, Anthwara states that the colonists have decided to forgo their Federation citizenship, and Gul Evek affirms the Cardassians will allow them to remain on the planet as their citizens. As the Enterprise returns to Federation space, Wesley says his goodbyes and leaves with the Traveler.

== Background ==
This episode expands the story within Star Trek: The Next Generation about Cardassians, a humanoid alien race that has just concluded a war with the Federation. They are significantly expanded in Deep Space Nine (1993–1999), which began halfway through TNG's 6th season, and the events also provide a backstory to Star Trek: Voyager which ran from 1995 to 2001.

- "The Wounded" (January 28, 1991)
- "Ensign Ro" (October 7, 1991)
- "Chain of Command" (Part I & Part II, December 14, 1992, and December 21, 1992)
- "Lower Decks" (February 7, 1994)
- "Preemptive Strike" (May 16, 1994)

Wesley had left for Starfleet Academy in season 4 ("Final Mission") and there is an episode about his time at the academy in "The First Duty".

== Critical reception ==
Screenrant ranked the episode among the 10 worst episodes the series based on its IMDb score. Screenrant criticized the heavy-handed moral lesson, as well as the ending, and wrote "that the show not only tripped over its feet, but fell flat on its face."

In 2014, Ars Technica included this episode in the list of the five worst episodes of the series along with "The Naked Now," "Rascals," "Angel One," and "Up the Long Ladder." "Journey's End" is criticized by hurriedly ending the story arc of Wesley Crusher, taking place in a Native American stereotype planet, and ending with a deus ex machina.

"Journey's End" has been called by some critics ridiculous and non-genuine with respect to the character of Jean-Luc Picard. The fact that he feels guilt over something an ancestor of his did several centuries before does not fit his personality.

In 2021, Screen Rant noted that this marks the departure of Wesley to explore the universe with The Traveler. However, they note that he does return in the 2002 film Nemesis. They felt this was not a contradiction, because it would be logical he would want to return where he felt most comfortable, with his Starfleet colleagues. However, that same year they pointed out this was one of the bad character endings of Star Trek, and that his departure "seemed completely out of left field."

== Home media release ==
This episode was released in Japan on LaserDisc on October 9, 1998, as part of the half-season collection Log.14: Seventh Season Part.2. This set included episodes from "Lower Decks" to Part II of "All Good Things", with English and Japanese audio tracks.

== See also ==
- Star Trek: Insurrection – The ninth Star Trek film, of which coerced relocation is also a major plot element
- "Homeward" – an earlier season seven episode also involving relocation
