= Homeward (Star Trek: The Next Generation) =

- Star Trek: The Next Generation episode
- Episode no.: Season 7 Episode 13
- Directed by: Alexander Singer
- Story by: Spike Steingasser; William N. Stape (idea)
- Teleplay by: Naren Shankar
- Production code: 265
- Original air date: January 17, 1994

Guest appearances
- Penny Johnson - Dobara; Brian Markinson - Vorin; Edward Penn - Kateras; Paul Sorvino - Nikolai Rozhenko; Susan Christy - Tarrana; Majel Barrett - Computer Voice

Episode chronology
| ← Previous "The Pegasus" | Next → "Sub Rosa" |

"Homeward" is the 165th episode of the American science fiction television series Star Trek: The Next Generation. It is the 13th episode of the show's seventh season.

Set in the 24th century, the series follows the adventures of the Starfleet crew of the Federation starship Enterprise-D. In this episode, Lt. Worf, the Klingon Chief of Security of the Enterprise, must work with his human brother Nikolai Rozhenko, a Federation anthropologist, to save a small group of natives from a primitive alien culture on a dying planet.

== Plot ==
The Enterprise receives an emergency distress call from Worf's adoptive brother, Nikolai Rozhenko, who is currently posted to Boraal II, a class M planet in the process of suffering an atmospheric catastrophe.

The Federation observation post is found to be deserted, but force field shielding has been set up nearby which protects a series of caverns. Enterprise Captain Jean-Luc Picard decides to send an away team to investigate. Concerned for his brother, Worf volunteers, and Picard orders him to go alone and be surgically altered to pass as a Boraalan. Worf transports to the planet and discovers that his brother set up the shield to protect the local villagers.

Nikolai meets with the ship’s senior officers and describes his plan to save one village of the doomed planet by setting up a concealed artificial biosphere. Picard replies that the Federation Prime Directive prohibits interference with the natural development of the Boraalan civilization; it is not for them to decide that one group shall survive while the rest of the planet perishes.

After witnessing the atmospheric dissipation extinction event transpire, the crew is puzzled by an unexpected power drain, the origin of which Worf tracks to the Holodeck. His brother has transported the population of the Boraalan village aboard the ship, using the Holodeck to replicate caverns identical to those on the planet, misleading the villagers into thinking they are still on Boraal II.

Nikolai tells Worf and Picard that he believes offering the Boraalan culture a chance of survival is more important than following the Prime Directive. He champions his updated plan of transporting the Boraalans to a new home on a different planet. Picard reluctantly authorizes the plan and orders Chief Medical Officer Dr. Beverly Crusher and Operations Officer Lt. Commander Data to find a new home planet for the Boraalans.

Crusher and Data choose Vacca VI as the new Boraalan home world, but it is almost two days away at maximum warp. Ship’s Chief Engineer Lt. Commander Geordi La Forge tells Picard and Nikolai that the Holodeck program may not run that long. Nikolai volunteers to return to the Boraalans and help account for any anomalies in the program. A mistrustful Picard orders Worf to accompany him.

Returning to the Holodeck, Nikolai and Worf tell the Boraalans that they will lead them to a new home. As they travel, Worf and Nikolai nearly come to blows when Worf learns that his brother has impregnated one of the villagers, and Nikolai tells Worf that he intends to remain with the Boraalans.

Vorin, the village chronicler, finds his way out of the Holodeck and suffers severe culture shock at the reality of the world outside. After determining that Vorin's unique Boraalan neurology prevents his memory from being wiped, Enterprise Counsellor Deanna Troi and Picard try to help him adjust, offering him the choice of remaining on the Enterprise or returning to his people with the knowledge that their actual homeworld was destroyed. Ultimately, Vorin cannot live with what he has discovered and commits ritual suicide.

The Enterprise arrives at the new Boraalan home, and the Boraalans are beamed down to the eventual site of their new village. Worf and Nikolai make peace when Worf accepts that the Boraalan race would not have survived if not for his brother's unconventional methods. Nikolai assuages Worf by telling him that he is going to stay with the villagers and become the new village chronicler. Aboard the Enterprise, Picard muses with Crusher that while their plan for the Boraalans worked out well, he is disappointed that Vorin was not able to bridge the gap between their two cultures.

== Production ==
Guest star Penny Johnson would later return to the Star Trek franchise with a recurring role on Star Trek: Deep Space Nine as Kasidy Yates.

The film Star Trek: Insurrection would also feature the concept of using holodeck technology to transplant an alien race without their knowledge.

== Reception ==
Zack Handlen of The A.V. Club gave the episode a B+ grade. Keith DeCandido of Tor.com rated it 1 out of 10.

== See also ==
- Star Trek: Insurrection - The ninth Star Trek film, of which coerced relocation is also a major plot element
- "Journey's End" (Star Trek: The Next Generation) (S7E20, March 28, 1994) - also involves re-settlement but with a Federation colony
- "Dear Doctor" (Enterprise S1E12, January 23, 2002) - Archer lets millions die by withholding cure
