= Nova Squadron =

Nova Squadron may refer to:

- Nova Squadron (Terran Confederacy)
- Nova Squadron (Star Trek), an elite precision flight team at Starfleet Academy
