= Interface (Star Trek: The Next Generation) =

- Star Trek: The Next Generation episode
- Episode no.: Season 7 Episode 3
- Directed by: Robert Wiemer
- Written by: Joe Menosky
- Cinematography by: Jonathan West
- Production code: 255
- Original air date: October 4, 1993

Guest appearances
- Madge Sinclair - Capt. Silva La Forge; Warren Munson - Admiral Marcus Holt; Ben Vereen - Cmdr. Edward M. La Forge

Episode chronology
← Previous "Liaisons"	Next → "Gambit, Part I"
- Star Trek: The Next Generation season 7

"Interface" is the 155th episode of the American syndicated science fiction television series Star Trek: The Next Generation, the third episode of the seventh season.

Set in the 24th century, the series follows the adventures of the Starfleet crew of the Federation starship Enterprise-D. In this episode, Geordi La Forge uses an experimental interface to his VISOR to try to reach his missing mother, a Starfleet captain.

This episode is noted for introducing some of Geordi's family and also exploring man–machine interfaces.

== Plot ==
Chief Engineer Geordi La Forge, Lt. Commander Data, and Chief Medical Officer Dr. Crusher are testing an interface which allows La Forge to use the VISOR-compatible circuitry in his brain along with a virtual reality suit to control a probe by remote control. This way La Forge can use the probe to go into areas that would be too dangerous for crew members to enter. When testing is complete, La Forge is informed that the ship his mother commanded has disappeared, and all aboard are presumed dead.

La Forge uses the interface to remotely control the probe and look for survivors on the USS Raman that is trapped in a gas giant's atmosphere. He finds that there is no one left alive on the ship, but believes that he encountered his mother on the ship. Continued use of the probe soon exposes La Forge to unhealthy levels of neural stimulation.

La Forge is convinced that his mother was on the ship, and wants to use the probe to communicate with his mother. But Dr. Crusher and Captain Picard refuse to allow him to use the interface suit again. La Forge decides to use the suit anyway. While in contact with the probe, he encounters the being who appears to be his mother again, but learns that she is actually a lifeform native to the gas giant. This being talks La Forge into taking the ship closer to the planet, so that she and others like her trapped on the ship can go home.

After he is reprimanded by Picard for his disobedience, La Forge concludes that his mother is in fact dead, and that it had all seemed so real he had thought he had a chance to say goodbye to her.

== Production ==
When Joe Menosky was in Europe, the writing team allowed him to continue working and gave him the task of developing something around the idea of "Geordi's mom". In this period he had to communicate by FedEx and faxes, which made development more difficult. The idea of Geordi's mom was exciting to the writing team, because there had not been a lot of family relationship development for the Geordi character. Meanwhile, Menosky had been wanting to do something involving a Mind-Machine interface.

The scene where Riker and Geordi talk about parental loss was actually written by Jeri Taylor, which was added when the episode runtime was too low.

The episode uses a convention where Geordi is shown in place of the probe he is interfacing with. Director Robert Wiemer stated that it would have been "emotionally unrewarding" to show the probe then frequently cut to Geordi for reaction shots.

Madge Sinclair plays Geordi's mother, and Ben Vereen plays his father. Madge Sinclair had previously acted in the Star Trek franchise in the 1986 theatrical film Star Trek IV : The Voyage Home, also as a Starfleet Captain. Levar Burton, Sinclair, and Vereen all appeared in the miniseries Roots.

== Reception ==
Zack Handlen of The A.V. Club wrote in his review: "I was curious to see what kind of energy [Ben Vereen would] bring to the show. ... Not a terrible scene, but there isn't much to it; and that’s the only appearance Vereen makes. ... it seems like a waste. Much like everything else about this episode." Jamahl Epsicokhan of Jammer's Reviews wrote in his review: "'Interface', while not great or groundbreaking, is a significant step up from the first two lackluster outings of season seven — much more focused, much less of a mess, and with true character motivation at its core."

== Novel ==
The episode had a spin-off written about the fate of the Federation space ship USS Hera; the book Indistinguishable from Magic by David A. McIntee.

== Props ==
Geordi's sensor suit from this episode was sold at Christie's 40 Years of Star Trek: The Collection auction in 2006.

== Releases ==
"Interface" and "Gambit, Part I" were released on VHS paired together on one cassette (catalog number VHR 2857).

"Interface" and "Gambit, Part I" were released on LaserDisc in the USA on February 2, 1999, paired on the same double sided disc (NTSC video).

"Interface" was released as part of TNG Season 7 collections on DVD and Blu-Ray formats. Season seven of TNG, which contains this episode was released on Blu-ray disc in January 2015.
