= Bloodlines (Star Trek: The Next Generation) =

- Star Trek: The Next Generation episode
- Episode no.: Season 7 Episode 22
- Directed by: Les Landau
- Written by: Nick Sagan
- Production code: 274
- Original air date: May 2, 1994

Guest appearances
- Lee Arenberg - Bok; Ken Olandt - Jason Vigo; Peter Slutsker - Birta; Amy Pietz - Sandra Rhodes; Michelan Sisti - Tol

Episode chronology
← Previous "Firstborn"	Next → "Emergence"
- Star Trek: The Next Generation season 7

"Bloodlines" the 174th episode of the American science fiction television series Star Trek: The Next Generation. The 22nd episode of the seventh season. Set in the 24th century, the series follows the adventures of the Starfleet crew of the Federation starship Enterprise-D. Actor Ken Olandt guest stars as Jason Vigo. Lee Arenberg replaces Frank Corsentino as Bok.

== Plot ==
The episode begins with Bok (a former Ferengi DaiMon whose son was killed in a battle with the USS Stargazer, then commanded by Picard) announcing his intention to kill Picard's son in revenge.

Picard, who is not aware of having a son, eventually locates Jason Vigo, the son of a woman named Miranda Vigo, with whom Picard had had a past relationship. The results of a DNA test confirm that Jason is indeed Picard's son, but Picard's attempts to bond with Jason prove difficult, and he is dismayed to discover that Jason has a criminal record, having been convicted of petty theft and trespassing. Meanwhile, Bok beams to the Enterprise twice (using subspace transport technology) to repeat his threats, and Jason suffers attacks from an unknown disease.

Finally, Bok beams Jason off the Enterprise and onto his own ship. La Forge determines that the transport is occurring via a small transport platform, and that research into subspace transporter technology was abandoned by the Federation because of its extreme unreliability and high energy requirements.

Picard then beams to Bok's ship via the Ferengi's own subspace transporter, where he confronts Bok and three other Ferengi and reveals that Dr. Crusher has discovered that Jason Vigo is not, in fact, Picard's son. Bok had resequenced Jason's DNA so that Picard would know how it felt to lose a son, but Bok's technique was flawed, and the deception was exposed when Crusher determined that Jason's disease was normally inherited, yet neither his mother nor Picard had it.

Realizing that there was no profit to be earned from Bok's revenge scheme, the three other Ferengi then disarm Bok and release Jason. After gladly hearing the news that Jason's condition is responding well to Dr. Crusher's treatment, Picard invites him to stay on the Enterprise a few more days. However, Jason decides to return to his life on Camor V to "straighten things out." In the transporter room, after Jason suggests he look him up should he ever be in the area, Picard finally bonds with his 'son' by presenting him with a Gorlan prayer stick, a rare artifact that Picard had traded a valuable bottle of Saurian brandy to obtain. Jason is sincerely touched by Picard's generosity.

== Video releases ==
This was released in Japan on LaserDisc on October 9, 1998, as part of the half-season collection Log.14: Seventh Season Part.2. This set included episodes from "Lower Decks" to Part II of "All Good Things", with English and Japanese audio tracks.

== Reception ==
In 2014, Ars Technica said this is one of the bad episodes of season seven, saying it was "awful."
