= Liaisons (Star Trek: The Next Generation) =

- Star Trek: The Next Generation episode
- Episode no.: Season 7 Episode 2
- Directed by: Cliff Bole
- Story by: Roger Eschbacher; Jaq Greenspon
- Teleplay by: Jeanne Carrigan Fauci; Lisa Rich
- Production code: 254
- Original air date: September 27, 1993

Guest appearances
- Barbara Williams - Anna; Eric Pierpoint - Voval; Paul Eiding - Loquel; Michael Harris - Byleth; Rickey D'Shon Collins - Boy (Eric)

Episode chronology
← Previous "Descent, Part II"	Next → "Interface"
- Star Trek: The Next Generation season 7

"Liaisons" is the 154th episode of the American science fiction television series Star Trek: The Next Generation, and the second episode of the seventh season.

The episode first aired on September 27, 1993 and was directed by Cliff Bole. The teleplay was written by Jeanne Carrigan Fauci and Lisa Rich based on a story written by Roger Eschbacher and Jaq Greenspon.

Set in the 24th century, the series follows the adventures of the Starfleet crew of the Federation starship Enterprise-D. In this episode, the Enterprise-D crew takes on ambassadors as part of a cultural exchange, with Picard departing to spend time with the aliens.

== Plot ==
The Enterprise welcomes two Iyaaran ambassadors, Loquel and Byleth, who are visiting the ship as part of a "cultural exchange" that will also send Picard to their planet. Before Picard departs, he assigns Troi to act as Loquel's liaison and asks Riker to do the same for Byleth. But Byleth has other ideas, and instead demands that Worf serve as his shipboard guide. Soon afterward, Picard departs for the Iyaaran homeworld with Voval, the Iyaaran shuttle pilot, who is gruff and uncommunicative. Their awkward silence is disrupted by a malfunction aboard their ship. Crashing on an unknown planet, Voval receives a concussion, but Picard is seemingly unhurt. He decides to seek help outside, but is knocked unconscious by a plasma surge from the planet's stormy surface. While he lies unconscious, someone silently drags him away.

Picard awakens on the distant planet in a small, dimly-lit cargo cabin. He is approached by a solemn, human woman who informs him that Voval did not survive the crash. Picard learns that the woman's name is Anna and that she is the sole survivor of a Terellian cargo freighter crash that occurred seven years before. After Anna tells him that he has three broken ribs, he sends her to retrieve the shuttlecraft's com panel to send a distress signal.

Back on the Enterprise, Troi has introduced Loquel to dessert, and Loquel is so intrigued that even the next morning he is drinking sweet juice. Worf has had about all he can take of his abrasive, demanding guest. Riker decides that the tension might be eased by a "friendly" game of poker. The game is anything but "friendly," and Worf realizes that Byleth is stealing chips. Before long, Worf loses control and, despite Riker's insistence that he calm down, attacks his guest. But instead of getting angry, Byleth is pleased. He expresses admiration for Worf's display of anger and politely excuses himself to document the experience, leaving everyone confused (with the exception of Loquel, who is still reveling in his dessert).

Meanwhile, Anna brings the transmitter module back to her cargo ship, and admits to Picard she accidentally destroyed it, using a phaser blast to remove it earlier. Picard is then shocked when Anna suddenly kisses him and tells him she loves him. Picard becomes enraged at Anna when he realizes that his ribs are not really broken, and the woman, who continues to beg for his love, is actually holding him captive. He angrily alerts Anna to his discovery, at which point she becomes distraught over failing to gain his affection and rushes out the door, breaking off her necklace and locking Picard inside. Voval comes and opens the door, and talks to Picard.

Voval explains that he only appeared to be dead because, when Iyaarans are injured, their metabolic rates slow down in order to promote healing. He and Picard set off in search of Anna, eventually separating. Picard finds her at the edge of a cliff, threatening to commit suicide if he does not tell her he loves her. When he notices that Anna is again wearing her necklace and that Voval has again disappeared, Picard senses that something strange is going on and tells Anna to go ahead and jump. At that moment, she transforms herself back into Voval, who explains that he is not really a pilot, but a Iyaaran ambassador. He staged the crash in order to study the emotion of love, non-existent on the Iyaaran homeworld, by using Picard as a subject. Similarly, Loquel and Byleth were sent to experience pleasure and antagonism, respectively. Picard is taken aback at first, but upon returning to the Enterprise, acknowledges the experiments of the three ambassadors as being productive.

Upon their departure, Worf and Byleth inform Riker of their marathon eleven-hour session in the holodeck doing battle exercises, which has enabled Byleth to explore the concept of "antagonism" in a less destructive manner. Loquel offers a sampling of Iyaaran nourishment to Troi as a token of his appreciation, but apologizes that it is not as delicious as the dessert he has enjoyed while in Troi's company. Troi accepts the food, stating that the volume of dessert they have consumed has surpassed even her threshold, and she will be quite content to eat something bland.

== Releases ==
"Liaisons" was published by Paramount in 1998 on VHS format, an example of that type of release in the 1990s. It was also released on 12-inch LaserDisc format in 1998, with "Descent, Part II" on the same disc. The entire TNG show was released on LaserDisc between 1991 and 1999.

"Liaisons" has been released as part of TNG Season 7 collections on DVD and Blu-Ray formats. Season seven of TNG, which contains "Liaisons" was released on Blu-ray disc in January 2015.

"Liaisons" was released as a single episode by the online streaming service CBS All Access.
