= Dark Page =

- Star Trek: The Next Generation episode
- Episode no.: Season 7 Episode 7
- Directed by: Les Landau
- Written by: Hilary J. Bader
- Production code: 259
- Original air date: November 1, 1993

Guest appearances
- Majel Barrett - Lwaxana Troi; Norman Large - Maques; Kirsten Dunst - Hedril; Amick Byram - Ian Andrew Troi; Andreana Weiner - Kestra Troi

Episode chronology
← Previous "Phantasms"	Next → "Attached"
- Star Trek: The Next Generation season 7

"Dark Page" is the 159th episode of the American science fiction television series Star Trek: The Next Generation, the seventh episode of the seventh season. It features a guest appearance by a young Kirsten Dunst as a young alien. It was also Lwaxana Troi's last appearance in an episode of Star Trek: Next Generation.

Set in the 24th century, the series follows the adventures of the Starfleet crew of the Federation starship Enterprise-D. In this episode, while visiting the Enterprise Lwaxana Troi is preoccupied by a dark secret she has carried for years.

== Plot ==
Lwaxana Troi returns to the Enterprise, this time as the teacher of an alien race, the Cairn, who are learning to speak. The Cairn's native form of communication is telepathy, but they want to learn spoken language in order to interact with other races. Lwaxana comes aboard with Ambassador Maques and his young daughter, Hedril, who is Lwaxana's star pupil.

Suspecting that Lwaxana is not her usual flamboyant self, her daughter, Deanna Troi, tries to investigate. When Lwaxana starts showing signs of fatigue, she is taken to sickbay to be examined. Beverly tells Lwaxana that her interaction with the aliens is more taxing on her telepathic ability than she is used to, and is asked to refrain from contact with the Cairn until she can recover. Deanna helps her mother by verbally communicating with Maques and Hedril, but Lwaxana still uses her telepathy when they don't grasp the verbal concepts. After an incident where Hedril falls into a pool of water in the arboretum, Lwaxana falls into a coma. With no signs of physical trauma, Crusher deduces that her telepathic abilities have caused her mind to collapse in on itself from overuse. Maques uses his ability to form a bridge between Deanna and Lwaxana, and the former finds herself walking through corridors like those on the Enterprise. Lwaxana's mental defenses pick up, first conjuring an image of Picard himself ordering her to sever her connection. She then creates an image of a wolf that chases Deanna through the corridor. After escaping through a door, she sees her father in a place where they once lived. She sees through all the ruses and exits back into the corridor. Lwaxana then charges after her screaming for Deanna to get away from her, causing Deanna to break her connection.

Deanna and Picard search through Lwaxana's things and find several pieces of the puzzle missing; seven years of entries for a journal Lwaxana kept since being married had been erased, from shortly after her marriage until a few months after Deanna's birth. The image of Hedril in her mother's mind does not add up. She tries again to reach her mother. With the telepathic connection to her mother reestablished, Deanna sees Hedril petting the wolf, and cautions her. When she says Hedril's name, the girl asks who Hedril is. Deanna follows the girl and the wolf through the deck until she encounters a turbolift that opens into space. Hearing her mother call for help, Deanna jumps in and lands in the arboretum where Lwaxana had collapsed. Lwaxana is there, still begging Deanna to leave, but Deanna refuses, stating that a repressed memory is killing her and she must relive the memory in order to survive. Suddenly, an image of a human girl who looks like Hedril is playing by the water with a puppy, and Lwaxana calls her Kestra—her first born child, and Deanna's older sister, whom Deanna never knew she had. Deanna urges Lwaxana to relive what happened, and she tearfully remembers a tragedy when Kestra ran after the puppy when it got away, though it was unclear what had caused her death. However, the clues seem to indicate that she fell into the water and drowned. Lwaxana's repressed memory of Kestra and her resemblance to Hedril led to her coma. As Lwaxana recalls happier memories of Kestra, Deanna tells her to share them so she can learn about the sister she never knew. The women awaken in sickbay holding hands. Later, it is revealed that Mr. Homn saved mementos of Kestra, and Deanna asks her mother to tell her everything about her.

== Production ==
In addition to being the last episode of Star Trek: The Next Generation to feature Lwaxana Troi, it was the first sighting of Deanna Troi's father, Ian Andrew Troi (played by Amick Byram).

This episode was written by Hilary J. Bader; Bader began as TNG season 3 writing intern, and would also write for "The Loss" and "Hero Worship" (3 total for TNG). Bader went on to write for many children's cartoon shows and comic books. The hardest part for Bader in writing this episode was brainstorming the source of Lwaxana Troi's trauma that did not portray her unsympathetically.

== Reception ==
The episode received a rating of 6 out of 10 from Tor.com.

Zack Handlen of The A.V. Club gave the episode a B−, writing, "Dark Page is a not-too-terrible episode which nonetheless points to ... something of a theme for the seventh season: a show that’s working so hard to make an impact that the care and attention it used to put into characterization is in danger of being lost."

A SyFy review praised the episode's portrayal of Lwaxana and Deanna Troi's relationship, saying, "I will defend 'Dark Page' forever because there aren't a lot of times Star Trek boldly tries to deal with a mother losing a child ... Lwaxana loses a daughter. She loses a husband. And then she becomes sort of transient and finds that she's the only one who even knows this other young girl ever existed. No wonder she tried to bury it. No wonder she can't."

TV Guide and Variety noted the young Kirsten Dunst's appearance in the episode. She gained widespread acclaim one year later in her breakout role in Interview with the Vampire and later starred in the blockbuster Spider-Man film series in the 2000s.

== Releases ==
"Dark Page" was released as part of TNG Season 7 collections on DVD and Blu-Ray formats. Season seven of TNG, which contains "Dark Page" was released on Blu-ray disc in January 2015.
