= All Good Things... (Star Trek: The Next Generation) =

- Star Trek: The Next Generation episodes
- Episode nos.: Season 7 Episodes 25 & 26
- Directed by: Winrich Kolbe
- Written by: Brannon Braga; Ronald D. Moore
- Cinematography by: Jonathan West
- Production codes: 277 & 278
- Original air date: May 23, 1994
- Running time: 90 minutes

Guest appearances
- Denise Crosby - Tasha Yar; Colm Meaney - Miles O'Brien; John de Lancie - Q; Andreas Katsulas - Tomalak; Clyde Kusatsu - Adm. Nakamura; Patti Yasutake - Alyssa Ogawa; Pamela Kosh - Jessel; Tim Kelleher - Gaines; Alison Brooks - Chilton; Stephen Matthew Garvin - Ensign; Majel Barrett - Computer Voice

Episode chronology
← Previous "Preemptive Strike"	Next → —

"All Good Things..." is the series finale of the syndicated American science fiction television series Star Trek: The Next Generation. It comprises the 25th and 26th episodes of the seventh season and is the 177th and 178th episodes of the series overall. It aired on May 23, 1994. The title is derived from the expression "All good things must come to an end", a phrase used by the character Q during the episode itself.

Set in the 24th century, the series follows the adventures of the Starfleet crew of the Federation starship Enterprise-D. The plot involves Captain Jean-Luc Picard jumping through time and the formation of an anomaly that defies causality, the whole situation being a test that allows Picard to demonstrate human potential to the Q Continuum by making an intuitive leap of faith to understand the cause of, and how to eliminate, the anomaly before it destroys humanity.

The finale received universal acclaim, and marked the transition of the cast to films featuring the show's cast and settings, as well as passing the television audience to Star Trek spin-offs based on similar settings to The Next Generation.

== Plot ==
Capt. Jean-Luc Picard inexplicably finds his mind jumping among three points in time: the present (stardate 47988); seven years earlier, just prior to the starship USS Enterprise-D's first mission during the episode "Encounter at Farpoint"; and over twenty-five years into the future, where an aged Picard has retired to the family vineyard in La Barre, France. These jumps occur without warning, and the resulting discontinuity in Picard's behavior leaves him and those around him confused and concerned about his mental health.

In the present, Picard is ordered to take the Enterprise to the edge of the Romulan Neutral Zone to investigate a spatial anomaly. In the future, he convinces his ex-wife, Dr. Beverly Picard, to take him on the USS Pasteur to find the anomaly. In the past, despite having Enterprise's mission to Farpoint Station cancelled by Starfleet to investigate the anomaly, Picard insists on continuing, believing the impending encounter with the omnipotent being Q to be more important. After reaching the place where he had first encountered Q, Picard finds himself back in Q's courtroom as seen in the first episode. Q reveals that the trial never concluded, and the current situation is humanity's last chance to prove themselves to the Q Continuum, but he secretly reveals that he is the cause of Picard's time jumping. Q challenges Picard to solve the mystery of the anomaly, cryptically stating that Picard will destroy humanity.

As Picard arrives at the anomaly in all three time periods, he discovers that the anomaly is much larger in the past, but does not exist at all in the future. As the past and present Enterprises scan the anomaly with inverse tachyon pulse beams, the Pasteur is attacked by Klingon ships, but the crew is saved due to the timely arrival of the Enterprise under the command of Admiral William Riker. Q once again appears to Picard and takes him to Earth 3.5 billion years ago, where the anomaly, growing larger as it moves backwards in time, has enveloped the whole of the Alpha Quadrant and has prevented the formation of life on Earth. When Picard returns to the future, he discovers the anomaly has just appeared, created as a result of his orders, and the tachyon pulses from the three eras are sustaining it. Data and Geordi determine the anomaly is an anti-time rift and that they can stop it by having all three Enterprises fly into the center of it and create static warp shells. Picard relays the orders to each Enterprise. Each ship suffers catastrophic damage, with Q telling the future Picard that "all good things must come to an end" just before the future Enterprise explodes.

Picard finds himself facing Q in the courtroom as before. Q congratulates Picard for being able to think in multiple timelines simultaneously to solve the puzzle, which is proof that humanity can still evolve, much to his surprise. Q admits to helping Picard solve it with the time jumping, since he was the one that put them in this situation, and then goes on to explain that the anomaly has been stopped and that his past and present have been restored. He then withdraws from the courtroom and bids farewell to Picard by saying "See you ... out there". Picard then returns to the Enterprise of the present, no longer jumping through time.

As the senior staff members play their regular poker game, they reflect on the details of the future the captain related to prevent them from drifting apart. For the first time, Picard decides to join the game, expressing regret he had not done so before, and being reminded that he was always welcome.

== Production ==
Ronald D. Moore and Brannon Braga expected Michael Piller, the show's head writer and one of its executive producers, or Jeri Taylor would write the finale; consequently, they wound up writing "All Good Things..." concurrently with Star Trek Generations, often confusing aspects of the two. The finale took a month to write.

The idea of what the series finale should be about had been a matter of discussion in the writers' room for a year or two prior to the finale being written. The writers knew early on they wanted to do an episode featuring Q, to "bookend" his key role in the pilot. An early draft of the script for the episode included a section with Captain Picard as Locutus of Borg, but was cut on the insistence of Piller, who thought the show worked best with fewer timelines to jump between. According to Braga, Hugh, the rescued Borg from "I, Borg" would have appeared, rescuing Picard from the Borg Collective. Also cut from the script was a segment where the crew had to steal the Enterprise from a Starfleet museum (similar to events in the movie Star Trek III: The Search for Spock). The final scene, in which the crew play a hand of poker together, was the last scene shot for the show.

John de Lancie returned for his recurring role as Q. Former cast members Denise Crosby (whose regular character Tasha Yar had died in the first season, and who had made two guest appearances since) and Colm Meaney (who had left the series during the sixth season, when his recurring character Miles O'Brien became a regular on Star Trek: Deep Space Nine), reprised their roles for scenes set in the past.

The vineyard scene was shot at Callaway Vineyard and Winery in Temecula in southern California, in the United States.

As the final scenes were filmed on the last day, the support staff and production crew came down to the set to see the end of the shoot on the series.

A behind-the-scenes retrospective documentary called Journey's End: The Saga of Star Trek: The Next Generation, hosted by Jonathan Frakes, was filmed at the same time as the finale was being produced.

== Broadcast and reception ==
=== Broadcast ===
Both parts of "All Good Things..." were first broadcast on May 23, 1994, in broadcast syndication. It received Nielsen ratings of 17.4, placing it in first place in its timeslot. This was the highest rating received by any episode of the season, and of the series. Until the broadcast of the episodes, the previously highest rated broadcast of The Next Generation had been the pilot episode, "Encounter at Farpoint", with Nielsen ratings of 15.7.

=== Contemporary reception and reviews ===
In 1994, USA Today called the two-part finale a "picture-perfect" ending to the series, giving it 3 1/2 stars out of 4. "All Good Things..." won the 1995 Hugo Award for Best Dramatic Presentation, and helped the show earn a 1994 Emmy nomination for Outstanding Drama Series.

=== Later critical reception ===
The episode ranked fifth in Entertainment Weekly's list of top 10 Star Trek: The Next Generation (TNG) episodes in 2007. In 2011, Zack Handlen of The A.V. Club gave both parts of the two-hour finale an 'A' rating. Writing for Tor.com, Keith DeCandido lauded the episode; comparing it favorably against other Star Trek series finales, he felt that "All Good Things..." is "the perfect ending to [The Next Generation]", bringing events full circle back to series premiere "Encounter at Farpoint", showcasing the talents of the entire cast, as well as keeping its optimistic "Roddenberrian view of humanity." He also compared the show favorably with the best episodes of the seventh season, including "Parallels", "The Pegasus", and "Lower Decks".

In a 2012 publication, the finale was said to be written as a "valentine" to the show's fans, and noted that the episode was regarded as one of the series' best episodes.

In 2015, The Hollywood Reporter noted this episode's scene where Picard sits down at the card game table as one of the top ten "most stunning" moments of TNG. In 2016, SyFy ranked "All Good Things..." as the 4th best time travel plot of all Star Trek television episodes, and Radio Times ranked the final scene the 8th best moment in all Star Trek, noting Troi's line about Picard having been welcome to join their game, and Picard's line "The sky's the limit" with the camera pulling away on the group before credits roll. IGN ranked this the 7th best episode of all Star Trek series prior to Star Trek: Discovery.

Marcus Berkmann's book Set Phasers to Stun: 50 Years of Star Trek said of the episode, "[it] is about symmetry, squaring the circle, giving shape to the series and also to the universe in which the series exists." In 2017, Den of Geek ranked this episode as one of top 25 "must watch" episodes of TNG when paired with the series pilot "Encounter at Farpoint."^{[42]} In 2017, Nerdist ranked this finale the tenth best episode of TNG.

Io9/Gizmodo ranked the fictional spacecraft design shown in this episode, Admiral Riker's Enterprise-D from the future, as the 6th of 11 Enterprises in the Star Trek franchise. CBR ranked this episode the fifth best time-travel episode of all Star Trek. ThoughtCo ranked the episode as the 4th best episode of this series, pointing out that it is rare for a finale of a television show to be as well received by audiences as this one was. Also in 2019, The Hollywood Reporter ranked "All Good Things..." among the top twenty five episodes of TNG. Screen Rant ranked "All Good Things..." the seventh best episode of TNG. They also ranked it as the most important episode to watch in preparation for the series Star Trek: Picard.

The Digital Fix said this was the third best episode of TNG. SciFiPulse.net ranked this episode one of the top seven about Picard. ScreenRant said this was the best Star Trek series finale, stating that it's the "well-known, beloved king of finales." Cinemablend ranked this one of the top ten episodes of TNG. Tom's Guide said that this was the best episode for Q, and a great send-off for the character.

== Home media release and other adaptations ==
"All Good Things..." was originally released on VHS in the UK as Star Trek: The Next Generation Volume 89, with the 2 part syndicated version used in error. The original 90 minute version, was released a few months later as a collectors edition paired with the retrospective documentary "Journey's End: The Saga Of Star Trek: The Next Generation" as well as trailers for all seven Star Trek feature films. It was later released as a standalone Blu-ray with exclusive features.

On July 7, 1997 "All Good Things..." was released on a PAL-format LaserDisc in the United Kingdom, for £19.98.

This was released in Japan on LaserDisc on October 9, 1998, as part of the half-season collection Log.14: Seventh Season Part.2. This set included episodes from "Lower Decks" to Part II of "All Good Things", with English and Japanese audio tracks.

A novelization of the episode was published by Pocket Books in June 1994. It was written by Michael Jan Friedman in two weeks. It was published in hardcover and as a result, Friedman looked to expand on the episode to warrant the release. Scenes featuring Katherine Pulaski, Lwaxana Troi and Wesley Crusher were added. He suggested that the inclusion of further scenes with other characters made the novelization more of an ensemble piece rather than the actual episode which is very Picard focused. It was one of five novelizations to be made of The Next Generation episodes, alongside "Encounter at Farpoint", "Unification", "Relics" and "Descent".

The paid online/streaming version of this episode, such as through Amazon Prime Video, is a condensed cut for syndication. For example, sections of dialogue are missing from Part II, such as the exchange between Worf and Picard at 51:05, when Worf says "You have always used your knowledge of Klingon honor and tradition to get what you want from me..."

== Legacy ==
Writers for the TV show Lost cited Picard's time travel in the episode "All Good Things..." as a reference for how characters traveled through time in their 2008 episode "The Constant".

After, and even during the time film shooting wrapped up for TNG, work also focused on the film Generations which was released later that year in 1994 and following the end of TNG, Star Trek: Deep Space Nine was briefly the only Star Trek show airing on television. Meanwhile, a successor to TNG, Star Trek: Voyager was in development and was shooting by later in 1994, and aired in January 1995 for the launch of UPN. The launch episode, one of the most expensive in TV history at $23 million, was watched by about 21.3 million people.

The 1995 Star Trek novel Crossover by Michael Jan Friedman is set after this episode but before the movie Generations.

According to producer Kevin Feige, "All Good Things..." served as an inspiration for character evolution in Avengers: Endgame.
