= Sub Rosa (Star Trek: The Next Generation) =

- Star Trek: The Next Generation episode
- Episode no.: Season 7 Episode 14
- Directed by: Jonathan Frakes
- Story by: Jeri Taylor; Jeanna F. Gallo (idea)
- Teleplay by: Brannon Braga
- Production code: 266
- Original air date: January 31, 1994

Guest appearances
- Michael Keenan – Maturin; Shay Duffin – Ned Quint; Duncan Regehr – Ronin; Ellen Albertini Dow – Felisa Howard

Episode chronology
← Previous "Homeward"	Next → "Lower Decks"
- Star Trek: The Next Generation season 7

"Sub Rosa" is the 165th episode of the American science fiction television series Star Trek: The Next Generation. It was the 14th episode of the seventh season.

Dr. Crusher attends her grandmother's funeral, and spends time in her grandmother's haunted house, romanced by her grandmother's non-corporeal lover.

== Plot ==
The USS Enterprise visits Caldos IV to enable Dr. Beverly Crusher to attend the funeral of her grandmother, Felisa Howard. During the burial, Crusher sees a man she does not know who has obvious interest in the events. Later, Crusher enters her grandmother's house and collects several mementos, which she takes onto the Enterprise. Reading some diaries, she discovers that despite being 100 years old, her grandmother was involved with a 34-year-old man named Ronin.

Back on the planet, a groundskeeper of her grandmother's tells her that there is a ghost in her grandmother's house and that she should leave immediately. He also tells her that she should never light the candle her grandmother always carried, since this candle will wake up the ghost. Beverly hears a voice that tells her he is a ghost and loved her grandmother and now also loves Beverly. Finally he becomes visible, and Beverly sees a man of about 30 years.

Meanwhile, the colony is suffering from a major storm system, which the weather modification satellite is unable to correct. Data and Geordi attempt to fix the problem but are shocked to find Ned, the Howard groundskeeper, trying to stop them, before he is killed in an explosion.

The ghost called Ronin manipulates Beverly's mind so that she falls in love with him. Ronin tells her to light the candle, which is on the Enterprise. Beverly beams up and lights the candle, and Ronin appears. Beverly tells Captain Picard that she wants to leave the Enterprise and live on the planet. Reluctantly, Picard agrees. Picard goes to Counselor Deanna Troi, with whom Crusher spoke about Ronin before she left.

Troi tells Picard that Ronin is a very strange man, but they have to accept Beverly's decision. Then Picard beams down onto the planet and visits Beverly in her house. He wants to get to know Ronin, and finally Ronin appears. Picard asks questions which Ronin does not want to answer, and Ronin attacks him. Despite Ronin's objections, Beverly helps Picard.

At the cemetery, Geordi and Data have found an energy source in Beverly's grandmother's grave. They open the grave, and the grandmother rises and attacks them. Beverly arrives and orders Ronin to get out of her grandmother's body. Ronin does so and tells Beverly to give him the candle. She has by now discovered that he is an anaphasic alien who can only survive because the plasma-based candle is his energy receptacle. Beverly destroys the candle with a phaser and vaporizes Ronin when he attempts to possess her body.

Geordi and Data are treated and recover. As Picard's log states, "Doctor Crusher's recovery will be of a more personal nature." Troi and Crusher discuss the events in Ten Forward, where Crusher says that a part of her is a little sad. She says that her grandmother's journals reveal that "whatever else he might have done, he made her very happy."

== Reception ==
At a convention in the 1990s, Michael Dorn mocked the episode as being a ripoff of Anne Rice's The Witching Hour.

In 2016, fans at the 50th anniversary Star Trek convention voted "Sub Rosa" as the 6th worst episode of any Star Trek series. In 2017, it was ranked the 8th best romantic episode of Star Trek, noted for its exploration of sexual dreams.

In 2016, SyFy included this episode in a group of Star Trek franchise episodes they felt were commonly disliked but "deserved a second chance".

In 2017, this episode was noted as featuring scary and eerie Star Trek content.

In 2017, this episode was rated the 6th worst episode of the Star Trek franchise up to that time, by Screen Rant. In 2019, they ranked it the 8th worst episode of the franchise based IMDB rankings of all episodes up that time.

In 2019, ScreenRant included this episode on a list of bad one-off romances on the show, noting "There are so many fans who probably just prefer to forget about the fact Beverly and Ronin ever happened". The same article also called the episode “possibly the most infamous and hated TNG episode ever”.
