= Firstborn (Star Trek: The Next Generation) =

- Star Trek: The Next Generation episode
- Episode no.: Season 7 Episode 21
- Directed by: Jonathan West
- Story by: Mark Kalbfeld
- Teleplay by: René Echevarria
- Production code: 273
- Original air date: April 25, 1994

Guest appearances
- James Sloyan - K'mtar/Future Alexander; Brian Bonsall - Alexander Rozhenko; Gwynyth Walsh - B'Etor; Barbara March - Lursa; Joel Swetow - Yog; Colin Mitchell - Gorta; Armin Shimerman - Quark; Michael Danek - Kahless; John Kenton Shull - Molor; Rickey D'Shon Collins - Eric Burton

Episode chronology
← Previous "Journey's End"	Next → "Bloodlines"
- Star Trek: The Next Generation season 7

"Firstborn" is the 173rd episode of the American science fiction television series Star Trek: The Next Generation. The 21st episode of the seventh season. It was broadcast on television in April 1994.

Set in the 24th century, the series follows the adventures of the Starfleet crew of the Federation starship Enterprise-D. In this episode, Worf is visited by a mysterious Klingon saying Worf's brother Kurn sent him to help Alexander grow into becoming a Klingon warrior.

This episode has an appearance of the Duras Sisters who also appeared that same year in the feature film Star Trek Generations (1994).

== Plot ==
Worf is concerned that his son Alexander is not pursuing his Klingon heritage and has no desire to become a Klingon warrior. Captain Picard recommends that Worf should expose Alexander to more of his heritage at the Kot'baval festival at Maranga IV. When the Enterprise stops at Maranga IV as part of a routine mission, Worf takes Alexander to the festival and this appears to help Alexander become interested in the Klingon way of life. When the two of them are suddenly attacked by a trio of Klingon warriors, another Klingon arrives and helps them fight off the trio. He introduces himself as K'mtar, a gin'tak or adviser to the House of Mogh who has come to protect Worf. K'mtar joins Worf and Alexander as they return to the Enterprise while the crew investigates the attack.

With Worf's approval, K'mtar tries to train Alexander in the ways of the Klingon warrior, but this proves ineffective. K'mtar recommends that Worf send Alexander to a Klingon military academy, which would be harsh on Alexander but effective. Worf balks at the idea, and K'mtar threatens to invoke Klingon law to take custody of Alexander from Worf. When K'mtar pressures Alexander to join the academy, the boy refuses.

The Enterprise crew examine one of the daggers used during the attack on Worf and Alexander. It bears markings of the Duras sisters. Commander Riker gets intelligence from Quark at Deep Space Nine that helps the Enterprise crew locate the Duras sisters and accuses them of the assassination attempt. The sisters deny any involvement. When Worf presents the dagger, they recognize one marking as belonging to Lursa's son, despite the fact she has only just learned she has become pregnant.

Worf then finds K'mtar about to kill a sleeping Alexander, and immobilizes him. K'mtar is forced to reveal that he is really Alexander from 40 years in the future, having traveled back in time to prepare his younger self for an assassination attempt on his father. He had arranged the attack on Maranga IV to trigger a desire to protect Worf and had hoped to direct the young Alexander to take the warrior's path so as to prevent Worf's assassination later. Worf tells K'mtar that he could only die happy knowing that Alexander followed the course he wanted to take in life. With Worf's resolve and newfound appreciation for his son's interests, K'mtar is satisfied and returns to his own time.

== Reception ==
In 2019, the Nerdist ranked the future Alexander, K'mtar, as one of the top seven time travelers of the entire Star Trek franchise up to that time.

Time magazine rated Lursa and B'Etor (who appear in this episode) the 9th best villains of the Star Trek franchise in 2016.

In 2021, Screen Rant said this was an exploration of Father-Son relationships, as well as Klingon culture and noted the presence of the Duras Sisters.

== Video releases ==
This was released in Japan on LaserDisc on October 9, 1998 as part of the half-season collection Log.14: Seventh Season Part.2. This set included episodes from "Lower Decks" to Part II of "All Good Things", with English and Japanese audio tracks.
