= List of minor Star Trek: The Next Generation characters =

Fictional characters

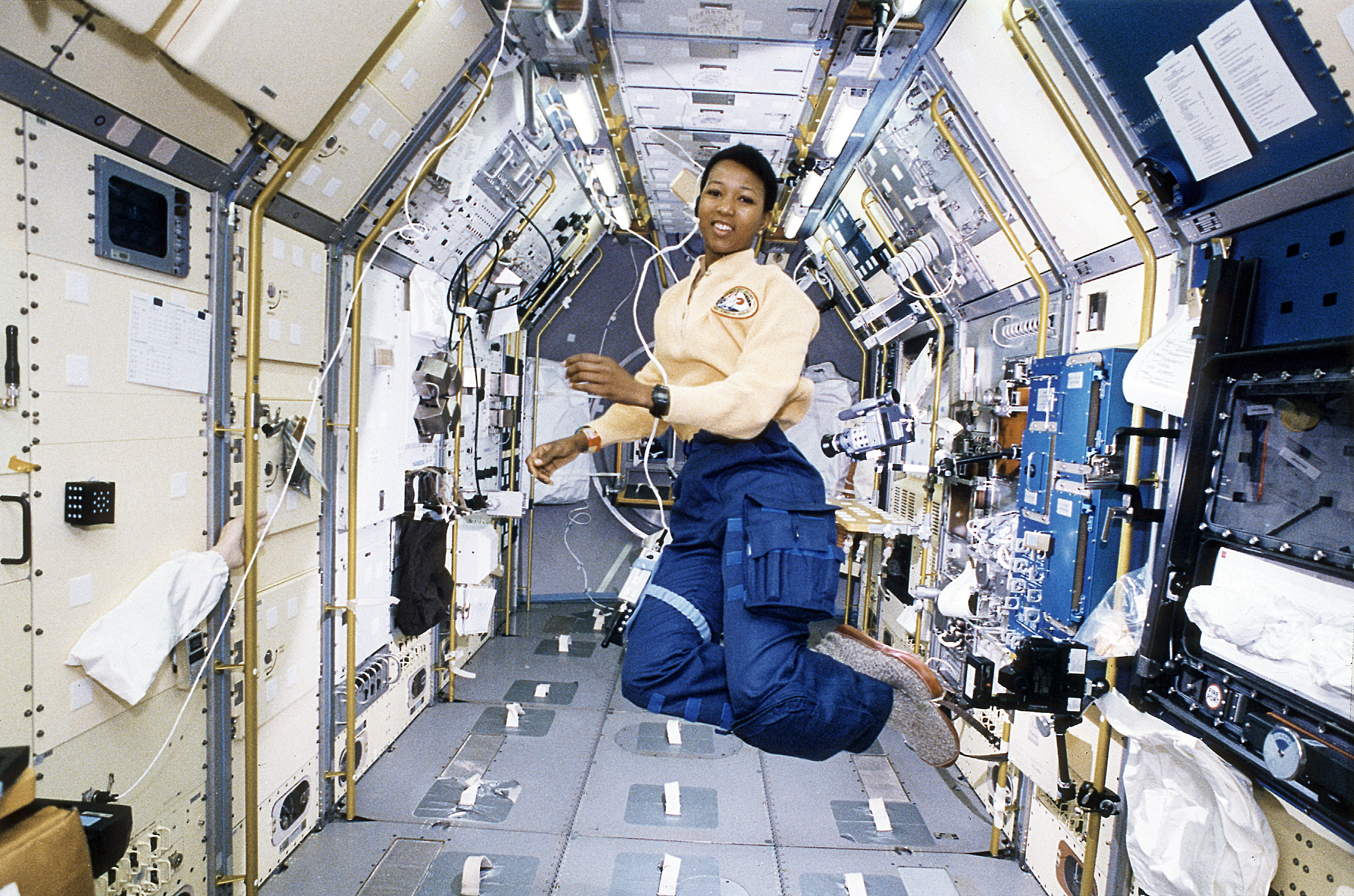
NASA Astronaut Mae Jemison, shown here on a Space Shuttle mission, played a Lieutenant on the Enterprise-D. Physicist Stephen Hawking also appeared on an episode as himself.

This is a list of minor characters from the science fiction television series Star Trek: The Next Generation. Characters are ordered alphabetically by family name, and only characters who played a significant recurring role in the series are listed.

For further information about the primary cast of this show see List of Star Trek: The Next Generation cast members. Due to the use of Star Trek characters elsewhere in the franchise and the frequent re-use of non-regular cast members, the order in which they appear in the list is necessarily imprecise.

== Overview ==
The line between the regular cast, a recurring character, and a guest star is sometimes a grey area on TNG. In particular, Tasha Yar was in 28 episodes, fewer than the recurring characters Guinan and O'Brien. Pulaski was given the credit line "special appearance by" for her Season 2 shows, also fewer than that of O'Brien (there are 178 episodes of TNG overall).

Two well-known people that had roles on Star Trek were the NASA astronaut Mae Jemison and astrophysicist Stephen Hawking.

== Jack Crusher ==
Jack Crusher
- Star Trek character
- Portrayed by: Doug Wert

In-universe information
- Species: Human
- Affiliation: United Federation of Planets; Starfleet
- Posting: USS Stargazer
- Rank: Lieutenant commander

Lieutenant Commander Jack R. Crusher was portrayed by actor Doug Wert. Dead before the series' beginning, Crusher is the late husband to Beverly Crusher, the father of Wesley Crusher and the former second officer (third in command) aboard the USS Stargazer, Jean-Luc Picard's first command. He was killed in action at the age of 32, for which Picard blamed himself until Beverly Crusher first reported on the USS Enterprise. Crusher assured Picard she had signed on the Enterprise-D voluntarily and not due to Picard's influence.

Jack Crusher once made a holographic recording of himself in which he explained his life and recent happenings to his son Wesley shortly after his birth. Crusher intended this to be the first in a series of messages, one every couple of years, but due to his death, only one recording was made. By the time Wesley first got to view the recording, Jack was already long dead.

In the seventh season episode "Journey's End", Jack appears before his son Wesley Crusher in a vision quest in which he encourages Wesley to find his own path. Wesley takes the vision of his father as a sign and resigns from Starfleet Academy in order to explore the galaxy with a powerful being known as the Traveler. In the third season of Star Trek: Picard, Beverly Crusher would reveal that she had a second child, with Picard, whom she named after Jack.

=== Appearances ===
Lieutenant Commander Crusher appears in the following Star Trek: The Next Generation episodes:

- "Family", episode # 402, via holographic recording
- "Violations", episode # 512, via Beverly's memory flashback
- "Journey's End", episode # 720, via Wesley's vision

== Guinan ==
Guinan
- Star Trek character
- First appearance: "The Child" (TNG)
- Portrayed by: Whoopi Goldberg

In-universe information
- Species: El-Aurian
- Affiliation: United Federation of Planets
- Posting: USS Enterprise-D
- Position: Bartender

Guinan, played by Whoopi Goldberg, is a recurring character on Star Trek: The Next Generation. She also appears in the TNG films Star Trek Generations and Star Trek: Nemesis but is uncredited in both.

The character first appears in the season two premier "The Child". She appears as a recurring guest between seasons 2 and 6. She does not appear at all in the final seventh season.

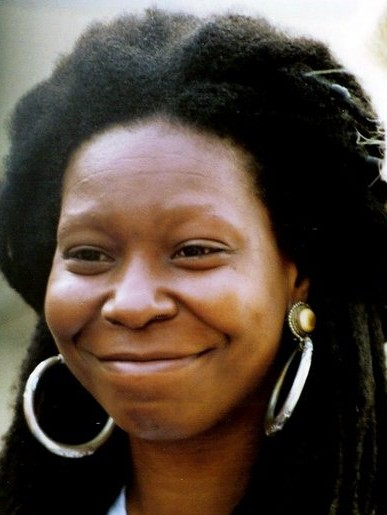
Whoopi Goldberg portrays Guinan

=== Casting ===
According to Whoopi Goldberg, she approached the producers of TNG with her desire to be on the show, due to her childhood admiration of Uhura, a character from the original Star Trek, played by actress Nichelle Nichols. Goldberg hoped to play the new ship's doctor after Gates McFadden was fired, but the producers did not see her as suitable for the role. They did not think a suitable role could be created, until Goldberg said that she did not care how big or small the role was, even if she just swept the floor in the background. It was from this they decided to give her the role of a bartender; the character is named after a Prohibition bartender, Texas Guinan.

=== Overview ===
Guinan is originally from El-Auria. Her people, the El-Aurians, are sometimes called the "listeners". As a refugee aboard the El-Aurian vessel Lakul, she is rescued from the Nexus by the USS Enterprise-B in the film Star Trek Generations. In "Best of Both Worlds, Part I", Guinan states that when the Borg destroyed her homeworld her people "were scattered throughout the universe." The subsequent diaspora and reintegration of her people, and even their traditional clothing, that Guinan still wears, are interpreted as a reference to questions about race and colonization.

Her species is long-lived, and she was between 500 and 700 years old when she joined the Enterprise-D: "Time's Arrow, Part I" reveals that she visited Earth in 1893, and "Rascals" establishes that her father was around 700 years old in the mid 24th century.

Guinan reveals in Star Trek: Nemesis that she has been married 23 times. She states in "Evolution" that she has many children, including a son who went through a phase when "he wouldn't listen to anybody" – something unusual "in a species of listeners".

Her wise counsel occasionally proves to be quite valuable to the crew. In one episode, for example, she tries to show Troi that she has other abilities she can use when Troi's confidence is shaken because her telepathic powers stop working temporarily. In particular, she and Picard are especially close, to where they trust one another implicitly, although the full nature of their connection is never revealed. She does indicate that Picard stood by her at a time when she was in serious trouble and that their relationship is "beyond friendship, beyond family" ("Best of Both Worlds, Part 2"). Also, she reveals that one of the first things she notices in men are their heads, having a fondness for bald men ("Booby Trap").

While by no means hostile or belligerent, she keeps an energy rifle of alien design behind the bar in Ten-Forward, which she used in the episode "Night Terrors" to quell a rowdy bar brawl. She also has exceptional aim, as seen when she was almost effortlessly able to outshoot Worf during a target practice session in the episode "Redemption, Part I".

In "Yesterday's Enterprise", which involves the timeline being altered, Guinan is able to sense the disruption, even though everyone else believes the altered reality is the natural course of events.

In "Q Who?", Q retorts, after hearing her called "Guinan" in the Enterprise-D's Ten-Forward lounge, "Guinan? Is that your name now?" He claims that Guinan, "is not what she appears to be." Q 'offered' to remove her from the Enterprise and Guinan raised her hands against him.

== Kurn ==
Kurn
- Star Trek character
- Portrayed by: Tony Todd

In-universe information
- Species: Klingon
- Affiliation: Klingon Empire; Bajoran Militia (temporary)
- Posting: USS Enterprise-D executive officer (temporary); IKS Hegh'ta commanding officer Klingon High Council; Deep Space Nine security officer (temporary)

Kurn, played by Tony Todd, is Worf's brother and a Commander in the Klingon Defense Force in Star Trek: The Next Generation and Star Trek: Deep Space Nine.

=== Officer exchange ===
Commander Kurn is introduced in the episode "Sins of the Father" as part of an officer exchange program, he is posted to the Enterprise (in exchange for Riker's earlier placement on a Klingon ship, depicted in "A Matter of Honor"), where he is temporarily assigned as first officer. Kurn specifically requests the Enterprise so that he can observe Worf closely, eventually revealing that he is Worf's younger brother.

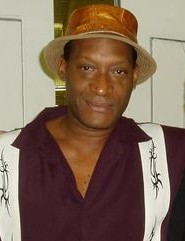
Tony Todd portrays Kurn

Kurn tells Worf he was too young to go along to Khitomer, where Worf had always thought that his entire family had died. The Starfleet officer who rescued Worf had been told by the Klingon government that he had no living relatives, but Kurn was taken in by his father's closest friend, Lorgh, and raised as Lorgh's son. At the age of ascension, Kurn was informed of his true bloodlines.

Kurn also informs Worf that the council has judged Mogh and his family to be traitors, and that Mogh had betrayed Khitomer to the Romulans. The Enterprise goes to Qo'noS so that Worf may challenge the accusation. Duras, the son of Mogh's greatest rival Ja'rod, leads the prosecution of Worf. Duras tries to have Kurn assassinated, but Kurn is rescued by the Enterprise personnel, and makes a full recovery. The Enterprise crew soon discovers that it is actually Ja'rod who collaborated with the Romulans. But K'mpec refuses to clear Mogh, and is prepared to execute Worf. Worf agrees to accept discommendation on the condition that Kurn's true bloodlines be kept secret, and that he be allowed to continue to serve.

=== Gowron's ascension ===
Worf meets with Kurn again right before the Klingon Civil War, in the two-part episode "Redemption". By this time, Kurn is a captain, and has his own vessel, the IKS Hegh'ta. When the two brothers save Gowron's life, Gowron (K'mpec's successor, thanks to Worf and Picard) returns to Worf and Kurn their family honor.

After the Klingon Civil War (during which Worf briefly serves on the Hegh'ta), Kurn becomes a member of the Klingon High Council. He serves in this position until the breakdown in relations between the Klingons and the Federation following the Klingon invasion of Cardassian space. When Worf refuses to join Gowron, Gowron casts him out of Klingon society. When that happens, Kurn is forced from his seat on the council. Kurn becomes concerned over the future of the family since he has no male heirs, making Worf's son Alexander the next leader of the house. Kurn worries that Alexander will not be ready to lead the house when the time comes.

=== Deep Space Nine ===
Kurn next appears in the Deep Space Nine episode "Sons of Mogh".

After being forced from the council, Kurn finds that he has lost the will to live. Kurn then goes to Deep Space Nine to ask his brother to kill him to restore his honor. Worf tries to fulfill Kurn's request but is stopped by Jadzia Dax and Odo. Captain Sisko is furious over this and forbids Worf from taking Kurn's life. Worf is then forced to try to get Kurn to regain his will to live. Odo agrees to make Kurn a member of the station security force. Kurn soon discovers a visitor is smuggling illegal items and the smuggler raises his gun at Kurn. In a twist of suicide by cop, despite having the ability to easily disarm the criminal, Kurn does nothing, and allows himself to be shot because dying in the line of duty would be an honorable death. Because a man with a death wish is a danger to himself and everyone else, Odo dismisses him from the security force. At about the same time, the Klingons are discovered attempting to mine the Bajoran system. Worf recruits Kurn to go onto a Klingon ship docked at the station, where they are able to uncover information about the mining program.

Realizing that his brother will never recover from his losses, Worf allows Dr. Julian Bashir to erase most of Kurn's memory. The procedure is successful: Kurn remembers nothing of his past life when he wakes up. Worf contacts an old family friend, Noggra, who agrees to take Kurn in as his son. Noggra tells Kurn that he has suffered an accident that has erased most of his memory, and that his name is Rodek.

A subsequent non-canon novel series (Star Trek: I.K.S. Gorkon/Star Trek: Klingon Empire) shows Kurn, in his new identity, continuing to serve the Klingon Empire aboard a Klingon Defense Force warship named for Chancellor Gorkon.

=== Reception ===
In March 2019, SyFy rated Kurn as the tenth greatest Klingon of the Star Trek franchise. They note he has good chemistry with Worf and "relishes every word" spoken.

Kurn was also in the 1998 computer game Star Trek: The Next Generation: Klingon Honor Guard, with voice acting by Tony Todd.

== Lore ==
Lore
- Star Trek character
- Portrayed by: Brent Spiner

In-universe information
- Species: Android

Lore (/ˈlɔːr/; played by Brent Spiner) is a prototype android and the "brother" of main character Data. In TNG, Lore is characterized as a frighteningly evil version of the android Data that massacres the colonists of their homeworld, Omicron Theta. Throughout the series, Lore is sometimes depicted as being almost charming and friendly and is able to manipulate Data through lies and emotions.

Including the film canon, Lore and Data also have another brother, B-4. However, while Data is advanced and B-4 is primitive, Lore is sophisticated, clever, jealous and self-serving, making him the evil triplet in the group.

Lore was introduced in the episode "Datalore", the episode in which he was activated. He returned in "Brothers" and in both parts of "Descent", at the end of which he was deactivated and dismantled. Lore returns in the third season of Star Trek: Picard.

=== Overview ===
Lore was constructed and activated before his brother, Data, on Omicron Theta. Unlike Data, Lore was programmed with emotions, but became emotionally unstable and developed megalomaniac tendencies. Lore perceived himself as superior to the human colonists and felt that they resented him due to his perceived superiority. His creator, Dr. Noonien Soong, whom Lore saw as a father figure, would later deactivate and disassemble Lore, constructing what Lore claimed was a "less-perfect android" – Data – without emotions or the capacity to use linguistic contractions. (The part about Data being "less-perfect" was a lie, as Soong later told Data in "Brothers"; the only real difference between the two of them "was some programming". [Lore's positronic net differed from Data's: it had a Type-"L" phase discriminator compared to Data's Type-"R". (TNG: "Time's Arrow")]) Soong planned on repairing Lore after building and testing Data, but before he could do that the colony was destroyed by the Crystalline Entity and Soong was forced to flee. Lore admits (in "Datalore") that, unknown to Soong or the colonists at the time, it was Lore himself who lured the Crystalline Entity to the colony.

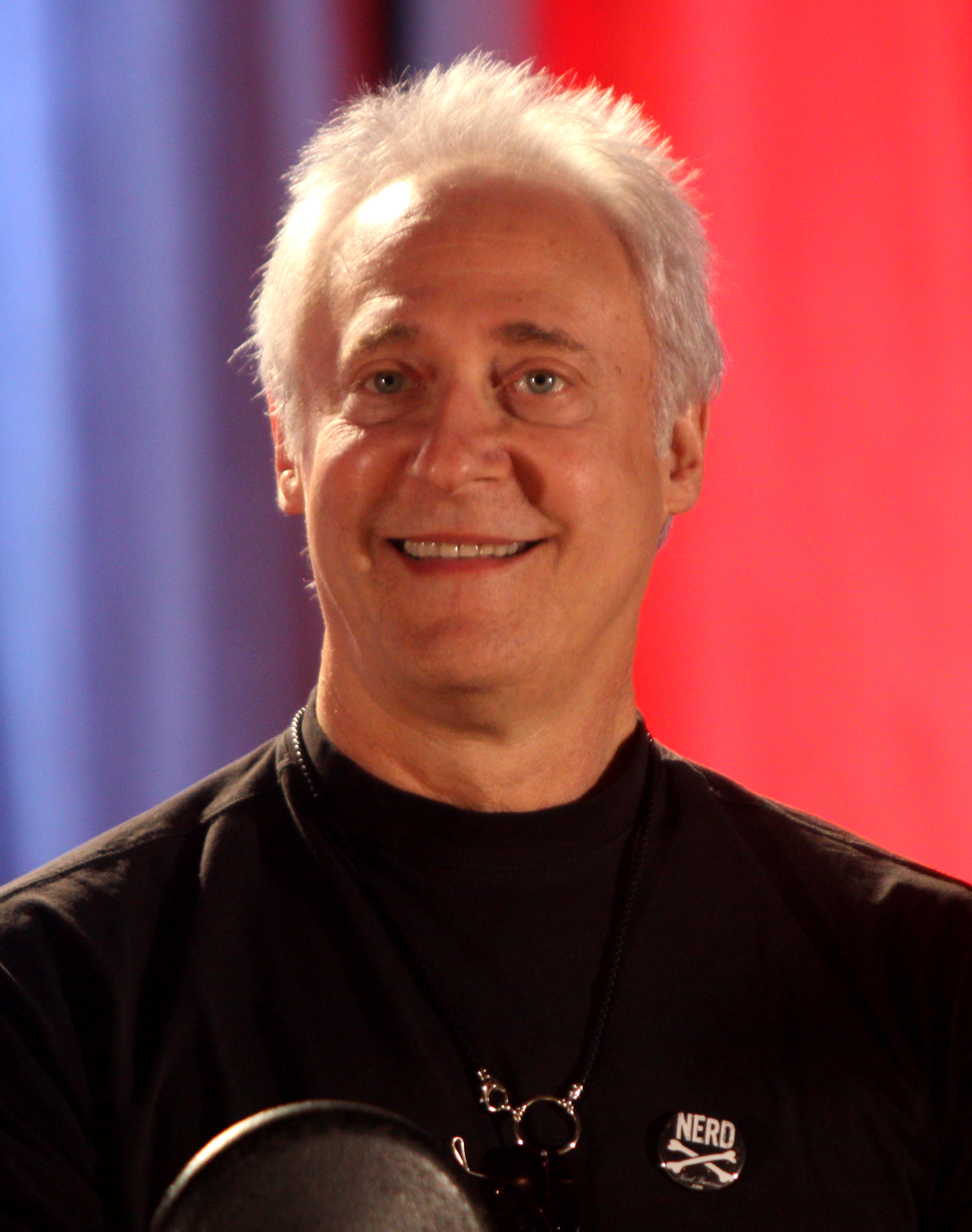
Brent Spiner portrays Data and his evil 'twin brother', Lore.

Lore's body parts were discovered in Soong's lab in the episode "Datalore", and he was rebuilt and reactivated. Although Lore initially appeared as inquisitive and harmless as Data, his true nature was gradually revealed during the episode. Lore secretly contacts the Crystalline Entity again, offering it the crew of the USS Enterprise as sustenance. However, Data foils his plans and transports Lore into space before the Crystalline Entity can attack, saving the ship.

In the episode "Brothers", Soong summons Data to Terlina III to give him an emotion chip. However, the same signal summons Lore, who had been found drifting in space and rescued by a group of Pakleds. In contrast to Data's stoicism, Lore is sympathetic and distraught upon learning of their "father's" terminal illness, but jealousy over his brother and resentment of his own uncorrected imperfections reassert themselves. Lore incapacitates Data and poses as him while Soong installs the chip. He then fatally wounds Soong before fleeing.

In "Descent, Part II", it is revealed that Lore, after his actions in "Brothers", found a group of Borg struggling with individuality following the Enterprise crew's actions in "I, Borg" and became their leader. Lore uses Soong's emotion chip to control Data until Geordi La Forge, Jean-Luc Picard and Deanna Troi manage to reactivate Data's ethical programming. Data shoots Lore at the end of the episode and then deactivates him, seemingly for good (retrieving his emotion chip afterwards). His final words (in his then-current body) to Data are "I love you... brother."

In the sixth episode of the third season of Picard, Lore is revealed to have been revived and partially merged with Data, B-4 and Soong's son Altan, inside a new android body, that Starfleet's most advanced weapons lab, the Daystrom Institute, has requisitioned. The new android entity contains valuable information on the lab's research projects, including the object stolen by the antagonists of the season: Picard's original dead body. The android is brought aboard the USS Titan. Lore's persona is separated from Data's, leading to a fight between the two over the android's control that ensues over the next two episodes, with Lore taking over the ship's systems and allowing the antagonists to seize the bridge. Eventually, Data realizes he cannot overpower Lore, but Lore lacks and envies the compassion and empathy Data developed. He offers his memories to Lore as a battle trophy; though in actuality, they are a Trojan horse. Data's memories consume Lore, destroying Lore permanently and allowing Data full control of the android body and the Titan.

=== Filming ===
Brent Spiner played Lore (and also Soong), except in some instances where a shooting double was necessary. In one scene in "Datalore", Lore puts down a glass of champagne that Data then picks up. This was achieved by the use of a moving split screen.

=== Reception ===
Time rated Lore as the sixth best villain of the Star Trek franchise in 2016.

== Lursa and B'Etor ==
Duras sisters
- Star Trek character
- Portrayed by: Lursa – Barbara March; B'Etor – Gwynyth Walsh

In-universe information
- Species: Klingon

The Klingon sisters Lursa (played by Barbara March) and B'Etor (played by Gwynyth Walsh) are collectively known as the Duras sisters, first appearing in TNG's "Redemption". The pair are daughters of Ja'rod and sisters of Duras. Like the other members of the House of Duras, they are villains; throughout their appearances, the characters attempt to destabilize the Klingon High Council and its relations with the United Federation of Planets. In Star Trek: Deep Space Nine's "Past Prologue", Lursa and B'Etor work with a Bajoran terrorist. Lursa is pregnant in "Firstborn".

In the film Star Trek Generations, the sisters align with Dr. Tolian Soran and attack the USS Enterprise-D. By capturing Chief Engineer Geordi La Forge and exploiting his VISOR, they are able to penetrate the Enterprise's defenses and severely damage the ship, leading to its eventual destruction, but not before the Enterprise destroys their Bird of Prey.

They are also in the 1998 computer game Star Trek: The Next Generation: Klingon Honor Guard, with voice acting by March and Walsh.

=== Appearances ===
Star Trek: The Next Generation

- "Redemption, Parts 1 and 2"
- "Firstborn"

Star Trek: Deep Space Nine

- "Past Prologue"

Feature films

- Star Trek Generations (1994)

=== Reception ===
Time rated Lursa and B'Etor ninth best villains of the Star Trek franchise in 2016.

== Alyssa Ogawa ==
Alyssa Ogawa
- Star Trek character
- First appearance: "Future Imperfect" (1990)
- Last appearance: First Contact (1996)
- Portrayed by: Patti Yasutake

In-universe information
- Species: Human
- Affiliation: United Federation of Planets; Starfleet
- Posting: USS Enterprise-D nurse USS Enterprise-E nurse
- Rank: Ensign; Lieutenant junior grade

Alyssa Ogawa, played by Patti Yasutake, is a character who appears in Star Trek: The Next Generation and the film Star Trek Generations as a nurse aboard the USS Enterprise-D and in Star Trek: First Contact in the same role aboard the USS Enterprise-E.

She joins the USS Enterprise-D in 2367 as an ensign in the medical department. In 2370, upon recommendation of Dr. Beverly Crusher, she is promoted to lieutenant junior grade (TNG: "Lower Decks"). She marries Lieutenant Andrew Powell in that year. Shortly after she reveals she is pregnant, Ogawa reports to the senior staff when an injury incapacitates Crusher (TNG: "Genesis"). She was still pregnant by the series finale (TNG: "All Good Things..."), and her baby's birth was never shown or referred to on television; while the finale depicted her losing her unborn baby due to the effects of an "anti-time" anomaly, this was part of an alternate timeline that Captain Jean-Luc Picard ultimately prevented from coming to pass. In an alternate timeline in the episode "Parallels", she makes a brief appearance as the ship's doctor with the apparent rank of commander.

According to the non-canon Star Trek: Titan book series, Ogawa works in Titan's sickbay. She marries Andrew Powell on the Enterprise-D. Powell is killed at the Battle of Rigel during the Dominion War. Ogawa and her young son transfer to the USS Titan under command of Captain Riker to serve in the sickbay.

=== Appearances ===
Ogawa appears in 16 episodes throughout seasons 4–7 of Star Trek: The Next Generation and the films Star Trek Generations and Star Trek: First Contact.

=== Reception ===
In 2016, marking the 50th anniversary of the first ever episode in the Star Trek franchise, Wired ranked Nurse Alyssa Ogawa as the 63rd most important character of Starfleet, within the entire body of the 30 seasons of the six television series and the 13 films then-aired in the franchise (15th most important of the Starfleet characters introduced in Star Trek: The Next Generation). In 2017, IndieWire ranked Ogawa as the eleventh best character on Star Trek: The Next Generation.

== Alexander Rozhenko ==
Alexander Rozhenko
- Star Trek character
- Portrayed by: Jon Paul Steuer; Brian Bonsall; James Sloyan; Marc Worden

In-universe information
- Species: Three-quarters Klingon, One-quarter Human
- Family: Worf (father); K'Ehleyr (mother)

Alexander Rozhenko is the son of Worf and Ambassador K'Ehleyr. He was conceived during the events of "The Emissary" and introduced to his father during "Reunion". After the death of his mother, he was sent to live with Worf's adoptive human parents, Sergei and Helena Rozhenko, until becoming too unruly and problematic for them to manage. He returned to live with Worf aboard the Enterprise-D until the end of the series at which time he returned to Earth. Later, as a youth, he joined the Klingon military in its battle against the Dominion where he ended up serving under his father, who was General Martok's first officer aboard the IKS Rotarran.

=== Appearances ===
Star Trek: The Next Generation

- "Reunion" – K'Ehleyr returns to the Enterprise with Alexander. K'Ehleyr dies, leaving Worf to look after Alexander (Worf later asks his human foster parents to look after his son). (Jon Paul Steuer)
- "New Ground" – Worf has to quickly learn about parenting when Alexander arrives to join him on the Enterprise. (Brian Bonsall)
- "Ethics" – Worf suffers a broken back and Alexander must come to terms with facing his father's possible death.
- "Cost of Living" – Deanna Troi's mother, Lwaxana, arrives on the Enterprise and develops a friendship with Alexander.
- "Imaginary Friend" – Alexander is on the receiving end when an (invisible) imaginary friend of a new girl on the starship causes havoc.
- "Rascals" – When Captain Picard and some other crew members are turned into children, Alexander helps them re-take the ship from intruders.
- "A Fistful of Datas" – Alexander, Worf and Deanna Troi take part in a Western recreation on the holodeck.
- "Firstborn" – Alexander's future self-travels back in time to convince the young Alexander to embrace his Klingon warrior heritage. (James Sloyan)

Star Trek: Deep Space Nine

- "Sons and Daughters" – Now a youth, an estranged Alexander is reunited with his father, and they are initiated into the house of Martok. (Marc Worden)
- "You Are Cordially Invited" – Alexander takes part in the wedding of his father, Worf, to Jadzia Dax.

== Lwaxana Troi ==
Lwaxana Troi
- Star Trek character
- First appearance: "Haven" (1987) (The Next Generation)
- Last appearance: "The Muse" (1996) (Deep Space Nine)
- Portrayed by: Majel Barrett

In-universe information
- Species: Betazoid

Lwaxana Troi (played by Majel Barrett-Roddenberry, wife of Star Trek creator Gene Roddenberry) is Enterprise Counselor Deanna Troi's Betazoid mother. Her complete title is "Lwaxana Troi, Daughter of the Fifth House, Holder of the Sacred Chalice of Riix, Heir to the Holy Rings of Betazed". She is depicted as a deeply caring and flamboyant person, whose telepathic abilities and blunt honesty often provoke controversy.

When she appears in episodes aboard the Enterprise, Captain Picard often goes to great lengths to avoid her.

Troi is the widow of Ian Andrew Troi and mother of Deanna Troi. She often refers to her daughter Deanna, as “Little One”, to which Deanna strongly objects. Deanna often feels embarrassed by her mother's eccentric personality and fashion sense.

Lwaxana will often try to convince Troi to leave the ship and settle down, something which angers Troi greatly, as she is happy on the Enterprise. During a mental breakdown in "Dark Page", Lwaxana accused William Riker of using Deanna and leaving her, an act she instantly apologized for when she was in her right mind.

She serves as the Betazoid ambassador to the Federation. As a Betazoid, she possesses telepathic abilities. She has visited the USS Enterprise-D on several occasions. Her appearances often involve her search for a husband, fixing her sights at various times on a diplomatic minister, an alien scientist forced to die by a mandatory cultural requirement, and Captain Picard.

Another plot line revolved around Deanna's older sister Kestra, who died in a childhood accident when Deanna was an infant. This also explains why Lwaxana refers to Deanna as "little one". When Lwaxana becomes comatose, Deanna explores her mother's mind and discovers the memories of Kestra.

During a visit to Deep Space Nine, Lwaxana is trapped in a malfunctioning turbolift with Odo; to ease his intense discomfort at being an object of curiosity, Lwaxana removes her wig and reveals that even a "solid" would enjoy the ability to change their shape once in a while.

In addition to Deanna and Kestra, Lwaxana also has a son whose father is a Tavnian named Jeyal. She briefly marries Odo to void Jeyal's claim to the child. The Star Trek original novels have suggested that her son is named Barin, but this has never been substantiated on the television series.

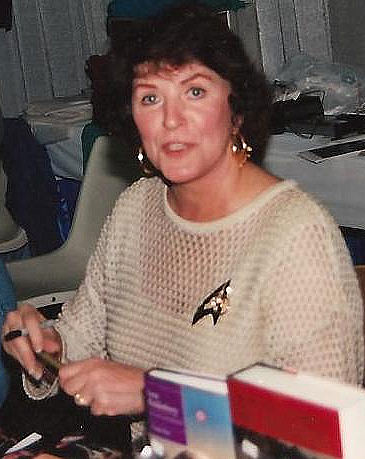
Majel Barrett portrayed Lwaxana Troi, Deanna's mother

=== Appearances ===
Star Trek: The Next Generation

- "Haven" – arrives to attend Deanna's arranged wedding to Wyatt Miller, which ends up not happening
- "Manhunt" – looks for new husband
- "Ménage à Troi" – kidnapped by a Ferengi
- "Half a Life" – discovers a scientist she has developed feelings for is required to end his own life
- "Cost of Living" – deals with mid-life crisis; mentors Alexander Rozhenko
- "Dark Page" – falls into a coma; Deanna aids in her recovery and in the process, learns of her sister, Kestra, and Kestra's death

Star Trek: Deep Space Nine

- "The Forsaken" – helps Odo deal with personal problems
- "Fascination" – becomes involved in a Bajoran love festival
- "The Muse" – marries Odo temporarily, to protect custody of her unborn son

Majel Barrett also played Number One, Nurse Christine Chapel, and often the voice of a Star Trek main computer.

=== Reception ===
In 2018, CBR ranked Lwaxana the fourth best recurring character of all Star Trek.

=== Mr. Homn ===
In most of her Star Trek: The Next Generation appearances, Lwaxana Troi travels with her extremely tall manservant, Mr. Homn (Carel Struycken). In The Ceremony of Innocence is Drowned, part of the non-canonical Tales of the Dominion War short story anthology, Homn is killed when the Jem'Hadar invade Betazed. Homn rarely speaks in his TNG appearances. His sole line of dialogue is in "Haven" when he says, "Thank you for the drinks."

== See also ==
- List of Star Trek characters: A–F
- List of Star Trek characters: G–M
- List of Star Trek characters: N–S
- List of Star Trek characters: T–Z
- List of minor recurring characters in Star Trek: Deep Space Nine
- List of minor recurring characters in Star Trek: Enterprise
- List of minor recurring characters in Star Trek: The Original Series
- List of minor recurring characters in Star Trek: Voyager
- List of Star Trek episodes
