= Wesley Crusher =

Character in the television series Star Trek: The Next Generation

- Wil Wheaton as Wesley Crusher
- First appearance: "Encounter at Farpoint" (1987)
- Last appearance: "Ouroboros, Part II" (2024)
- Created by: Gene Roddenberry; D. C. Fontana
- Portrayed by: Wil Wheaton

Wesley Crusher is a fictional character in the Star Trek franchise. He appears regularly in the first four seasons of the television series Star Trek: The Next Generation (TNG), and sporadically in its next three seasons. He also appeared in the feature film Star Trek: Nemesis (2002), in one episode apiece of the television series Star Trek: Picard (2022) and Star Trek: Lower Decks (2023), and as a main cast member in season 2 of Star Trek: Prodigy (2024). He is the son of Beverly Crusher and Jack Crusher and is portrayed by actor Wil Wheaton.

== Overview ==
=== Television series and films ===
In the television series Star Trek: The Next Generation, Wesley Crusher first arrives on the Enterprise-D with his mother, soon after Captain Jean-Luc Picard assumes command. His father was killed while under Picard's command, with Picard delivering the message to Wesley and to his mother, Beverly. Picard initially found Wesley irritating, as he is often uncomfortable around children, a fact he discloses to his first officer, Commander William Riker, in the pilot episode "Encounter at Farpoint".

In early episodes of the series, Picard does not allow Wesley on the ship's bridge. However, during the first season, Picard comes to realize that Wesley understands many things beyond his age, having inherited his mother's intelligence, and grants him more opportunities onboard. An alien known as the Traveler tells Captain Picard that Wesley possesses a unique intelligence and great potential when provided encouragement and opportunity, comparing him to a child prodigy like Mozart. Picard soon appoints Crusher as acting ensign.

In the episode "Coming of Age", Crusher takes the Starfleet Academy entrance exam, but fails to pass it. In the episode "Ménage à Troi", he misses his second chance to take the exam; but when he helps the Enterprise-D crew rescue Riker, Deanna Troi and Lwaxana Troi from hostile Ferengi, Picard grants him a field promotion to full ensign.

In the third-season episode "The Bonding", Crusher reveals that following his father's death, he felt animosity towards Picard, because Picard was in command of the Stargazer during the mission in which Wesley's father was killed. By the end of the episode, he no longer harbors these feelings.

The following year, Crusher is invited to re-take the Academy exam. He is accepted, and joins an elite group of cadets known as Nova Squadron. In the fifth-season episode "The First Duty", a squadron-mate is killed attempting a dangerous and prohibited flight maneuver and, under pressure from the team's leader, Nick Locarno, Crusher abets the squadron's efforts to cover up the truth. Although the Enterprise crew's intervention and Crusher's own testimony saves him from expulsion, Crusher's academic credits for the year are revoked; he is required to repeat the year and graduate after most of the rest of his class. He remains in the Academy until the Traveler recontacts him in a later season 7 episode, "Journey's End", where he resigns his commission and goes with the Traveler to explore other planes of reality.

Crusher is next seen sitting next to his mother in the background of the wedding scenes in the feature film Star Trek: Nemesis. In a scene deleted from the film, Captain Picard asks Crusher if he is excited to serve on board the USS Titan (Captain Riker's ship). Crusher tells him that he will be running the night shift in Engineering, which would have indicated that Wesley returned to Starfleet prior to the events of the film and held the rank of Lieutenant.

Crusher returns in the Star Trek: Picard season 2 episode "Farewell". In the years since Star Trek: Nemesis, he has rejoined the Travelers, traveling across space and time. In the year 2024, he approaches Kore Soong and reveals that he and his fellow Travelers were responsible for creating the Supervisors and the Watchers to help ensure the universe's survival. He offers Kore a position with the Travelers, although he can't guarantee her safety, and she accepts.

Crusher returns in the second season of Star Trek: Prodigy where he tries to help the young crew of the Protostar rescue Captain Chakotay from the future and then to deal with their inadvertent alterations to the timeline. In the first half of the season, Crusher acts from the shadows, sending disguised messages to the crew. Crusher eventually brings the young cadets to meet him in person, explaining that the temporal paradox is destroying their universe and while the other Travelers have abandoned it as a lost cause, Crusher is unwilling to give up on the universe that was his home and more importantly where his mother still lives. Crusher reveals that having studied billions of possible futures, there is only one where life in the galaxy doesn't end in endless suffering and that involves the seven cadets sticking together. As extra-dimensional scavengers called the Loom move to destroy the universe, Crusher helps the cadets find the Protostar and vanishes after promising to distract the Loom to buy them time.

In the second half of the season, Crusher is captured by Asencia and his mind probed to create temporal weaponry that she intends to use to destroy the Federation in a war. Crusher is eventually rescued by the cadets, but reveals that he had allowed himself to be captured in order to guide Asencia into creating the technology that they will need to send the Protostar back in time and restore the timeline. Although the Doctor is able to treat Crusher's injuries, the damage to his brain puts Crusher's Traveler powers out of commission for the time being. Working with Janeway to rescue the cadets, Crusher struggles to adjust to not being able to rely on his powers before Janeway reminds him that Crusher was a Starfleet officer before he was a Traveler and his natural talents are more valuable to them than his space-time powers. Given a confidence boost, Crusher plays a pivotal role in the rescue mission using his skills as a pilot and later his intellect to reprogram a tricorder to remotely bring their ship in for departure. Crusher later helps to figure out how to open the wormhole and chooses to accompany the Protostar along with the crew to see the mission through. Privately, Crusher reveals to Dal R'El that the important thing that he had predicted for the group to do that will shape the future of the galaxy is still yet to come. After the crisis is over, Crusher visits his mother for the first time in years and is introduced to his little brother Jack, having been rebuked by Janeway for not seeing his mother more often.

== Reception ==
The Wesley Crusher character was unpopular among some Star Trek fans. Many considered the character a Mary Sue, and a stand-in for Gene Roddenberry (whose middle name was Wesley). The character's role in the show was greatly downplayed after the first season when Roddenberry's involvement in the show's production became more peripheral.

Some fans disliked the idea of a boy who seemed to regularly save the whole ship using a deus ex machina plot device. Commentators have observed at least seven times in which Crusher, "who has trouble getting into the Starfleet Academy" and is on a ship "filled with Starfleet's best and brightest crew members", has come up with "the needed solution". Fans' dislike for Crusher has become something of a pop-culture meme, reflected in other TV shows such as The Big Bang Theory, the English dub of Steins;Gate, and in a 2009 Family Guy episode, "Not All Dogs Go to Heaven", which included the main The Next Generation cast and featured Wil Wheaton in character as Crusher being bullied by Patrick Stewart.

Wheaton wrote: "When I was younger, people gave me such a hard time about Wesley Crusher, there was a time in my late teens and early twenties when I resented Star Trek. It felt so unfair that people who had never met me were so cruel and hateful toward me as a person because they didn’t like a character I played on a TV show, I wanted to put Star Trek behind me and forget that it was ever part of my life."

In a 2016 issue of Wired magazine, Wesley Crusher was ranked 31st of the 100 most important Starfleet characters in the Star Trek science fiction universe.
