= Lower Decks (Star Trek: The Next Generation) =

- Star Trek: The Next Generation episode
- Episode no.: Season 7 Episode 15
- Directed by: Gabrielle Beaumont
- Story by: Ronald Wilkerson; Jean Louise Matthias
- Teleplay by: René Echevarria
- Production code: 267
- Original air date: February 7, 1994

Guest appearances
- Dan Gauthier – Sam Lavelle; Shannon Fill – Sito Jaxa; Alexander Enberg – Taurik; Bruce Beatty – Ben; Patti Yasutake – Alyssa Ogawa; Don Reilly – Joret Dal

Episode chronology
← Previous "Sub Rosa"	Next → "Thine Own Self"
- Star Trek: The Next Generation season 7

"Lower Decks" is the 167th episode of the American science fiction television series Star Trek: The Next Generation. It is the 15th episode of the seventh season.

Set in the 24th century, the series follows the adventures of the Starfleet crew of the Federation starship Enterprise-D. In this episode, during the Enterprise's promotion evaluation process, four junior officers find themselves involved in a top-secret mission.

This episode is noted for focusing on a group of junior officers on the Enterprise, rather than the senior officers who make up the series's main cast, and for its emotional impact. The junior officer killed in this episode was previously introduced in the episode "The First Duty". It has been rated highly among the series' episodes.

== Plot ==
Four young Enterprise ensigns find their friendship strained during personnel evaluations. Two of the friends, Sam Lavelle and the Bajoran Sito Jaxa, discover that they are being considered for the same job. Joined by their friend Ben, a civilian who works as a waiter, they learn that promotions seem to be already decided on for their other two friends, Nurse Ogawa and Vulcan engineer Taurik.

Worf soon detects an escape pod inside Cardassian space, which is off limits to the Enterprise, and Geordi and Taurik work to transport the passenger on board amidst a cloak of secrecy. Taurik burns the hull of a shuttlecraft with phaser fire on Geordi's instructions, and deduces that the goal is to make the craft appear as if it sustained damage while fleeing an attack.

Impressed by Ogawa's performance, Beverly Crusher decides to recommend her for promotion. She orders Ogawa not to reveal what she is about to see in Sickbay, and Dr. Crusher takes her to where an injured Cardassian has been brought on board.

Captain Picard chastises Sito for her role in a Starfleet Academy scandal. She leaves the meeting exasperated, as Picard has left her without the opportunity to defend herself. A pair of poker games take place, one involving the senior officers and another the junior officers, with Ben shuttling from one to the other. During the senior game, Commander Riker and Worf differ on whether Lavelle or Sito should be promoted, with Riker noting that Lavelle seems overly eager to please. Considerations of promotions are interrupted by a baffling secret mission that all but Lavelle are involved in. Left out of the loop, Lavelle becomes convinced that this is a sign that he will not be promoted.

After teaching a martial arts class, Worf tells Sito to stay and take a test for admission to his advanced course. He blindfolds her and engages her in a one-on-one fight. Sito is powerless to stop Worf's attacks, adding insult to her already bruised self-esteem, but finally stands up to him, saying that the test is unfair. Worf admits that getting her to stand up for herself when she is being judged unfairly is what he intended all along. She uses her newfound confidence to confront Picard about his earlier interrogation. To Sito's surprise, Picard admits that its purpose was to assess both her personal growth and her potential readiness for a dangerous secret mission. He also states that he had specifically asked for her assignment to the ship so she would be given a fair chance. Sito is to pose as a captive of Joret Dal, the injured Cardassian brought to Sickbay. Joret is actually a Federation operative who has just delivered vital information to Starfleet and must now return to Cardassia. The plan is for Joret and Sito to enter Cardassian space in the "stolen" shuttlecraft damaged by Taurik, and for Joret to send an "escaping" Sito back over the border in an escape pod. Acknowledging the risks, Sito accepts the mission and leaves to prepare.

When Sito's escape pod fails to arrive at the prearranged rendezvous point after 32 hours, Picard orders a probe to be launched into Cardassian space, despite being warned that doing so could be considered a treaty violation. The probe detects scattered debris that appears to be the remnants of a Starfleet shuttle escape pod. The Enterprise later intercepts Cardassian communications which report that a Bajoran prisoner overpowered her Cardassian captor and attempted to leave Cardassian space in an escape pod, which was then destroyed, leaving no survivors. Captain Picard announces Sito's death over the ship's general address, to the shock and horror of her friends.

Later in Ten Forward, Sito's friends are downhearted, mourning her loss while gloomily celebrating Lavelle's promotion. Ben notices Worf mourning Sito's death in a lone table on the other end of Ten Forward. Worf rebuffs Ben's attempt to get him to join the junior officers, concerned that he will not be welcome since he was Sito's commanding officer. Ben assures Worf that Sito considered him a personal friend. Worf moves to the juniors' table and is welcomed by them.

== Home video releases ==
This was released in Japan on LaserDisc on October 9, 1998 as part of the half-season collection Log.14: Seventh Season Part.2. This set included episodes from "Lower Decks" to Part II of "All Good Things", with English and Japanese audio tracks.

== Reception ==
"Lower Decks" has been consistently rated among the best episodes of Star Trek: The Next Generation and in the Star Trek franchise. Grunge.com noted that the finale of "Lower Decks" is one of the saddest moments in Star Trek, and Screen Rant included it in their review of the franchise's most heartbreaking moments.

The 2012 book, Star Trek: The Next Generation 365 notes that "Lower Decks" was an early example of a continuing story in Star Trek, with Sito Jaxa's story being continued from "The First Duty", earlier in the show's run.

In 2016, The Hollywood Reporter rated "Lower Decks" as the 50th best television episode of all Star Trek franchise television prior to Star Trek: Discovery. In May 2019, they ranked it among the top 25 episodes of Star Trek: The Next Generation, noting that it shifted the focus away from the usual main cast of bridge officers and explored tensions between the Star Trek aliens of Bajor and Cardassia.

In 2016, Empire ranked it the 49th best out of the top 50 episodes of all the 700-plus Star Trek television episodes. It remarked that the episode was a change of pace for the show late in its run, focusing on a new group of characters and showing how they interacted with the main cast.

In 2017, Den of Geek listed "Lower Decks" as one of the series's top ten groundbreaking episodes. They noted how it drew the audience in to caring about the ensign, whereas usually the loss of crew didn't connect with the audience in the same way. The same year, they ranked the episode one of the 25 "must-watch" episodes of Star Trek: The Next Generation.

In 2018, Io9 suggested using this episode as the concept for an entire new Star Trek show that focused on lower ranking crew aboard a starship. It was announced a few months later that production would begin on a new animated series, Star Trek: Lower Decks.

In 2019, Screen Rant ranked "Lower Decks" the fifth best episode of Star Trek: The Next Generation, and again in 2020.

Variety listed "Lower Decks" as one of the top 15 episodes of Star Trek: The Next Generation.

In 2019, The Hollywood Reporter ranked "Lower Decks" as one of the top 25 episodes of the series. They note how the episode focused on lower ranking characters on the Starship for a change, and also tied into the universe's Bajoran-Cardassian conflict.

== Influence ==
"Lower Decks" proved influential on later television writers. In his "Production Notes: Doodles in the Margins of Time" (2007), Doctor Who executive producer Russell T Davies cited "Lower Decks" along with the Buffy the Vampire Slayer episode "The Zeppo" as an influence on his 2006 Doctor Who episode "Love & Monsters". The episode provided a television format which came to be known as the "Doctor-lite episode", an annual tradition for Doctor Who since 2006.

"Lower Decks" inspired the premise and title of the series Star Trek: Lower Decks, an animated comedy series set in the Star Trek universe which also focuses on junior officers on a Starfleet ship. The show's fourth season features a story arc involving characters from "The First Duty", in which main character Beckett Mariner's friendship with Sito serves as a source of longstanding distress following Sito's death. Shannon Fill reprised the role of Sito Jaxa in a flashback during this time.
