= The First Duty =

- Star Trek: The Next Generation episode
- Episode no.: Season 5 Episode 19
- Directed by: Paul Lynch
- Written by: Ronald D. Moore; Naren Shankar
- Production code: 219
- Original air date: March 30, 1992

Guest appearances
- Wil Wheaton - Wesley Crusher; Ray Walston - Boothby; Robert Duncan McNeill - Nicholas Locarno; Ed Lauter - Lt. Cmdr. Albert; Richard Fancy - Capt. Satelk; Jacqueline Brookes - Admiral Brand; Walker Brandt - Jean Hajar; Shannon Fill - Sito Jaxa

Episode chronology
← Previous "Cause and Effect"	Next → "Cost of Living"
- Star Trek: The Next Generation season 5

"The First Duty" is the 119th episode of the American syndicated science fiction television series Star Trek: The Next Generation, the 19th episode of the show's fifth season. It featured the return of former regular castmember Wil Wheaton as Wesley Crusher as well as the first of three appearances by Ray Walston as Boothby.

Set in the 24th century, the series follows the adventures of the Starfleet crew of the Federation starship Enterprise-D. In this episode, while visiting Starfleet Cadet Wesley Crusher at Starfleet Academy, the crew learn of an accident that claimed the life of a cadet.

== Plot ==
"The first duty of every Starfleet officer is to the truth.”

— Captain Picard

The Enterprise returns to Earth, where Captain Picard is scheduled to deliver the commencement address at Starfleet Academy's graduation ceremony. However, the Academy superintendent informs Picard of an accident during flight training that has injured Wesley Crusher and caused the death of Joshua Albert, a member of the Nova Squadron flight team on which Wesley serves.

During an Academy inquiry, team leader Nick Locarno testifies that the collision occurred while they were executing a "Yeager Loop" maneuver in orbit above Saturn's moon Titan. He also states that Joshua had been nervous about flying, but Nick had kept him on the team out of a desire not to end his flying career. Nick claims that the accident was Joshua's fault, but admits that allowing him to fly was an error on his own part. Satellite imagery shows the team's ships to have been in a different formation from that described; these records, combined with the cadets' sudden reticence to explain their actions, prompt Picard to direct his crew to open an investigation of their own.

Picard and his crew discover evidence to suggest that Nova Squadron had actually been performing a maneuver called the "Kolvoord Starburst", last attempted at the Academy more than a century earlier; it was banned following a training accident that killed all five cadets involved. Pressed by Picard to admit the truth, Wesley instead chooses not to answer. Reminding Wesley that the first duty of any Starfleet officer is to the truth — scientific, historical, and personal — Picard threatens to reveal the facts to the board of inquiry unless Wesley does so himself at the next day's hearing. Nick tries to coerce Wesley into corroborating the other survivors' accounts of the accident, claiming that Picard has no solid evidence; Wesley is torn between loyalty to his friends and duty to Starfleet.

The next day, the admiral in charge of the inquiry prepares to dismiss it since there is no conclusive proof of any wrongdoing beyond the minor infractions that the cadets have admitted to committing. Before she can do so, though, Wesley confesses that Nova Squadron had indeed tried to execute the Kolvoord Starburst. Nick subsequently takes full responsibility, stating that he pressured the rest of the team into performing it and lying to cover up the facts. He is expelled from Starfleet Academy, while Wesley and the other two survivors lose their flight privileges and a year's worth of academic credits. Wesley is disappointed in himself, and Picard tells him that the immediate future will be difficult since everyone on campus will know what happened. As the two part, Picard recalls a remark by Boothby, the old groundskeeper at the Academy, who had once given him some much-needed advice: "You knew what you had to do. I just made sure you listened to yourself."

== Reception and impact ==
Keith DeCandido of Tor.com gave the episode a rating of 6 out of 10. It ranked ninth in Entertainment Weekly's list of top 10 Star Trek: The Next Generation episodes in September 2007.

Sito Jaxa, one of the other cadets involved in the accident, later made a prominent appearance in the Star Trek: The Next Generation season 7 episode "Lower Decks." Now holding the rank of Ensign, she learned that Picard had specifically requested her for his crew in order give her a fair chance to redeem herself. She was ranked as the 86th most important character of Starfleet within the Star Trek science fiction universe by Wired Magazine in 2016.

Robert Duncan McNeill's Nicholas Locarno served as the template for the character of Tom Paris on Star Trek: Voyager. When casting Paris, producers were searching for a different actor than McNeill. After many auditions it was suggested to simply bring McNeill in to play the part since they were using his character as a model for Tom Paris already.

The A.V. Club noted that the episode was the first to feature Starfleet Academy, as well as the first to feature Boothby. The review also highlighted a line from Picard's lecture to Wesley: "The first duty of every Starfleet officer is to the truth."

Geek.com rated Picard's lecture as the fourth greatest moment in Star Trek overall. Space.com ranked Picard's truth speech one of the character's top ten moments.

Nicholas Locarno would later return as the main antagonist of Star Trek: Lower Decks season 4, now an independent civilian pilot and the leader of Nova Fleet who was still bitter about the events of "The First Duty" even thirteen years later. The season finale, "Old Friends, New Planets," contains a flashback to shortly before the events of "The First Duty" featuring Nova Squadron discussing their plans for the Kolvoord Starburst, showing that both Crusher and Cadet Albert had their doubts but were pressured by Locarno. At the end of that episode, the detonation of a Ferengi Genesis Device involving Locarno emitted the Kolvoord Starburst in the process of creating a new planet.

A new version of Nova Squadron and Wesley Crusher returned for the second season of Star Trek: Prodigy with Wesley's previous role in the squadron being briefly mentioned as one of his achievements. In the episode "Ascension, Part II," Nova Squadron destroyed an enemy ship using a move that no one had ever pulled off before called the Boothby Supernova, named for Ray Walston's character Boothby.

== Releases ==
The episode was later released in the United States on November 5, 2002, as part of the season five DVD box set. The first Blu-ray release was in the United States on November 18, 2013, followed by the United Kingdom the next day, November 19, 2013.

== See also ==
- "Lower Decks", the seventh season episode prominently featuring then-Ensign Sito Jaxa.
- Star Trek: Lower Decks season 4, featuring the return of Nick Locarno who has become bitter over the events of "The First Duty."
- Dump and Burn
- Immelmann turn
