= Deanna Troi =

Fictional character from Star Trek

- Star Trek character
- Marina Sirtis as Deanna Troi
- First appearance: "Encounter at Farpoint" (1987) (The Next Generation)
- Created by: Gene Roddenberry; D. C. Fontana
- Portrayed by: Marina Sirtis

In-universe information
- Species: Betazoid (maternal); Human (paternal)
- Affiliation: United Federation of Planets; Starfleet
- Family: Ian Andrew (father, deceased); Lwaxana Troi (mother); Kestra Troi (sister, deceased); Unnamed half-brother
- Spouse: William Riker
- Children: Ian Troi, II (deceased); Thaddeus Troi-Riker (deceased); Kestra Troi-Riker
- Posting: USS Titan (NEM, LDS); USS Enterprise-E (FCT, INS, VOY, NEM); USS Enterprise-D (Seasons 1–7, GEN)
- Position: Diplomatic Officer (USS Titan); Counselor (USS Enterprise-E, USS Enterprise-D)
- Rank: Commander (Season 7, films); Lieutenant Commander (Seasons 1–7)

Deanna Troi is a main character in the science-fiction television series Star Trek: The Next Generation and related TV series and films, portrayed by Marina Sirtis. Troi is half-human, half-Betazoid, and has the psionic ability to sense emotions. She serves as the ship's counselor on USS Enterprise-D. Throughout most of the series, she holds the rank of lieutenant commander. In the seventh season, Troi successfully passes the bridge officer's examination, gaining promotion to the rank of commander while maintaining her role as counselor.

Troi appears in all four Next Generation theatrical films. She has also made guest appearances on Voyager, Enterprise, Picard and Lower Decks.

Troi's romantic interests, family and personal life are plot elements in many Star Trek: The Next Generation episodes.

== Depiction ==
Deanna Troi was born on March 29, 2336, near Lake El-Nar, Betazed. Troi's parents are Betazoid Ambassador Lwaxana Troi (portrayed by Majel Barrett) and deceased human Starfleet officer Lt. Ian Andrew Troi (portrayed by Amick Byram). An older sister, Kestra, died in a drowning accident during Troi's infancy. Although Deanna Troi has little exposure to Earth culture, she attended Starfleet Academy from 2355 to 2359, as well as the University of Betazed, and earned an advanced degree in psychology. As part of Betazoid aristocratic culture, Deanna, like her mother, is a Daughter of the Fifth House.

Deanna Troi serves as the ship's counselor aboard the Starfleet starships USS Enterprise (NCC-1701-D) and Enterprise-E under the command of Captain Jean-Luc Picard. In Star Trek: Nemesis, Troi leaves the Enterprise with her new husband, William Riker, who has just been promoted to captain of the USS Titan.

Troi's empathic abilities prove key to the main shows, and other popular areas are her relationships and sexuality. In "The Child," she gives birth to an alien child.

The Betazoid race has telepathic abilities. Due to her half-human heritage, Troi has only partial telepathic abilities and, as a result, is more of an empath with clairsentience. In Star Trek: Nemesis, Troi has expanded her empathic abilities; she is able to connect to another psychic and follow that empathic bond to its source. In this instance, her ability enables Enterprise-E to target and hit the Romulan vessel Scimitar, despite the fact that it is cloaked. She is also able to communicate telepathically with her mother and other telepathic Betazoids or races with sufficient aptitude. Several species are resistant to the telepathy and empathy of Betazoids, such as the Ferengi, the Breen and the Ulians.

Early in the series, Troi finds herself working with a former lover, the newly assigned first officer of the USS Enterprise, Commander William Riker. In season one, she meets a potential spouse in "Haven," In later episodes, Troi has romantic involvements with several others, including a brief relationship with Klingon Starfleet officer Lieutenant Worf. A major exploration of their relationship begins with "Parallels," in which Worf encounters parallel universes where they are married with children. Another episode that explores a Troi-Worf relationship is "Eye of the Beholder". However, in both cases, they are not revealed to be dating aboard the "real" ship, although both episodes are oriented towards exploring this concept. In "All Good Things...," the beginnings of a real-world relationship are briefly explored, though this is abruptly dropped as Worf explores other love interests in Star Trek: Deep Space Nine, and Troi's romantic relationship with Riker is rekindled through the Next Generation films.

As a main cast member, Troi appears in nearly every TNG episode. However, particular episodes, starting with "The Child," feature her as the primary protagonist. Her name is included in the show title "Ménage à Troi," which is oriented towards an adventure she and her mother have (besides Data and Q, this is one of the few cases where a character's name is in the episode title). Other episodes principally about Troi include: "Face of the Enemy," "Man of the People," "Violations" and "Night Terrors." The Season 7 episode "Thine Own Self" deals with Troi's attempts to pass the bridge officer's exam; she succeeds after several attempts and is promoted to Commander.

Fellow officers address her in various ways. Captain Picard calls her "Counselor," but when he is concerned about her or in emergencies, he calls her "Deanna." Picard also refers to her as "Commander" in the pilot episode, "Encounter at Farpoint," which is consistent with her uniform's rank pips. In the pilot episode, Riker addresses her as "Lieutenant" only once; he does not refer to her service rank again for several seasons. Doctor Crusher (one of her most noted female friends) usually calls her "Troi." Data rarely uses her first name, preferring to call her "Counselor Troi." Depending on the situation, Commander Riker calls her "Deanna" or "Imzadi," which means "beloved" in the Betazoid language.

In several episodes, Troi falls victim to aliens. In an episode of season four ("Clues"), the Enterprise’s crew loses a day's memory. An entity takes over Troi to communicate with the crew as events unfold. She temporarily gains "superhuman" strength and effortlessly tosses Worf across the bridge, breaking his wrist. In the season-five episode, "Violations," the Enterprise encounters an alien species who are telepathic and specialize in being able to bring back lost memories. One of the aliens mentally assaults Deanna and also tries to physically assault her in her quarters. Worf and one of his security teams save her. In the film Star Trek: Nemesis, Shinzon's telepathic viceroy violates her mental integrity. This violation occurs in her quarters when she is with her new husband, Commander Riker; it also occurs in the Star Trek: Nemesis bonus deleted scenes, where she is attacked in the turbolift. Eventually, she uses the same connection to flip the tables on the viceroy.

Troi is an avid connoisseur of chocolate. This fact is significant in multiple episodes, including one in which she tells Commander Riker how to properly enjoy eating it. In the episode "Remember Me," Beverly Crusher briefly describes Troi to Captain Picard to jog his memory and mentions that she "loves chocolate." She is known for ordering chocolate-flavored desserts in Ten-Forward, and her love for desserts is frequently mentioned in the series. She talks about this with a visiting alien ambassador in "Liaisons," who takes up her love for desserts, as in their culture they do not have this type of food.

Dream-themed episodes include "Phantasms," where Troi appears as cake in Data's dream, and in "Night Terrors," her dreams help save the ship. The dreams a suitor thinks he is having about her in "Haven" become a major plot point in that episode.

== Development and casting ==
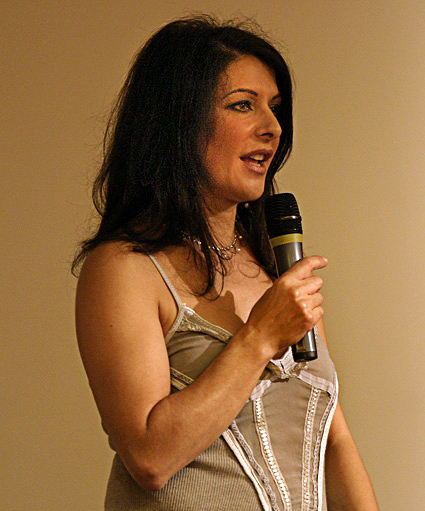
Marina Sirtis is cast as Deanna Troi, a half-Betazoid Starfleet officer that uses her telepathic abilities to navigate her duties and personal life.

Marina Sirtis at first read for the role that would become Tasha Yar in 1986. She had, in total, five readings, all with Gene Roddenberry and other executives. Roddenberry took a liking to her almost immediately. Denise Crosby, who eventually won the role of Tasha, auditioned for the role of Deanna Troi. Sirtis was said to have had a more "exotic" feel about her.

She was just about to return home, in debt and jobless, when she received the phone call alerting her that she had the role of Deanna Troi. She said she would have missed the call and been on her way to England if it had been an hour later. Sirtis' US visa was expiring that day, and if she had stayed any longer, she could have run into legal trouble.

For Sirtis, Star Trek was her first big break. Prior to Deanna Troi, her acting career was going nowhere: "What they told us about The Next Generation when we started was that we were guaranteed 26 episodes. So that was the longest job I've ever had."

Series creator Gene Roddenberry initially intended Troi to be "eye candy": beautiful, sexy, and not very bright. He also conceptualized her as having four breasts, before his wife told him this was a bad idea. Prior to filming, Sirtis was told to lose 5 lb (2.3 kg); however, she thought that she had to drop even more and was often wearing plunging necklines and form-fitting dresses. After six years, the producers decided to drop the "sexy and brainless" Troi and make her a stronger character, represented by changing her outfit to a standard crew uniform:

I was thrilled when I got my regulation Starfleet uniform... it covered up my cleavage and I got all my brains back, because when you have cleavage, you can't have brains in Hollywood... I was allowed to do things that I hadn't been allowed to do for five or six years. I went on away teams, I was in charge of staff, I had my pips back, I had phasers, I had all the equipment again, and it was fabulous. I was absolutely thrilled.

== Reception ==
One reviewer compared her to Leonard McCoy from the original Star Trek television series. In 2018, CBR ranked Counselor Troi as the 25th-best Starfleet character of Star Trek. In 2017, IndieWire ranked Troi as the 9th-best character on Star Trek: The Next Generation.

In 2016, Troi was ranked as the 24th-most important character of Starfleet within the Star Trek universe by Wired.

In 2017, Screen Rant ranked Troi the 12th-most attractive person in the Star Trek universe.

In 2018, CBR ranked Troi the 25th-best member of Starfleet.

In 2019, Troi was ranked the sixth-sexiest Star Trek character by SyFy.

In 2020, Tom's Guide recommended the Star Trek: The Next Generation episodes "Ménage à Troi", "Face of the Enemy" and "Thine Own Self" as having some of the best moments for this character.

In 2020, SyFy Wire was very positive about her performance in the Star Trek: Picard episode "Nepenthe," explaining that "It features Deanna Troi at her very best, with Marina Sirtis at the height of her powers."

== Franchise appearances ==
Besides being a regular in The Next Generation and its films, Deanna Troi appears in three episodes of Star Trek: Voyager ("Pathfinder," "Life Line," and "Inside Man") together with Reginald Barclay, and in the final episode of Star Trek: Enterprise, "These Are the Voyages...," with William Riker.

Troi appears in the Star Trek: Picard season 1 episode "Nepenthe," set twenty years after Nemesis where she is married to Riker and they have two children, Thad and Kestra. Deanna and her husband extend a warm welcome to Jean-Luc Picard and his android companion Soji when they visit the Rikers' home. Deanna and Will are both retired from Starfleet, although Will is described as being on "active reserve."

Deanna appears in a recurring capacity in the first half of season 3, which includes flashbacks to her motherhood. She is later revealed to have been abducted by the antagonists of the season and is reunited with Riker, who had fallen into an existential crisis after Thad's death and needed to temporarily separate from her to get outside help from Picard. They discuss their marital issues in their detainment, realizing their relationship had turned into one of toxic codependency and longing for adventure. The Enterprise crew reunites with the couple aboard a new incarnation of the USS Titan after Worf rescues them.

Troi appears in the first-season finale of the animated Star Trek: Lower Decks, set a year after the events of Nemesis.

== See also ==
- List of Star Trek: The Next Generation cast members
