= William Riker =

Star Trek character

William T. Riker
- Star Trek: The Next Generation character
- First appearance: "Encounter at Farpoint" (1987) (The Next Generation)
- Created by: Gene Roddenberry; D. C. Fontana
- Portrayed by: Jonathan Frakes
- Voiced by: Jonathan Frakes (in Star Trek: The Next Generation – A Final Unity, Star Trek: Resurgence, Star Trek: Lower Decks)

In-universe information
- Species: Human
- Affiliation: United Federation of Planets; Starfleet
- Fighting style: Anbo-jitsu
- Family: Kyle Riker (father); Betty Riker (mother)
- Spouse: Deanna Troi
- Children: Thaddeus Troi-Riker (dead); Kestra Troi-Riker
- Origin: Alaska, United States, Earth
- Posting: USS Zheng He (PIC); USS Titan (NEM, LDS); USS Enterprise-E; (FCT, INS, NEM); USS Enterprise-D; (Seasons 1–7, GEN); USS Pegasus; USS Potemkin; USS Hood
- Position: Commanding Officer; (USS Enterprise-D, USS Titan, USS Zheng He); First Officer; (USS Enterprise-D, USS Enterprise-E)
- Rank: Captain (NEM, PIC, LDS); Commander (Seasons 1–7, Movies)

William Thomas "Will" Riker is a fictional character in the Star Trek universe appearing primarily as a main character in Star Trek: The Next Generation, portrayed by Jonathan Frakes. Throughout the series and its accompanying films, he is the Enterprise's first officer, and briefly captain, until he accepts command of the USS Titan at the end of Star Trek: Nemesis. He is the husband of Deanna Troi. The adventures of the USS Titan, which Riker captains, are told in the Star Trek: Titan novel series and other Star Trek media.

== Casting ==
Frakes went to seven auditions over six weeks before being cast as Riker. Frakes stated:

I started with the cattle call, then the casting director, the producer, then other directors, to Gene Roddenberry, and then through the Paramount execs, including the vice-president himself and the heads of television.

Michael O'Gorman, Ben Murphy, and Gregg Marx were also considered for the role.

The original casting sheet listed the character as "Number One, a.k.a. William Ryker" and described him as 30 to 35 years old, born in Alaska, agile and strong, and "a natural psychologist". Billy Campbell and Jeffrey Combs were also on the short list. Frakes said the part came down to him and Campbell and that it "was not a unanimous decision"; Roddenberry, who phoned him at home to explain his vision of the character, "had to fight for me", he recalled. Roddenberry told Frakes he wanted Riker to be like Gary Cooper, with "a Midwestern glint, no smiling, all about honor and duty". Frakes found this "a strange, limiting box" for him as an actor and felt he was particularly stiff in the first season.

== Depiction ==
=== Star Trek: The Next Generation ===
Riker is usually referred to as "Will". He is also usually (and informally) called "Number One" by Captain Picard, because of his position as first officer on the Enterprise.

Riker was originally scripted as a much more serious, by-the-book officer, but by the middle episodes of the first season, it was felt that he was too "official", and his character was toned down and became more of a ladies' man. For the first two seasons, Riker is portrayed as a bold, confident and sometimes arrogant, ambitious young officer; however, over time he becomes more reserved, as experience teaches him the wisdom of a patient, careful approach. He becomes comfortable on the Enterprise, repeatedly turning down offers of his own command, and he learns to cherish his fellow officers' company. Nonetheless, he retains a willingness to occasionally disregard the chain of command.

Although Riker was clean-shaven for the first season, he grew a beard at the start of the second season that later became something of a trademark. Between sessions, Frakes grew a beard for his role in the Civil War miniseries North and South, and Gene Roddenberry asked him to keep it because he thought it made Riker look more nautical. Because Frakes' beard coincided with what fans and critics perceived as an improvement of the show's writing quality, "growing the beard" has become an internet colloquialism for a once subpar television series achieving a dramatic level of improvement. Riker did shave his mustache and beard during the events of Star Trek Insurrection, to the amusement of Data.

Riker's background is first explored in the second-season episode "The Icarus Factor". In the episode, Riker's estranged father, Kyle, visits the Enterprise to offer his son the command of the USS Aries, which Riker refuses. We learn that Riker grew up in Alaska; that his mother, Elizabeth (Betty), died when he was two; and that he was raised by his father until age 15, when he left home. In the episode, Riker had not spoken with his father for 15 years, but they manage to partially mend their relationship over a game of martial-arts sparring called Anbo-jitsu. In the episode "Lower Decks", a waiter at Ten Forward mistakenly states that Riker is Canadian, and in the same episode Riker clarifies that he grew up in Alaska. According to the Voyager episode "Death Wish" (in which Riker made a guest appearance), Riker's distant ancestors also lived in the United States: During the American Civil War, his ancestor Colonel Thaddeus Riker fought on the Union side as an officer in the 102nd New York Infantry Regiment during the Atlanta campaign.

In the two-part episode "The Best of Both Worlds" Riker takes command of the Enterprise, promoted to the rank of captain through a field promotion, and orchestrates Picard's rescue. This episode also explores the idea of Riker being unwilling to take chances since he had grown comfortable in his role as First Officer aboard the Enterprise. By the end of the episode, when he orders the Enterprise to fire on former Captain Picard, now Locutus of Borg, Riker has grown into a more confident leader. The sixth-season episode "Second Chances" reveals that Will Riker was duplicated long ago by a transporter malfunction. The "second" Riker takes the name "Thomas", which is revealed to be William Riker's middle name. In the seventh-season episode "The Pegasus", Riker must confront his former commanding officer, Admiral Erik Pressman, over a cover-up related to the destruction of the USS Pegasus. The Pegasus had illegally developed a radically different type of cloaking device that also allowed it to phase through matter, resulting in it becoming fused within an asteroid when unstable power consumption forced the cloaking device offline. In the Enterprise series finale, Riker appears as a never before seen cook discussing matters of life, duty, and sacrifice with the crew. It is revealed that his presence is part of a holodeck simulation of historic events that Riker initiated to help himself make the decision to inform Captain Picard of the illegal research once conducted by Admiral Pressman aboard the Pegasus.

Before the beginning of the series, Riker was involved in a romantic relationship with Counselor Troi on her home planet Betazed. They often refer to each other as imzadi, a Betazoid term of endearment meaning "soulmate". The novel Imzadi takes place before the beginning of the series and explores the history of the relationship between the two characters. The two characters are close friends throughout the series, but their relationship does not resume until Star Trek: Insurrection, the third Star Trek film set in the Next Generation era, although Thomas Riker, the duplicate created by a transporter malfunction, attempts to respark their relationship in "Second Chances". The following movie, Star Trek: Nemesis, begins with their wedding reception on board the Enterprise-E. At the start of the film, Riker finally accepts a promotion to captain and an offer to command the USS Titan; during the movie's final scenes he bids Picard, and the Enterprise, farewell.

=== Star Trek: Voyager ===
Riker guest-starred along with Q in the Star Trek: Voyager episode "Death Wish". He denied that he knew a Q Continuum member named Quinn at a hearing held by the Q Continuum only for Q to show him footage on how Quinn helped his ancestors during the American Civil War.

=== Star Trek: Enterprise ===
Frakes reprised his role of Commander Riker in the 2005 Enterprise series finale, "These Are the Voyages...".

=== Star Trek: Picard ===
Riker returns to the screen in the "Nepenthe" episode of Star Trek: Picard. In that episode, taking place in 2399, Riker is married to Deanna Troi; they have two children, Thad (now deceased) and Kestra. Picard and his gynoid companion Soji visit the Rikers' home, a National Parks-style lodge on the planet Nepenthe, and are welcomed with open arms. Will and Deanna are retired from Starfleet although Will describes his status as being on "active reserve."

Riker makes another Picard appearance in the Season 1 finale "Et in Arcadia Ego, Part II". In that episode, Riker has been reinstated to active duty. He is temporarily in command of the USS Zheng He, the lead ship in a Starfleet squadron sent to the planet Coppelius to protect its inhabitants from imminent Romulan attack.

Riker, along with other former members of the crew of the USS Enterprise-D, return for an extended story arc in the third and final season of Picard, wherein they fight a rogue Changeling conspiracy against the Federation. Riker appears from the season premiere onward (as of the fourth episode), and is acting captain of the USS Titan (NCC-80102-A) – successor to the ship he was given command of at the end of Star Trek: Nemesis, continuing in Star Trek: Lower Decks – in the third and fourth episodes. While conducting a heist at the advanced research center the Daystrom Institute on Picard's behalf, Riker is captured by the rogue Changelings, and reunited with Deanna in the sixth episode. Riker had fallen into an existential crisis after Thad's death, and their relationship had turned into one of toxic codependency and longing for adventure, necessitating their temporary separation and Picard's help. Their former crewmate Worf rescues the couple and brings them aboard the Titan in the eighth episode, reuniting the crew of the Enterprise.

=== Star Trek: Titan novel series ===
In the Star Trek: Titan novel series, Riker captains the USS Titan (NCC-80102) and his crew, including his wife Deanna Troi.

=== Star Trek: Lower Decks ===
Riker appears in "No Small Parts", the 2020 finale of the first season of Star Trek: Lower Decks, as captain of the USS Titan (NCC-80102) alongside his wife Deanna Troi – continuing a posting announced in dialogue at the end of Star Trek: Nemesis (2002). He rescues the USS Cerritos (NCC-75567) from a Pakled attack, and invites ensign Brad Boimler to serve aboard the Titan. Riker returns in the second season's first and second episodes, in which he eventually sends the struggling Boimler back to the Cerritos and replaces him on the Titan with his transporter clone, William Boimler.

== Alternate versions ==
Frakes appeared in dual roles in "Second Chances", a TNG episode where it was established that a duplicate of him was created years earlier by a transporter malfunction. Frakes appeared as the duplicate, Thomas Riker, in the Star Trek: Deep Space Nine episode "Defiant", where Thomas impersonates William in order to commandeer the USS Defiant on behalf of the Maquis.

== Popular culture ==
In 1993, mainframe software company Boole & Babbage announced that it had signed a two-year licensing agreement, paying Paramount Pictures $75,000 a year, to use Star Trek imagery in advertising for its products. Boole & Babbage's campaign used actor Jonathan Frakes, playing his character of Commander William Riker, in their Star Trek-themed advertisements.

== Reception ==
In 2009, IGN rated William Riker the 22nd best character of all Star Trek up to that time.

In 2016, Wired magazine ranked First Officer Riker as the 6th most important character of Starfleet within the Star Trek science fiction universe.

In 2017, IndieWire ranked Riker as the 2nd best character on Star Trek:The Next Generation.

In March 2018, TheWrap placed William Riker as 5th out 39 in a ranking of main cast characters of the Star Trek franchise. In October 2018, CBR ranked Riker as the 12th best Starfleet character of Star Trek.

In 2019, CinemaBlend ranked Riker the fifth best Starfleet character of all time. They point out he is good at his job as "Number One", first officer to Captain Picard on the starship USS Enterprise 1701-D.
