= Beverly Crusher =

Fictional character in Star Trek: The Next Generation

- Star Trek character
- First appearance: "Encounter at Farpoint" (1987)
- Created by: Gene Roddenberry; D. C. Fontana
- Portrayed by: Gates McFadden

In-universe information
- Species: Human
- Affiliation: United Federation of Planets; Starfleet
- Family: Paul Howard (father); Isabel Howard (mother); Felisa Howard (grandmother)
- Spouse: Jack Crusher (deceased)
- Children: Wesley Crusher; Jack Crusher II
- Origin: Copernicus City, Luna
- Posting: USS Enterprise-E (FCT, INS, NEM); USS Enterprise-D (Seasons 1, 3-7, GEN); Starfleet Medical (season 2, Picard finale)
- Position: Chief medical officer (seasons 1 and 3–7, films); Captain (acting) (season 6); Head of Starfleet Medical (season 2, Picard finale)
- Rank: Commander (seasons 1–7, films); Admiral (Picard finale)

Dr. Beverly Crusher (née Howard) is a fictional character in the Star Trek franchise, played by Gates McFadden. Debuting in the television series Star Trek: The Next Generation, McFadden appeared in every season, except for the second, as well as its spin-off feature films: Star Trek Generations, Star Trek: First Contact, Star Trek: Insurrection, and Star Trek: Nemesis. McFadden returned to the role in the third season of Star Trek: Picard. She also had cameo appearances in Star Trek: Prodigy, both as a holographic recreation and the real Crusher.

Crusher was the chief medical officer of the Enterprise-D and Enterprise-E, two starships in the Star Trek universe.

== Casting ==
Gates McFadden was reluctant to accept the role of Dr. Crusher because of her commitment to appear in the play The Matchmaker at the La Jolla Playhouse. Before McFadden was cast, Anne Twomey and Jenny Agutter were considered for the role. During the second season, the character was written out of the series, with the explanation that she "was off heading up Starfleet Medical for the year." Producer Rick Berman has said that McFadden left due to her disputes with the head TNG writer at the time, Maurice Hurley. She was replaced by the louder, more opinionated Dr. Katherine Pulaski (Diana Muldaur). Patrick Stewart was upset by McFadden's departure and played a large part in bringing about her return after Hurley left at the end of the second season.

== Early life ==
Beverly Crusher was born Beverly Howard on October 13, 2324, in Copernicus City, Luna. Her ancestors were Scottish-Americans. Following the death of her parents when she was very young, she lived with her grandmother, Felisa Howard, on Arvada III, a colony planet, until a moon collision caused the planet to flood, forcing its evacuation. Resourceful Felisa, with her granddaughter's aid, used herbs, grasses, tree chemicals, and roots as medicines when synthetic medicines ran out for the injured.

During her youth, Beverly was known as quiet, shy, and socially awkward. She was also very self-conscious about her bright red hair, and at the age of 13, attempted to dye it dark with disastrous results. She admits to Data later, in the episode "Offspring", that she was often ridiculed, unpopular in school, and it had been very painful for her. She also admits that it brought back painful memories of those years when she saw her son Wesley going through similar ridicule as a child.

It was her grandmother's career as a healer and Beverly's own caring, high intelligence, and sensitivity that largely sparked Beverly's lifelong interest in medicine and healing the sick and wounded. The Arvada III disaster solidified Beverly's decision to be a doctor.

After Arvada III was evacuated, Beverly and Felisa then settled on Caldos IV where Beverly lived until she entered Starfleet Academy.

== Starfleet Academy ==
Crusher attended Starfleet Academy from 2342 to 2350 during which she attended medical school. While attending the academy, she became romantically involved with fellow cadet Jack Crusher. They were introduced by their friend, Walker Keel. She graduated top of her class and married Jack in 2348. She had also been called "the Dancing Doctor" when she was at the academy because she had won multiple awards at a dance competition in St. Louis, Missouri. In 2350, she started an internship with Dr. Dalen Quaice.

== Family ==
After marrying Jack, Beverly returned to the Academy while he left for the USS Stargazer. A year later, she gave birth to Wesley Crusher. Jack died on an away mission when their son was five years old. Captain Jean-Luc Picard, who was commanding the Stargazer at the time, took home Jack’s remains. She never fully recovered from his death. Dr. Crusher and Captain Picard were also acquaintances while the character's husband was alive, as Picard and Jack Crusher were very good friends. At the beginning of the series, Picard and Dr. Crusher have not been in contact since Jack's death. "Encounter at Farpoint" is the first time Picard and Crusher's son Wesley truly meet face to face. Later in her life she realizes Picard has fallen in love with her.

As time goes by, both Crusher and Picard try to conceal their feelings from each other. Their relationship advances in "Attached", when the two are linked telepathically and their romantic feelings are revealed. At the end of this episode, Beverly tells Jean-Luc, "Perhaps we should be afraid", implying that she's not ready to take that step forward in their relationship.

However, only a handful of episodes later in "Sub Rosa", it is revealed that neither Beverly nor Jean-Luc has been able to let go of those feelings and they are back to where they started, trying to pretend the feelings don't exist and that they have no problem being "just friends" with one another.

In the series finale "All Good Things...", it is revealed that in an alternate future, Dr. Crusher and Captain Picard had been married and then divorced—still evidently having feelings for each other after so many years. Little information is given about the circumstances of their marriage or separation. In the present the two share a kiss; however, that particular timeline is erased when Picard changes the past.

In the four Next Generation movies, the flirtation between Dr. Crusher and Captain Picard remains, though it is not as obvious as previous episodes and most certainly not part of the substantial movie plots. The most noteworthy moment between the two happens in one of the deleted scenes of the last Next Generation movie, Star Trek: Nemesis.

Following the television series and films, the relationship between Dr. Crusher and Captain Picard continued throughout the non-canonical Star Trek: The Next Generation Pocket Books series. Beverly and Jean-Luc have married, but still serve together on the Enterprise-E. They have a son named René Jacques Robert Francois Picard, named after Picard's older brother (Robert) and nephew (René).

However, in the canonical sequel series Star Trek: Picard, Beverly and Jean-Luc have not married. They have conceived a son, Jack II, but mounting assassination attempts on Picard have led Beverly to hide Jack away from him and raise Jack by herself. By 2401, Beverly is piloting her own charity hospital ship, the SS Eleos, and is assisting her son in his criminal exploits. She sends a message to Jean-Luc requesting help and gets severely injured when encountering an aggressive band of raiders. Picard commandeers a Starfleet ship, the USS Titan, and rescues her and Jack, right before the raiders' leader Vadic destroys the Eleos. After she is treated, Beverly helps the Titan's medical staff throughout the third season, and her analysis of autopsies and interrogation of Vadic with Picard, prove crucial in helping uncover a conspiracy of rogue Changelings infiltrating Starfleet out of revenge for Starfleet's medical experimentation and actions during the Dominion War. She is reunited with the rest of the Enterprise crew as they race to prevent the conspirators and their collaborators the Borg from further attacking Starfleet. When they are too late, Picard decides to infiltrate the Borg's derelict cube and rescue a newly assimilated Jack. Beverly fires the torpedoes that destroy the cube while the rest of the crew beams Picard and Jack out. By 2402, after developing new transporter modifications and gene therapies to prevent the conspirators and their partners the Borg from returning, her commission is reinstated. Beverly is promoted to the rank of Admiral, and Beverly and Picard see their son off as he joins Starfleet aboard the USS Enterprise-G. Beverly and Jean-Luc are last seen playing poker with the rest of the Enterprise-D crew in the Ten Forward bar in Los Angeles, finally content with their lives.

In Star Trek: Prodigy season 2, Kathryn Janeway contacts Beverly in 2384 after meeting Wesley. Beverly isn't able to offer much insight into her son's current activities as Wesley hasn't visited her in years. Beverly laments that "for a time traveler, I wish he had more time to spend with his mother." Wesley later finally visits his mother, and she introduces Wesley to his little brother for the first time, Jack having only been a small child at the time.

== Reception ==
The character has generally been positively received. Zack Handlen of The A.V. Club praised Gates McFadden's performance, as well as the inclusion of a strong, likable female character in the series, but lamented that the character's potential was never fully realized, saying she "should've been one of TNG's best characters" but that "too often, her character has been relegated to back-up roles, interjecting occasional medical jargon to give color to scenes, or else worrying to one side about whether or not Wesley was getting enough fun in his life."

McFadden left the series at the end of the first season and was replaced by Diana Muldaur as Doctor Katherine Pulaski at the beginning of the second. An official announcement stated McFadden had left the series to pursue other career options. McFadden herself got a call from her agent who told her the producers had decided to go in another direction with the character. Like the other cast members, McFadden was surprised. Thanks to a letter-writing campaign, support from Patrick Stewart, and a personal invitation from executive producer Rick Berman, McFadden was brought back to the TNG cast for the third and subsequent seasons, with her only three appearances for season two being stock footage.

In an interview in May 2006, Berman revealed the actress was fired at end of the first season of The Next Generation because head writer Maurice Hurley "had a real bone to pick" and did not like her acting. After Hurley departed the show's writing staff, Berman brought the actress and character back.

In 2016, SyFy ranked Beverly Crusher as the fourth best of the six main-cast space doctors of the Star Trek franchise.

In 2016, Beverly Crusher was ranked as the 20th most important character of Starfleet within the Star Trek science fiction universe by Wired magazine.

In 2017, IndieWire ranked Beverly fifth in a list of important characters on Star Trek: The Next Generation, noting she was "pretty much flawless" and offered "valuable perspectives".

In 2017, IndieWire ranked Crusher as the sixth best character on Star Trek: The Next Generation.

In 2018, CBR ranked Beverly Crusher the 21st best member of Starfleet.

In 2018, The Wrap placed Crusher as 14th out of 39 in a ranking of the franchise's best main characters prior to Star Trek: Discovery.

In 2019, ScreenRant suggested the character was ripe for a spin-off series, highlighting her relations with Picard and also the high potential of the character.

In 2019, SyFy Wire recommended Star Trek: Picard include Beverly Crusher, pointing out her long-time friendship with the titular character. They were critical of the lack of screen time the pair had, lamenting "It was not explored, it was ignored... and Beverly Crusher had almost nothing to do in the TNG films."
