= List of Star Trek characters (N–S) =

This is a list of characters from the Star Trek franchise and the media in which they appear. It lists both major and minor fictional characters including those not originally created for Star Trek but featured in it, alongside real-life persons appearing in a fictional manner, such as holodeck recreations.

== Characters from all series, listed alphabetically ==
=== Key ===
Abbreviation	Title	Date(s)	Medium
TC	"The Cage" (Star Trek: The Original Series)	1966	TV
TOS	Star Trek: The Original Series	1966–1969	TV
TAS	Star Trek: The Animated Series	1973–1974	TV
TMP	Star Trek: The Motion Picture	1979	film
TWOK	Star Trek II: The Wrath of Khan	1982	film
TSFS	Star Trek III: The Search for Spock	1984	film
TVH	Star Trek IV: The Voyage Home	1986	film
TFF	Star Trek V: The Final Frontier	1989	film
TUC	Star Trek VI: The Undiscovered Country	1991	film
TNG	Star Trek: The Next Generation	1987–1994	TV
DS9	Star Trek: Deep Space Nine	1993–1999	TV
GEN	Star Trek Generations	1994	film
VOY	Star Trek: Voyager	1995–2001	TV
FC	Star Trek: First Contact	1996	film
INS	Star Trek: Insurrection	1998	film
NEM	Star Trek: Nemesis	2002	film
ENT	Star Trek: Enterprise	2001–2005	TV
ST09	Star Trek (2009)	2009	film
STID	Star Trek Into Darkness	2013	film
STB	Star Trek Beyond	2016	film
DSC	Star Trek: Discovery	2017–2024	TV
SHO	Star Trek: Short Treks	2018–2020	TV
PIC	Star Trek: Picard	2020–2023	TV
LOW	Star Trek: Lower Decks	2020–2024	TV
PRO	Star Trek: Prodigy	2021–2024	TV
SNW	Star Trek: Strange New Worlds	2022–present	TV
S31	Star Trek: Section 31	2025	film
SFA	Star Trek: Starfleet Academy	2026–present	TV

Bajoran characters are listed by family name, which is stated first.

Joined Trills are listed by the name of the symbiont, which replaces the family name.

=== N ===
Character	Actor	Appearances	Description
Nakahn	Stephen Davies	Darkling (VOY)	Mikhal Traveler and owner of a lodge.
Admiral Nakamura	Clyde Kusatsu	The Measure of a Man, Phantasms, All Good Things... (TNG)	A Starfleet Admiral.
Nanclus	Darryl Henriques	TUC	Romulan ambassador to the Federation in 2293. Involved in the assassination of Klingon Chancellor Gorkon.
Mrs. Narsu		Masks (TNG)	A teacher who supervised Eric Burton's art class.
Alynna Nechayev	Natalija Nogulich	Chain of Command, Part I (TNG) (recurring thereafter); The Maquis, Part II (DS9) (recurring thereafter)	Starfleet Admiral involved in negotiations over the Cardassian Demilitarized Zone. A simulated version of the Admiral was used by the Dominion to test the reaction of Sisko and Starfleet in general to a Dominion attempt to gain a foothold in the Alpha Quadrant.
Neela	Robin Christopher	Duet (DS9), In the Hands of the Prophets (DS9)	Bajoran engineer aboard Deep Space Nine; secretly working for Winn Adami.
Neelix	Ethan Phillips	Caretaker (VOY) (recurring thereafter)	Talaxian ship's cook, morale officer, and chief ambassador of the USS Voyager.
Crewman Nelson	Rachen Assapiomonwait	The Schizoid Man (TNG) (recurring thereafter)	Engineer on the USS Enterprise-D during the 2360s; recurring uncredited background character.
Nero	Eric Bana	ST09	Romulan captain of the 24th-century mining vessel Narada; transported through time on his quest for vengeance for the destruction of his home planet.
Nevala	Valerie Wildman	Message in a Bottle (VOY)	Romulan officer involved in hijacking the USS Prometheus NX-59650, an experimental prototype Federation starship.
Isaac Newton	John Neville; Peter Dennis	Descent, Part 1 (TNG), Death Wish (VOY)	Famous Earth physicist, recreated in the holodeck for a game of poker with Data. Also summoned by "Q" to the USS Voyager to testify at Quinn's asylum hearing.
Nidell	Salli Richardson-Whitfield	Second Sight (DS9)	Halanan wife of terraformer Gideon Seyetik. By "psychoprojective telepathy", she creates an alter ego, Fenna, who fell in love with Benjamin Sisko.
Nilva	Henry Gibson	Profit and Lace (DS9)	Slug-O-Cola tycoon and commissioner of the Ferengi Commerce Authority.
Dr. Noah	Avery Brooks	Our Man Bashir (DS9)	A mad scientist in Bashir's secret agent program. Temporarily altered by a transporter malfunction to look like Benjamin Sisko.
Helen Noel	Marianna Hill	Dagger of the Mind (TOS)	A medical officer on the Enterprise, specializing in psychiatry and penology.
Nog	Aron Eisenberg	Emissary (DS9) (recurring thereafter)	Son of Rom and nephew of Quark; first Ferengi in Starfleet
Noggra	Robert DoQui	Sons of Mogh (DS9)	Old family friend of Worf who takes Kurn into his family.
Heihachiro Nogura	None	TMP (mentioned), books	Starfleet Commanding Admiral and old friend of the Kirk family.
Nomad	Vic Perrin (voice)	The Changeling (TOS)	Hybrid of an Earth space probe and an alien probe. Driven to sterilize imperfection.
Norman	Richard Tatro	I, Mudd (TOS)	An android who infiltrates and hijacks the Enterprise.
Noss	Lori Petty	Gravity (VOY)	Survives on a Class D planet for several years. Falls in love with Tuvok.
N'Vek	Scott MacDonald	Face of the Enemy (TNG)	Romulan subcommander of the IRW Khazara and a member of Ambassador Spock's underground movement on Romulus.

=== O ===
Character	Actor	Appearances	Description
Keiko Ishikawa O'Brien	Rosalind Chao	Data's Day (TNG) (recurring thereafter); A Man Alone (DS9) (recurring thereafter)	Star Fleet botanist; school teacher on Deep Space Nine; wife of Miles O'Brien and mother to Molly and Kirayoshi O'Brien.
Kirayoshi O'Brien	Clara Bravo	The Begotten (DS9) (recurring thereafter)	Son of Keiko and Miles O'Brien; carried to term by Kira Nerys after Keiko is critically injured, in a plotline developed to explain actress Nana Visitor's real-life pregnancy.
Miles Edward O'Brien	Colm Meaney	Encounter at Farpoint (TNG) (recurring thereafter); Emissary (DS9) (recurring thereafter)	Transporter chief on the Enterprise-D, Chief of Operations at DS9, professor of engineering at Starfleet Academy; husband of Keiko O'Brien and father to Molly and Kirayoshi O'Brien.
Molly O'Brien	Hana Hatae, Michelle Krusiec	Disaster (TNG) (recurring thereafter); A Man Alone (DS9) (recurring thereafter)	Daughter of Keiko and Miles O'Brien.
Katie O'Claire	Kate Mulgrew	Fair Haven (VOY)	Alias used by Kathryn Janeway while in Fair Haven.
Odala	Concetta Tomei	Distant Origin (VOY)	Saurian minister.
Odan	Franc Luz	The Host (TNG)	Trill mediator.
Odo	René Auberjonois	Emissary (DS9) (recurring thereafter)	Changeling Security Officer on Deep Space Nine.
Odona	Sharon Acker	The Mark of Gideon (TOS)	Daughter of Ambassador Hodin of the planet Gideon.
Ralph Offenhouse	Peter Mark Richman	The Neutral Zone (TNG)	20th-century human cryogenically frozen and discovered by the Enterprise-D.
Alyssa Ogawa	Patti Yasutake	Future Imperfect (TNG) (recurring thereafter), GEN, FCT	Nurse aboard the Enterprise-D and -E.
Thadiun Okona	William O. Campbell	The Outrageous Okona (TNG), PRO	Alien captain of the small Class 9 interplanetary cargo carrier Erstwhile.
Omet'iklan	Clarence Williams III	To the Death (DS9)	Jem'Hadar "First"; cooperates with Sisko on a mission to deal with renegade Jem'Hadar soldiers.
Onaya	Meg Foster	The Muse (DS9)	Vampiric being who feeds on creative energy. Claims to have helped artists throughout the quadrant, including Earth's William Butler Yeats.
Kai Opaka	Camille Saviola	Emissary (DS9) (recurring thereafter)	Kai (spiritual leader) of Bajor through the latter years of the Cardassian occupation.
Operations Division / Security Officer	Dexter Clay	Encounter at Farpoint (TNG) (recurring thereafter)	Junior-grade Lieutenant on the Enterprise-D.
Orta	Jeffrey Hayenga	Ensign Ro (TNG)	Bajoran terrorist framed by the Cardassians for an attack against a Federation colony.

=== P ===
Character	Actor	Appearances	Description
Palmer	Elizabeth Rogers	The Doomsday Machine (TOS), The Way to Eden (TOS)	Relief communications officer.
Douglas Pabst	René Auberjonois	Far Beyond the Stars (DS9)	Editor of a 1950s-era science fiction magazine in a vision experienced by Benjamin Sisko.
Pardek	Malachi Throne	Unification (TNG)	Romulan senator for the Krocton Segment. Involved in negotiations with Ambassador Spock about Vulcan-Romulan reunification.
Parem	Brian Cousins	The Next Phase (TNG)	Romulan officer who, along with Geordi La Forge and Ro Laren, is rendered invisible and "out of phase" by chroniton particles from an experimental Romulan interphase generator gone amok.
Miral Paris	Lisa LoCicero	Prophecy, Endgame (VOY)	Daughter of Tom Paris and B'Elanna Torres, named after B'Elanna's mother Miral.
Owen Paris	Warren Munson, Richard Herd	Persistence of Vision (VOY) (recurring thereafter)	Father of Tom Paris, captain of the USS Al-Batani, Starfleet Vice Admiral, and instructor at Starfleet Academy. Oversees Project Pathfinder to make contact with Voyager in the Delta Quadrant.
Thomas Eugene Paris	Robert Duncan McNeill	Caretaker (VOY) (recurring thereafter); We'll Always Have Tom Paris (LDX)	Helmsman of the USS Voyager.
Patahk	Steve Rankin	The Enemy (TNG)	Romulan officer and one of two survivors of the crash of the Pi, a small Romulan ship, on the surface of Galorndon Core. Dies on the Enterprise-D after refusing to receive a ribosome donation from a Klingon.
John Frederick Paxton	Peter Weller	Demons (ENT), Terra Prime (ENT)	Leader of the Terra Prime movement.
Melora Pazlar	Daphne Ashbrook	Melora (DS9)	Elaysian Starfleet ensign and cartographer. Adapted for a low-gravity environment, she uses assistive devices in environments with Earth-like gravity.
Pelia	Carol Kane	The Broken Circle (SNW) (recurring thereafter)	Lanthanite engineer. Of an extremely long-lived species who has lived on earth for centuries.
Penk	Jeffrey Combs	Tsunkatse (VOY)	Leader of the fight-to-the-death game "Tsunkatse".
Perrin	Joanna Miles	Sarek (TNG), Unification (TNG)	Widow of Sarek.
Elise Picard	Kim Braden	GEN	Jean-Luc's wife in the Nexus.
Jean-Luc Picard	Patrick Stewart, David Tristan Birkin, Marcus Nash, Dylan Von Halle	Encounter at Farpoint (TNG) (recurring thereafter); Emissary (DS9); GEN; FCT; INS; NEM; Remembrance (PIC) (recurring thereafter)	Captain of the USS Enterprise-D. Also commands, at various times, the USS Stargazer, Enterprise-E, and (as Admiral) the Verity. Retires from Starfleet in 2385, but returns as Chancellor of Starfleet Academy. Son of Maurice and Yvette Picard, and father of Jack Crusher II.
Marie Picard	Samantha Eggar	Family (TNG)	Wife of Robert Picard, mother of René Picard, sister-in-law of Jean-Luc Picard.
Maurice Picard	Clive Church (TNG); James Callis (PIC)	Tapestry (TNG), The Star Gazer (PIC) (recurring thereafter)	Winemaker, father of Jean-Luc Picard.
René Picard	David Tristan Birkin; Christopher James Miller	Family (TNG), GEN	Son of Marie and Robert Picard, nephew of Jean-Luc Picard.
Robert Picard	Jeremy Kemp	Family (TNG)	Husband of Marie Picard, father of René Picard, brother of Jean-Luc Picard.
Yvette Picard	Herta Ware (TNG), Madeline Wise (PIC)	Where No One Has Gone Before (TNG), The Star Gazer (PIC) (recurring thereafter)	Mother of Jean-Luc Picard.
Walter Pierce	Mark Rolston	Eye of the Beholder (TNG)	Starfleet engineer on the Enterprise-D. Part Betazoid, he left empathic traces in the ship's structure on his death in 2363.
Christopher Pike	Jeffrey Hunter, Sean Kenney, Bruce Greenwood, Anson Mount	The Cage (TC), The Menagerie (TOS), Star Trek: Early Voyages, ST09, ID, DSC, Strange New Worlds (SNW) (recurring thereafter)	Captain of the Enterprise NCC-1701 before James T. Kirk.
Mark Piper	Paul Fix	Where No Man Has Gone Before (TOS)	Chief medical officer of the USS Enterprise NCC-1701 in 2265, before Leonard McCoy.
Vedek Porta	Robert Symonds	Accession (DS9)	Bajoran Vedek who kills a member of his group after he refuses to follow his D'Jarra.
Porthos		Broken Bow (ENT) (recurring thereafter)	Captain Archer's dog, a beagle (but a Rottweiler in the Mirror Universe). One of a litter of four male puppies, all named for the Musketeers.
Erik Pressman	Terry O'Quinn	The Pegasus (TNG)	Rear admiral attached to Starfleet Intelligence in 2370. As mission commander of the Enterprise-D's search for the USS Pegasus NCC-53847, he was William Riker's first commanding officer.
Prinadora	None	Doctor Bashir, I Presume? (DS9)	Ferengi former wife of Rom and mother of their son Nog. Due to Rom's love for her, he signed an extension to their marriage contract (without reading the fine print); Prinadora's father was subsequently able to swindle Rom out of all his money, whereupon Prinadora left Rom for a richer man.
Captain Proton	Robert Duncan McNeill	Night (VOY) (recurring thereafter)	Lead character in the holodeck program The Adventures of Captain Proton, played by Tom Paris, Harry Kim, and other crew members.
Katherine Pulaski	Diana Muldaur	The Child (TNG) (recurring thereafter)	Starfleet commander and chief medical officer of the Enterprise-D in 2365.

=== Q ===
Character	Actor	Appearances	Description
Q	John de Lancie	Encounter at Farpoint (TNG) (recurring thereafter); Q-Less (DS9); Death Wish (VOY) (recurring thereafter); The Star Gazer (PIC) (recurring thereafter)	The Q played by de Lancie is the most prominently appearing member of the Q Continuum. He puts Jean-Luc Picard and the crew of the Enterprise on trial, and meddles in their ongoing adventures.
Q	Corbin Bernsen	Deja Q (TNG)	Corbin Bernsen plays a Q who visits from the Q Continuum after John de Lancie's character is expelled and made human as a punishment.
Q	Suzie Plakson	The Q and the Grey (VOY)	Suzie Plakson plays an old friend of John de Lancie's character who fights him in a civil war within the Q continuum. The war is ended when the two of them agree to have a child together.
Q	Harve Presnell	The Q and the Grey (VOY)	Harve Presnell plays a colonel in the civil war against John de Lancie's character.
Q	Keegan de Lancie	Q2 (VOY)	John de Lancie's son Keegan plays his character's son, who was conceived in "The Q and the Grey".
Q or Quinn	Gerrit Graham	Death Wish (VOY)	Gerrit Graham plays a Q who wishes to leave the Continuum and become a human so that he can commit suicide. As a human he takes the name Quinn.
Qatai	W. Morgan Sheppard	Bliss (VOY)	Man who hunts a large, spacefaring bioplasmic life form for at least 40 years.
Dr. Dalen Quaice	Bill Erwin	Remember Me (TNG)	Old colleague of Dr. Beverly Crusher.
Quark	Armin Shimerman	Emissary (DS9) (recurring thereafter)	Ferengi who owns a bar on the Promenade of Deep Space Nine.
Gregory Quinn	Ward Costello	Coming of Age (TNG), Conspiracy (TNG)	Starfleet admiral and friend of Jean-Luc Picard.

=== R ===
Character	Actor	Appearances	Description
Rakal	Marina Sirtis	Face of the Enemy (TNG)	Romulan major and Tal Shiar operative, killed by dissidents in the Romulan Underground.
Sariel Rager	Lanei Chapman	Galaxy's Child, Night Terrors, Relics, Schisms (all TNG)	Conn officer on the Enterprise-D (numerous episodes, on-screen credit for four talking episodes).
Devinoni Ral	Matt McCoy	The Price (TNG)	Human-Betazoid negotiator vying for control of the Barzan Wormhole.
Ramirez	Scott Leva	To the Death (DS9)	Security officer from Defiant. Killed on the Gateway planet by Jem'Hadar.
Ramos	Dennis Madalone	Heart of Glory (TNG)	Human Starfleet security noncommissioned officer on the Enterprise-D in 2364. Shot during Korris's and Konmel's escape from the Security 3 brig.
Ranar	None	The Pegasus (TNG) (mentioned)	Admiral and chief of Starfleet Security in 2370.
Janice Rand	Grace Whitney	The Man Trap (TOS) (recurring thereafter)	Captain Kirk's clerical assistant.
Rudy Ransom	John Savage	Equinox (VOY)	Captain of the Federation starship USS Equinox, stranded in the Delta Quadrant.
Berlinghoff Rasmussen	Matt Frewer	A Matter of Time (TNG)	Con artist and time traveler.
Clare Raymond	Gracie Harrison	The Neutral Zone (TNG)	20th-century human cryogenically frozen and discovered by the Enterprise-D.
Cyrus Redblock	Lawrence Tierney	The Big Goodbye (TNG)	Fictional 1940s crime boss, from Picard's "Dixon Hill" holodeck adventures.
Redjac	None	Wolf in the Fold (TOS)	Non-corporeal alien, drawing sustenance from the emotion of fear, capable of inhabiting corporeal beings and taking control of their bodies.
Malcolm Reed	Dominic Keating	Broken Bow (ENT) (recurring thereafter)	Lieutenant; Tactical and Armory Officer, USS Enterprise NX-01.
Rekar	Judson Scott	Message in a Bottle (VOY)	Romulan commander who hijacks the USS Prometheus NX-59650.
Dexter Remmick	Robert Schenkkan	Coming of Age (TNG), Conspiracy (TNG)	Starfleet lieutenant commander and member of the Inspector General's Office. Investigates the crew of the Enterprise-D.
Retaya	Carlos LaCamara	Improbable Cause (DS9)	Flaxian merchant dealing in fine wares, mostly fabrics and fragrances. Hired by the Tal Shiar to kill Elim Garak.
Paul Rice	Marco Rodriguez	The Arsenal of Freedom (TNG)	Starfleet captain of the light cruiser USS Drake, which disappeared in the Lorenze Cluster; Academy friend of William Riker.
Kyle Riker	Mitchell Ryan	The Icarus Factor (TNG)	Civilian strategist; father of William Riker and Thomas Riker.
Thomas Riker	Jonathan Frakes	Second Chances (TNG), Defiant (DS9)	Transporter twin of William Riker and member of the Maquis resistance.
William Thomas Riker	Jonathan Frakes	Encounter at Farpoint (TNG) (recurring thereafter); Death Wish (VOY); These Are the Voyages... (ENT); GEN; FCT; INS; NEM; Nepenthe (PIC) (recurring thereafter); No Small Parts (LDX) (recurring thereafter)	First officer of the Enterprise-D and Enterprise-E under Captain Picard; Captain of the USS Titan. Husband of Deanna Troi, father of Thaddeus and Kestra Riker. Retires around 2390 but remains on reserve; becomes Acting Captain of the USS Zheng He in 2399, and reactivates his command thereafter.
Kevin Thomas Riley	Bruce Hyde	The Naked Time (TOS), The Conscience of the King (TOS)	Navigator of the starship Enterprise and survivor of Tarsus IV.
Rislan	James Noah	Displaced (VOY)	Nyrian scientist who collaborates with Torres.
Roy Ritterhouse	J. G. Hertzler	Far Beyond the Stars (DS9)	Artist for a 1950s-era science fiction magazine in a vision experienced by Benjamin Sisko.
Riva	Howie Seago	Loud as a Whisper (TNG)	Deaf Federation negotiator; along with his team of interpreters, ferried to a mission by the Enterprise-D.
Rixx	Michael Berryman	Conspiracy (TNG)	Bolian captain of the USS Thomas Paine. He joins fellow captains Walker Keel and Tryla Scott on Dytallix B to warn Picard about the alien conspiracy within Starfleet.
Ro Laren	Michelle Forbes	Ensign Ro (TNG) (recurring thereafter); Imposters (PIC)	Bajoran Starfleet officer released from prison to serve aboard the Enterprise-D; later, Maquis freedom fighter, Federation prisoner, and finally Starfleet Intelligence recruit.
Richard Robau	Faran Tahir	ST09	Captain of the USS Kelvin who relinquishes command to James T. Kirk's father, George Kirk. Killed by Nero (Eric Bana).
Lt. Bronwyn Gail Robinson	Teri Hatcher	The Outrageous Okona (TNG)	Transporter chief on the Enterprise-D.
Rain Robinson	Sarah Silverman	Future's End (VOY)	SETI employee.
Rodek	Tony Todd	Sons of Mogh (DS9)	Son of Noggra.
Amanda Rogers	Olivia d'Abo	True Q (TNG)	Member of the Q Continuum, raised as a human.
Rom	Max Grodénchik	Emissary (DS9) (recurring thereafter)	Ferengi, brother of Quark. Becomes Grand Nagus shortly after Zek's retirement.
Romulan	Darwyn Carson	Improbable Cause (DS9)	Tal Shiar agent.
Romulan Commander	James Doohan	The Survivor (TAS)	Commander of two D7-class battle cruisers; captures the Enterprise.
Romulan Commander	Mark Lenard	Balance of Terror (TOS)	First Romulan seen by Starfleet officers; commander of the Praetor's flagship Bird-of-Prey in destructive attacks against Federation outposts 2, 3, 4 and 8 along the Romulan Neutral Zone in 2266.
Romulan Commander	Joanne Linville	The Enterprise Incident (TOS)	Commander of three Romulan warships which captured the Enterprise in 2269.
Romulan Commander	J. Patrick McCormack	NEM	Present in an Imperial Senate hearing when Praetor Hiren refuses to pursue an alliance with Shinzon of Remus.
Romulan Commander	David Ralphe	NEM	Proposes an alliance between the Romulan military and Shinzon of Remus.
Romulan Commander	Maurice Roëves	The Chase (TNG)	Commander of a Romulan Warbird. Together with Picard and two Cardassians, witnesses an ancient holographic message.
Romulan Commander	Lou Scheimer	The Practical Joker (TAS)	Commander of three D7-class battle cruisers. Ambushes the Enterprise, before encountering a strange energy field in space.
Romulan Commander	Peter Vogt	Tin Man (TNG)	Commander of the second Romulan Warbird sent to make first contact with Tin Man.
Romulan Crewman	Norm Prescott	The Practical Joker (TAS)	Crewman on the Romulan flagship in 2269.
Rondon	Daniel Riordan	Coming of Age (TNG)	Zaldan Starfleet crewman who was assigned to the operations division while based at Relva VII in 2364. Involved in Wesley Crusher's Academy entrance test.
Ronin	Duncan Regehr	Sub Rosa (TNG)	Aniphasic alien, killed by Doctor Crusher.
William J. Ross	Barry Jenner	A Time to Stand (DS9) (recurring thereafter)	Field Commander of Starfleet forces during the Dominion War.
Connaught Rossa	Barbara Townsend	Suddenly Human (TNG)	Starfleet vice admiral and biological grandmother of Jeremiah Rossa.
Jeremiah Rossa	Chad Allen	Suddenly Human (TNG)	See Jono, human born Jeremiah Rossa, adopted by Talarian Captain Endar in accordance with Talarian customs.
Herbert Rossoff	Armin Shimerman	Far Beyond the Stars (DS9)	Writer for a 1950s era science fiction magazine in a vision experienced by Benjamin Sisko.
Michael Rostov	Joseph Will	Vox Sola (ENT) (recurring thereafter)	Engineering crewman on Jonathan Archer's Enterprise (NX-01).
Jackson Roykirk	Marc Daniels	The Changeling (TOS), Watcher (PIC)	21st-century robotics engineer and builder of the space probe Nomad.
Alexander Rozhenko	Jon Paul Steuer, Brian Bonsall, James Sloyan, Marc Worden	Reunion (TNG) (recurring thereafter); Sons and Daughters (DS9) (recurring thereafter)	Son of Worf. Raised at various points by his mother, father, and paternal grandparents. Joins the Klingon military during the Dominion War.
Helena Rozhenko	Georgia Brown	Family (TNG) (recurring thereafter)	Adoptive mother of Worf, mother of Nikolai, wife of Sergey, and guardian of Worf's son Alexander.
Nikolai Rozhenko	Paul Sorvino	Homeward (TNG)	Son of Helena and Sergey, and adoptive brother of Worf.
Sergey Rozhenko	Theodore Bikel	Family (TNG)	Adoptive father of Worf, father of Nikolai, husband of Helena, and guardian of Worf's son Alexander; chief petty officer aboard the USS Intrepid.
Gul Rusot	John Vickery	The Changing Face of Evil, When It Rains..., Tacking into the Wind (DS9)	Cardassian military officer; old friend and second-in-command of Legate Damar.
Benny Russell	Avery Brooks	Far Beyond the Stars, Shadows and Symbols (DS9)	1950s African-American science-fiction writer in a vision experienced by Benjamin Sisko.
Ruwon	Jack Shearer	Visionary (DS9)	Romulan officer on a delegation to Starbase Deep Space Nine to study Starfleet Intelligence reports on the Dominion.
Burt Ryan	Marc Alaimo	Far Beyond the Stars (DS9)	1950s city police officer in a vision experienced by Benjamin Sisko.

=== S ===
Character	Actor	Appearances	Description
Saavik	Kirstie Alley, Robin Curtis	WOK, SFS, TVH	Vulcan-Romulan Starfleet lieutenant junior grade; Spock's protege.
Sakkath	Rocco Sisto	Sarek (TNG)	Assistant to Sarek during the Legaran negotiations.
Salia	Jaime Hubbard	The Dauphin (TNG)	Future ruler of Daled IV, ferried to her planet by the Enterprise-D.
Sarek	Mark Lenard, Jonathan Simpson, Ben Cross, James Frain	Journey to Babel (TOS), Sarek, Redemption (TNG), TMP, SFS, TVH, TFF, TUC, ST09	Vulcan ambassador; father of Spock and Sybok.
Sarjenka	Nikki Cox	Pen Pals (TNG)	Native of a seismically active planet and friend of Data.
Saru	Doug Jones	DSC, "The Brightest Star" (ST)	Kelpien First Officer of the USS Discovery.
Satan's Robot	Tarik Ergin	Night (VOY) (recurring thereafter)	Robot character in The Adventures of Captain Proton holodeck program.
Norah Satie	Jean Simmons	The Drumhead (TNG)	Starfleet admiral and head of a paranoia-fueled investigation aboard the Enterprise-D.
Saunders	Eric Pierpoint	For the Uniform (DS9)	Captain of the starship Malinche assigned to take up the search for renegade Michael Eddington after the Defiant becomes disabled.
Montgomery Scott	James Doohan, Simon Pegg, Martin Quinn	Hegemony (SNW) (recurring thereafter), TOS, TAS, TMP, WOK, SFS, TVH, TFF, TUC, GEN, Relics (TNG), ST09, STID, STB	Chief Engineer of the USS Enterprise and Enterprise-A under Captain Kirk.
Tryla Scott	Ursaline Bryant	Conspiracy (TNG)	Starfleet captain; helps warn Picard of an alien takeover of Starfleet.
Sek	Ronald Robinson	Repression (VOY)	Firstborn son of Tuvok and T'Pel.
Sela	Denise Crosby	The Mind's Eye (TNG), Redemption, Part I and II (TNG), Unification, Part II (TNG)	Romulan commander and hybrid daughter of an alternate timeline version of Tasha Yar. Supervises the "conditioning" of Geordi La Forge aboard her Warbird, provides weapons to the House of Duras in the Klingon Civil War, and coordinates a plan to invade the planet Vulcan.
Dr. Selar	Suzie Plakson	The Schizoid Man (TNG)	Vulcan Starfleet medical officer and lieutenant on the Enterprise-D.
Selok	Sierra Pecheur	Data's Day (TNG)	Romulan subcommander. In her undercover identity as Vulcan ambassador T'Pel, one of the Federation's most honored diplomats.
Septimus	Ian Wolfe	Bread and Circuses (TOS)	Roman citizen and Sun (Son) worshipper on planet 892-IV.
Seska	Martha Hackett	Parallax (VOY) (recurring thereafter)	Cardassian undercover operative; infiltrates the Maquis posing as a Bajoran and is stranded with the rest of the USS Voyager crew in the Delta Quadrant. Later, joins the Kazon-Nistrim and becomes an enemy of the Voyager crew and Captain Kathryn Janeway.
Seven of Nine	Jeri Ryan	Scorpion Part II (VOY) (recurring thereafter); Absolute Candor (PIC) (recurring thereafter)	Former Borg drone, liberated by the USS Voyager and thereafter a member of its crew. Later, member of the Fenris Rangers, then Commander and subsequently Captain of the USS Titan/ "Enterprise- G"
Gideon Seyetik	Richard Kiley	Second Sight (DS9)	Terraformer.
Shakaar Edon	Duncan Regehr	Shakaar (DS9) (recurring thereafter);	Leader of Bajoran resistance during Cardassian occupation; later, First Minister of Bajor.
Shelby	Elizabeth Dennehy	The Best of Both Worlds (TNG), Võx (PIC), Star Trek: New Frontier spin-off novels.	Starfleet Lieutenant Commander assigned to the Enterprise-D to provide assistance against the Borg. Field-promoted to commander and first officer when Picard was assimilated. Becomes fleet admiral before the events of Star Trek: Picard and briefly commands the Enterprise-F before the Borg kill her in 2401.
Jim Shimoda	Benjamin W.S. Lum	The Naked Now (TNG)	Assistant chief engineer on the Enterprise-D in 2364. Under the influence of the polywater intoxication, removes all the isolinear chips from the engine control station.
Shinzon	Tom Hardy	NEM	An imperfect clone of Captain Jean-Luc Picard created by the Romulans with the intent of replacing Picard. This plan is abandoned and Shinzon is exiled to Remus, where he leads soldiers during the Dominion War. Later, he seizes control of the Romulan Senate in a coup d'etat, and lures Picard to the planet with peace overtures.
Thy'lek Shran	Jeffrey Combs	The Andorian Incident (ENT) (recurring thereafter)	Andorian commander of the Andorian Imperial Guard starship Kumari. Assists Jonathan Archer in impeding the Xindi superweapon's deployment against Earth.
Shras	Reggie Nalder	Journey to Babel (TOS)	Andorian ambassador to the 2267 "Babel" conference regarding the admission of Coridan into the Federation.
Jaglom Shrek	James Cromwell	Birthright (TNG)	Yridian with information to sell about Klingons captured by Romulans at Khitomer.
Shresht	None	Novelisations	Insectoid representative on the Xindi Council.
Khan Noonien Singh	Ricardo Montalbán, Benedict Cumberbatch	Space Seed (TOS), WOK, ID	Genetically enhanced superman from the mid-1990s. Attempts to seize control of the Enterprise and is marooned on Ceti Alpha V by James Kirk; 15 years later, takes revenge by hijacking the USS Reliant NCC-1864 and attacking the Enterprise.
Sirol	Michael Mack	The Pegasus (TNG)	Romulan commander of the IRW Terix, assigned to locate and retrieve the USS Pegasus NCC-53847.
Benjamin Lafayette Sisko	Avery Brooks	Emissary (DS9) (recurring thereafter)	Commanding officer of Starbase Deep Space 9 (DS9) and Emissary to the Bajoran Prophets. Promoted from commander to captain after nearly three years at DS9. Father of Jake Sisko and widower of Jennifer Sisko.
Jake Sisko	Cirroc Lofton, Thomas Hobson, Tony Todd	Emissary (DS9) (recurring thereafter)	Son of Benjamin and Jennifer Sisko.
Jennifer Sisko	Felecia M. Bell	Emissary (DS9) (recurring thereafter)	Wife of Benjamin Sisko and mother of Jake Sisko. Killed at Wolf 359, but survived in the mirror universe.
Joseph Sisko	Brock Peters	Homefront (DS9) (recurring thereafter)	New Orleans restaurateur and father of Benjamin Sisko.
Korenna Sisko	Galyn Görg	The Visitor (DS9)	Bajoran wife of Jake Sisko in an alternate future.
Sito Jaxa	Shannon Fill	The First Duty (TNG), Lower Decks (TNG), various novelisations	Bajoran Starfleet officer. While a cadet, implicated (together with Wesley Crusher) in the death of a fellow cadet. As a security ensign aboard the Enterprise-D, killed on a mission to return Cardassian double agent Joret Dal to his home territory.
Jessica Sloan	Jacqueline Schultz	Extreme Measures (DS9)	Wife of Section 31 operative Luther Sloan.
Luther Sloan	William Sadler	Inquisition (DS9) (recurring thereafter)	Section 31 operative who repeatedly attempts to recruit Bashir.
Lily Sloane	Alfre Woodard	FCT, Fissure Quest (LOW)	Twenty-first-century human treated for radiation poisoning on the Enterprise. Assists Zefram Cochrane in building the Phoenix, the first warp-capable ship on Earth. Alternate universe Sloane in LOW, where she assisted Cochrane in building the first quantum reality drive, then commands the Beagle in exploring the multi-verse.
Smith	Andrea Dromm	Where No Man Has Gone Before (TOS)	Command-division yeoman on the Enterprise; close to Gary Mitchell.
Soji Asha	Isa Briones	Remembrance (PIC) (recurring thereafter)	Data's daughter.
Solbor	James Otis	'Til Death Do Us Part, Strange Bedfellows, The Changing Face of Evil (DS9)	Bajoran Ranjen who serves as loyal assistant to Kai Winn until she stabs him in the back, killing him.
Sonak	Jon Rashad Kamal	TMP	Vulcan Starfleet commander assigned to the Enterprise as science officer during the V'Ger crisis. Killed in a transporter accident while beaming up.
Adam Soong	Brent Spiner	Fly Me to the Moon (PIC) (recurring thereafter)	Unethical geneticist whose methods cause his research license to be revoked. While looking for a cure for his daughter Kore's genetic disease, he is approached by Q and later by the Borg Queen, who lure him into helping them and opposing Picard. Ancestor of Noonien Soong.
Altan Inigo Soong	Brent Spiner	Et in Arcadia Ego, The Bounty (PIC)	Son of Noonien Soong, and Data's human "brother". Co-creator of the Asha twins along with Bruce Maddox, and later the developer of the "golem" android. Briefly appears as a hologram in the Daystrom Institute.
Arik Soong	Brent Spiner	Borderland (ENT) (recurring thereafter)	Criminal creator of genetically engineered humans. Ancestor of Noonien Soong.
Juliana Soong	Fionnula Flanagan	Inheritance (TNG)	Deceased wife of Noonien Soong, whose consciousness was transferred at her death to an identical Soong-type android.
Noonien Soong	Brent Spiner	Brothers (TNG) (recurring thereafter)	Human cyberneticist; father of Altan, husband of Juliana, and creator of Data, Lore, a replica of Juliana, B-4, and two other prototype androids. Like Khan Noonien Singh, named for a friend of Gene Roddenberry's.
Tolian Soran	Malcolm McDowell	GEN	El-Aurian scientist desperate to return to the Nexus.
Sovak	Max Grodénchik	Captain's Holiday (TNG)	Ferengi seeking to profit from an archaeological search for the Tox Uthat.
Soval	Gary Graham	Broken Bow (ENT) (recurring thereafter)	Vulcan ambassador to Earth in the 22nd century.
Spock	Leonard Nimoy, Ethan Peck, Zachary Quinto	TOS, TAS, Unification I & II (TNG), DSC, SNW, TMP, WOK, SFS, TVH, TFF, TUC, ST09, STID, STB	Son of Vulcan ambassador Sarek and human Amanda Grayson. Science Officer and First Officer on the USS Enterprise and, subsequently, the USS Enterprise-A; Captain at Starfleet Academy; Federation Ambassador.
Spot		Data's Day (TNG) (recurring thereafter), GEN, NEM	Data's pet cat.
Ssestar	John Durbin	Lonely Among Us (TNG)	Selay delegate to the summit with the Anticans on Parliament.
Henry Starling	Ed Begley, Jr.	Future's End (VOY)	20th-century pothead-turned-entrepreneur after discovering a 29th-century spacecraft that crash-lands near his campsite.
Stel	Larc Spies	The Forge (ENT)	Vulcan chief investigator of the Vulcan Security Directorate in 2154. Carries a bomb into the United Earth Embassy on Vulcan.
Stocker	Charles Drake	The Deadly Years (TOS)	Starfleet commodore and bureaucrat. Convenes an extraordinary competency hearing for Kirk, and subsequently assumes command of the Enterprise.
Stol		Q-Less (DS9)	Cousin of Quark and Rom. Bids 500 bars of gold-pressed latinum for a bejeweled dagger from the Gamma Quadrant during Vash's auction.
Stone	Percy Rodriguez	Court Martial (TOS)	Starfleet commodore and commanding officer of Starbase 11. Convenes a court-martial of Kirk regarding the death of Lieutenant Commander Benjamin Finney.
Stonn	Lawrence Montaigne	Amok Time (TOS)	Vulcan; T'Pring's lover and Spock's rival for her affections.
Dr. Paul Stubbs	Ken Jenkins	Evolution (TNG)	Human astrophysicist. Tries to wipe out a race of nanites to further his own research.
Styles	James Sikking	SFS	Starfleet officer; captain of the USS Excelsior (NX-2000).
Lon Suder	Brad Dourif	Meld, Basics Part 1 & 2 (VOY)	Betazoid Maquis brevet ensign. Helps retake Voyager after its commandeering by the Kazon.
Michael Sullivan	Fintan McKeown	Fair Haven (VOY) (recurring thereafter)	Holographic character in Tom Paris's Fair Haven, owner of a pub in a quaint Irish village. Becomes romantically involved with Captain Janeway, who makes several modifications to his program.
Demora Sulu	Jacqueline Kim, Rihanne Quinn	GEN, STB	Ensign and pilot (helm officer) on the Enterprise-B; daughter of Hikaru Sulu.
Hikaru Sulu	George Takei, John Cho	TOS, TAS, TMP, WOK, SFS, TVH, TFF, TUC, GEN, Flashback (VOY), ST09, STID, STB	Helmsman of the USS Enterprise and Enterprise-A under Captain Kirk; Captain of the USS Excelsior.
Surak	Barry Atwater, Bruce Gray	The Savage Curtain (TOS), Awakening (ENT)	Legendary Vulcan philosopher.
Suran	Jude Ciccolella	NEM	Romulan commander who assures Praetor Shinzon of the fleet's allegiance.
Sutok	Steve Kehela	Fair Trade (VOY)	Drug addict who buys his drugs at the Nekrit Supply Depot.
Sybok	Laurence Luckinbill, Ethan Peck	TFF, The Serene Squall (SNW), Like Chronitons Through the Hourglass (SNW)	Sarek's son by a Vulcan princess; Spock's half-brother. Hijacks the Enterprise-A in attempt to reach God at the center of the galaxy.
Syrran	Michael Nouri	The Forge (ENT)	Vulcan in possession of Surak's katra. Along with his followers, the Syrrannites, seeking the Kir'Shara, an ancient artifact containing Surak's original writings. Introduces himself as "Arev" to Jonathan Archer and T'Pol.

== See also ==
- List of Star Trek characters A–F · G–M · T–Z
- List of recurring Star Trek: Deep Space Nine characters · Discovery · Enterprise · The Next Generation · The Original Series · Voyager
- List of Star Trek episodes
