= Elizabeth Shelby =

Elizabeth Shelby may refer to:

- Elizabeth Shelby, Star Trek character on List of Star Trek characters (N–S)#Shelby
- Elizabeth "Polly" Shelby, character in Peaky Blinders (TV series)
