= Bar Association (Star Trek: Deep Space Nine) =

- Star Trek: Deep Space Nine episode
- Episode no.: Season 4 Episode 16
- Directed by: LeVar Burton
- Story by: Barbara J. Lee; Jenifer A. Lee
- Teleplay by: Robert Hewitt Wolfe; Ira Steven Behr
- Production code: 488
- Original air date: February 19, 1996

Guest appearances
- Max Grodénchik as Rom; Chase Masterson as Leeta; Jeffrey Combs as Liquidator Brunt; Jason Marsden as Grimp; Emilo Borelli as Frool

Episode chronology
← Previous "Sons of Mogh"	Next → "Accession"
- Star Trek: Deep Space Nine season 4

"Bar Association" is the 88th episode of the science fiction television series Star Trek: Deep Space Nine, the sixteenth episode of the fourth season. It was directed by LeVar Burton (who portrayed Chief Engineer Geordi La Forge in Star Trek: The Next Generation).

Set in the 24th century, the series follows the adventures on the space station Deep Space Nine near the planet Bajor. This is one of several episodes focused on the Ferengi, an alien race whose culture is centered around the acquisition of profit, represented in the main cast by the character Quark, a bartender on Deep Space Nine. In this episode, the employees of Quark's bar go on strike in protest of unfair treatment by management (Quark). Leeta, one of the "dabo girls" who operate Quark's gambling machines, makes her third appearance, played by Chase Masterson.

== Plot ==
Quark's brother Rom collapses from an ear infection while working at Quark's. At the infirmary, Dr. Bashir is outraged that Quark refuses to give his employees sick leave and casually suggests that Rom form a union, which is illegal under Ferengi law. When Rom returns to work, Quark announces that he is cutting his employees' salary in response to the lack of Bajoran custom due to a religious abstaining from pleasures. Angered at this mistreatment, Rom calls a secret meeting of Quark's employees and persuades them to start a union. Inspired by Chief O'Brien's tales of his union-leader ancestor Sean O'Brien during the 1902 anthracite coal strike, Rom makes up a list of demands—increased pay, shorter hours, paid sick leave—and when Quark laughs them off, Rom declares that the new union is now on strike.

Rom pays customers to stay out of Quark's, and the station's residents support the strikers and boycott the bar leaving it practically deserted. After Lt. Cdr. Worf, O'Brien, and Bashir wind up in a brawl over a difference of opinion on the issue, Captain Sisko threatens to collect Quark's back rent if the strike doesn't end soon. Quark offers Rom a bribe to stop the strike, but Rom, quoting Marx's Communist Manifesto ("Workers of the world, unite!"), refuses.

Liquidator Brunt, an agent of the Ferengi Commerce Authority, arrives and promises Quark he will put a stop to the strike. Brunt crashes a union meeting and threatens the Ferengi workers with monetary ruin and legal problems if they don't return to Quark's. However, Rom inspires his troops once again, and they rededicate themselves to the strike. Later Quark tries to talk Rom into giving up, worried about what the FCA will do to his brother, but Rom holds firm, questioning Quark's concern for his safety.

Back in the bar, Brunt has his thugs beat up Quark as an example. In the infirmary, Quark offers to secretly honor the demands of the strikers as long as Rom disbands the union and pretends that Quark has won, to which Rom agrees. Once everyone returns to work at their new, higher salaries, Rom makes amends with Quark, but quits his job at the bar to work for the station as a junior repair technician, having realized that he does better outside Quark's authority. He promises to return to the bar frequently—but as a paying customer.

In a subplot, Worf is uncomfortable with the chaos of living on Deep Space Nine and this is exacerbated when his quarters are burgled. Following the brawl with O'Brien and Bashir, he decides to move his quarters to the starship Defiant. Dax gifts him with a collection of Klingon operas, but warns him he'll have to get used to living on the station eventually.

== Reception ==
Michelle Erica Green, reviewing the episode in 2004 for TrekNation, noted some good scenes for Rom, Worf, and O'Brien, but overall did not find either of the main plots interesting, lamenting "I've never been completely sure of the point of having Ferengi on DS9." Tor.com rated it 9 out of 10. Zack Handlen, reviewing the episode in 2013 for The A.V. Club, described it as "fun to watch" despite a lack of tension in the plot.

In 2020, io9 listed this as one of the "must-watch" episodes of the series.
