= Birthright (Star Trek: The Next Generation) =

- Star Trek: The Next Generation episodes
- Episode nos.: Season 6 Episodes 16 and 17
- Directed by: Winrich Kolbe (Part I); Dan Curry (Part II)
- Written by: Brannon Braga (Part I); René Echevarria (Part II)
- Production codes: 242 and 243
- Original air dates: March 7, 1993; March 14, 1993

Guest appearances
- Siddig El Fadil – Julian Bashir; James Cromwell – Jaglom Shrek; Cristine Rose – Gi'ral; Jennifer Gatti – Ba'el; Richard Herd – L'Kor; Sterling Macer Jr. – Toq; Alan Scarfe – Tokath

Episode chronology
← Previous "Tapestry"	Next → "Starship Mine"
- Star Trek: The Next Generation season 6

"Birthright" is a story spanning the 16th and 17th episodes of the sixth season of the American science fiction television series Star Trek: The Next Generation, the 142nd and 143rd episodes overall.

Set in the 24th century, the series follows the adventures of the Starfleet crew of the Federation starship Enterprise-D. In this episode, Worf and Data both seek to know more about their fathers: Worf through visiting a world inside Romulan territory and Data through a newly discovered dream program.

In Part I, the Enterprise visits Deep Space Nine, which was featured in the concurrently airing show set in the same science fiction universe, Star Trek: Deep Space Nine. Several actors and sets from that show are featured in this Star Trek: The Next Generation episode.

== Plot ==
=== Part I ===
While the Enterprise is docked at Deep Space Nine, providing assistance in repairing the Bajoran aqueducts, Worf is approached by an Yridian information broker, Jaglom Shrek (James Cromwell), who claims that Worf's father was not killed at Khitomer, but is instead alive at a Romulan prison camp. Since Mogh's capture would dishonor Worf and his own son, Worf is reluctant to believe the alien's claim but it upsets him. However, following an accident, Data has a dream-like experience that involves his creator and Data approaches Worf to ask about a time Worf himself had a hallucination during a Klingon ritual. Worf realizes that it is important to learn the truth about his father.

Data continues to pursue the meaning behind his dream. Geordi and Dr. Julian Bashir (DS9's Chief Medical Officer) reluctantly recreate the experiment that caused the dream (a dangerous venture that could damage Data permanently). Data has the same experience, which continues on to a conversation between Data and Dr. Noonien Soong, his creator. Soong encourages Data to continue dreaming. Awake, Data comes to the conclusion that Dr. Soong pre-programmed the ability to dream in anticipation of activating it himself. The energy charge from the experiment simply activated this feature. Data then plans to henceforth spend a brief period each day experiencing these dreams.

Worf suspects the information about his father to be a trick and forces the reluctant Yridian to take him to the prison camp himself. Because of the danger involved, Worf makes the final leg of the journey alone on foot, where he finds the Klingons moving about freely with Romulans. He corners one of the Klingons, who informs him that his father fell in battle at Khitomer as he thought, meaning that Worf's family honor is intact. When Worf offers to free the Klingon prisoners, they insist on staying. Since he is aware of the camp's existence and location, they insist that he must also stay. Two armed Romulans show up to prevent Worf from leaving.

=== Part II ===
Worf is puzzled by the Klingons' lack of desire to escape, but the elders explain that it is not a prison in the conventional sense: since returning would be a great dishonor to their families, who have assumed the warriors died in battle, they have chosen to stay. They now live a peaceful life alongside their former Romulan captors and can move freely on the planet. Worf is not allowed to leave, however, to keep the compound's secret. He discovers, to his disgust, that some Romulans and Klingons have even inter-married and had hybrid children.

Worf inspires the young Klingons, who were born in the compound and know nothing of their heritage, to be curious. He teaches them Klingon myths, martial arts, hunting, and other elements of their culture. The head Romulan, Tokath, and the Klingon elders grow increasedly concerned with Worf's influence on the colony's balance. In the meantime Worf develops romantic feelings for Ba'el, a young Klingon woman: initially unaware of her being Tokath's daughter, he's then dismayed by it, but eventually apologizes to her. Tokath explains to Worf that he renounced his military career to run the compound and values this unusual Romulan/Klingon peace, although confined to a remote planet. Worf replies that the young Klingons have a right to their heritage. Eventually Tokath offers Worf a choice: to live among them according to their rules, or to be executed. Worf chooses death, which is honorable for a Klingon, upsetting Ba'el. The next morning, at Worf's execution, the young Klingons he has inspired suddenly decide to stand and die with him, Ba'el included. Unwilling to kill them all, Tokath allows Worf and the young Klingons to leave. A Romulan warbird delivers them to the Enterprise, which had been searching for Worf since his disappearance from DS9. Captain Picard then asks Worf if his father was being held in the prison camp, to which Worf replies that his father fell in battle as he had thought, that no one survived Khitomer, and there was no prison camp; the young Klingons were survivors of a shuttle crash four years prior. Captain Picard nods and says “I understand,” hinting that he suspects that the camp does exist, but is willing not to pursue finding it.

== Production ==
"Birthright, Part I" is a crossover episode featuring some of the characters from Star Trek: Deep Space Nine as well as the first time where the DS9 uniform appears on Star Trek: The Next Generation (the TNG crew would later wear those uniforms for Star Trek Generations alongside the TNG uniforms) and the first time where the Deep Space Nine space station appears outside of Star Trek: Deep Space Nine, which would not occur again until "Caretaker", the premiere episode of Star Trek: Voyager.

The A-plot in this story derived from two separate premises. One, pitched by George Brozak, concerned captured Klingons too proud to go home. The other, from Daryl F. Mallett, Arthur Loy Holcomb, and Barbra Wallace, concerned the news that Worf's father Mogh might still be alive after Khitomer.

The B-plot involving Data's dreams is only featured in "Part I" to fill that episode, with no follow-up in "Part II", after it was decided to end "Part I" with Worf's capture.

Guest star Richard Herd had previously appeared in other science fiction television series such as in the main cast of the original miniseries of V and a guest appearance on Quantum Leap. "Birthright" marked his first appearance in the Star Trek franchise, where he played the Klingon L'Kor, the leader of the group that had been captured by the Romulans. Initially the character was intended to be revealed as Worf's father, Mogh, Herd explained: "In the original script, I was Worf's father. That was their initial thought, but then [the producers] decided that it would be too complicated." The role required him to undergo three hours of makeup each day, but he said: "I had such a good time that I would love to do another Star Trek". He would go on to be cast in a recurring role on Star Trek: Voyager as Admiral Owen Paris, the father of Tom Paris.

"Birthright, Part II" was the only episode directed by visual effects supervisor Dan Curry. Curry was the Visual Effects supervisor for the series and normally served as the second unit director.

The matte painting of the Khitomer massacre survivors outpost was later reused as the Bajoran village in the Star Trek: Deep Space Nine episode "Storyteller".

Brent Spiner plays two roles in this episode – that of Data as well as Data's creator, Dr. Noonien Soong.

== Reception ==
In 2011, The A.V. Club rated both Part I of Birthright as a "B+" and Part II with a "B", while noting the theme of fathers. They felt the first half was stronger than the second, but that the episodes are quite distinct. They elaborate that they felt the first part had a good setup which raised a lot of questions, but they felt that this build-up was not really resolved in the second part in a satisfying way, and many questions raised in the first part were not answered at all in the sequel.

In 2019, a listicle published on Screen Rant ranked a character introduced in this episode, Ba'el, as the fifth most important Romulan of the Star Trek franchise, also noting her Romulan and Klingon alien heritage. This episode is noted for depicting a Romulan prison camp, which connects to other plot elements in Worf's character story and the episode. However, the author of another listicle on Screen Rant felt that the romance between Worf and Ba'el was one of the negative one-off romances on the show, in particular they were critical of Worf "being a jerk" about Ba'el’s heritage.

"Birthright" was also recommended by yet another listicle on Screen Rant as background on the character Data, for the series Star Trek: Picard. The author points out how "Birthright" examines Data's dream program.

== Releases ==
The episode was released as part of the Star Trek: The Next Generation season six DVD box set in the United States on December 3, 2002. A remastered HD version was released on Blu-ray optical disc, on June 24, 2014.
