= New Ground (Star Trek: The Next Generation) =

- Star Trek: The Next Generation episode
- Episode no.: Season 5 Episode 10
- Directed by: Robert Scheerer
- Story by: Sara Charno; Stuart Charno
- Teleplay by: Grant Rosenberg
- Production code: 210
- Original air date: December 30, 1991

Guest appearances
- Brian Bonsall - Alexander Rozhenko; Georgia Brown - Helena Rozhenko; Richard McGonagle - Ja'Dar; Jennifer Edwards - Miss Kyle; Sheila Franklin - Felton

Episode chronology
← Previous "A Matter of Time"	Next → "Hero Worship"
- Star Trek: The Next Generation season 5

"New Ground" is the tenth episode of the fifth season of the American science fiction television series Star Trek: The Next Generation.

Set in the 24th century, the series follows the adventures of the Starfleet crew of the Federation starship Enterprise-D. In this episode, Worf is less than thrilled when his foster mother, Helena, arrives with his son Alexander. Although Helena and Worf's foster father, Sergey, had agreed to raise the boy after K'Ehleyr's death, Helena now reports that Alexander is having a difficult time adjusting to his new life, and they're not as young as they used to be; he needs to be raised by his father on the Enterprise. Predictably, Worf and Alexander have a difficult time as well adjusting to one another, a situation aggravated by a ship-based experiment that becomes life-threatening. Georgia Brown, who played Worf's foster mother, died just 5½ months after the episode aired.

== Plot ==
The Enterprise is scheduled to assist with a trial run of soliton wave technology, which has the potential to allow vessels to travel at warp speed even if they are not equipped with warp drive engines. Worf receives a message from Helena Rozhenko, his human foster mother, who requests to visit and bring his son Alexander. He is surprised to learn that Helena intends to leave Alexander with him on the Enterprise; she and her husband Sergey are having too much trouble caring for the boy in their old age, and she feels that he needs to be raised by his father.

Soon after Alexander is enrolled in the ship's school, his teacher voices concerns to Worf about his behavior, such as lying, bullying other students, and taking their toys. Tensions between father and son rise after Alexander refuses to admit stealing a model during a class field trip and Worf finds it in his pocket. Worf decides to send Alexander away to a Klingon school, but Counselor Troi persuades him to reconsider, pointing out that Alexander may be acting on feelings of abandonment since his mother is dead and he has been in the care of the Rozhenkos instead of his father.

A distortion during the soliton wave experiment damages the Enterprise and destroys the test ship. The wave is on a collision course with a colony on Lemma II, and is growing in power and speed so quickly that its impact will destroy most of the planet. La Forge recommends that the Enterprise pull ahead of the wave and fire photon torpedoes to dissipate it. Unfortunately the wave is now so large that there is no time to take the Enterprise around it, forced them to go through it. The ship survives the hazardous trip, but a fire breaks out in a laboratory where Alexander has sneaked in which will be flooded with radiation from the torpedoes. Worf and Riker find him pinned under debris, and when Alexander tells his father he's scared Worf summons the strength to move the beam that he and Riker originally couldn't lift. They all get out just in time for the Enterprise to fire the torpedoes and prevent the colony from being destroyed.

Dr. Crusher diagnoses Alexander with smoke inhalation and a broken leg and assures Worf he will be fully recovered after an overnight stay in Sickbay. Worf softens his attitude toward Alexander and invites him to stay on the Enterprise, saying that it will be an even greater challenge for both of them than the Klingon school. Alexander accepts the offer as a way of honoring his mother's memory.

== Releases ==
The episode was released in the United States on November 5, 2002, as part of the season five DVD box set. The first Blu-ray release was in the United States on November 18, 2013, followed by the United Kingdom the next day, November 19, 2013.
