= Accession (Star Trek: Deep Space Nine) =

- Star Trek: Deep Space Nine episode
- Episode no.: Season 4 Episode 17
- Directed by: Les Landau
- Written by: Jane Espenson
- Cinematography by: Jonathan West
- Production code: 489
- Original air date: February 26, 1996

Guest appearances
- Richard Libertini as Akorem Laan; Rosalind Chao as Keiko O'Brien; Hana Hatae as Molly O'Brien; Camille Saviola as Kai Opaka; Robert Symonds as Vedek Porta; David Carpenter as Onara; Grace Zandarski as Latara; Laura Jane Salvato as Gia

Episode chronology
| ← Previous "Bar Association" | Next → "Rules of Engagement" |
- Star Trek: Deep Space Nine season 4

"Accession" is the 89th episode of the syndicated American science fiction television series Star Trek: Deep Space Nine, the 17th episode of the fourth season.

Set in the 24th century, the series follows the adventures on Deep Space Nine, a space station located near a stable wormhole between the Alpha and Gamma quadrants of the Milky Way Galaxy. The wormhole is the home of powerful non-corporeal beings, known as the "Prophets", who are worshiped by the natives of the nearby planet Bajor as gods; the Bajorans consider Benjamin Sisko (Avery Brooks), the human commanding officer of the space station, to be the Prophets' chosen "Emissary". In this episode, Sisko is given a much-appreciated opportunity to relinquish the title of Emissary, but soon comes to regret it.

A subplot in this episode involves Keiko O'Brien's return to the station after a research expedition to Bajor and her husband Miles re-adapting to life with her after her extended absence.

== Plot ==
An archaic Bajoran spaceship emerges from the wormhole. Its passenger, Akorem Laan, is a revered Bajoran poet who disappeared 200 years ago. Akorem claims to have been chosen by the Prophets as their Emissary—a role thought to belong to Captain Sisko. Sisko, who never felt comfortable being the Bajorans' messiah figure, immediately cedes the title.

Akorem believes the Prophets brought him back to restore Bajor's traditional caste system, abandoned during the 50-year Cardassian occupation of Bajor. Porta, a Bajoran priest who supports Akorem, tells Major Kira that she must resign her military commission and become an artist, which is the traditional profession of her caste. Sisko warns that caste-based discrimination would disqualify Bajor from membership in the United Federation of Planets, but Akorem is adamant. He later discusses this with Kira, who has misgivings but is willing to follow Akorem's will. She tells Sisko how devoted the Bajorans are to the Emissary and they would have done anything Sisko had asked when he held the title.

Sisko has a dream where Kai Opaka, a former spiritual leader of Bajor, tells him that he has lost sight of who he is. Doctor Bashir believes that Sisko has experienced an "orb shadow", a type of hallucination that Bajorans believe are reminders to people who ignore the Prophets' will. Sisko accepts treatment to make the visions stop. Things go from bad to worse for Sisko; Starfleet is very unhappy with him for allowing Bajor's application for Federation membership to collapse, while Kira tells him she intends to resign her commission, as her caste dicates that she must become an artist.

Porta murders a fellow priest whose caste is considered spiritually unclean. Sisko decides enough is enough and challenges Akorem for the role of Emissary. Knowing the chaos that will be caused if they ask the Bajorans to choose between them, they go to the wormhole and ask the Prophets themselves what they want. The Prophets tell them that Sisko is in fact their Emissary and that they brought Akorem to the present to remind Sisko of the responsibility he bears. Akorem is sent back to his own era with no memory of what happened to him in the future. Sisko still has questions for the Prophets, but they simply tell him that they are of Bajor, as is he.

Once again recognized as the Emissary by the Bajorans, Sisko accepts the role happily, newly appreciating the positive influence he has on the Bajoran people. Major Kira notices that Akorem's epic poem The Call of the Prophets—which had, up to that point, been incomplete—now exists in its entirety, suggesting that Akorem was able to complete his masterwork after returning to the past.

In a side plot, Keiko O'Brien and her daughter Molly return from a research trip to Bajor. Keiko is pregnant with her and Miles' second child. While Miles is glad to have his family back on the station, he misses the free time he had to spend with Bashir. Keiko notices this and arranges for the two to keep spending time together.

== Production ==
Akorem's spacecraft is represented by computer-generated imagery produced by Industrial Light & Magic. They also did a similar spacecraft in the episode "Explorers".

== Reception ==
In 2018, SyFy recommended this episode for its abbreviated watch guide for the character Kira Nerys. They praised this episode for not only having a "beautiful scene" but also establishing how much Kira values her job on the space station, and her relationships there.

In 2020, Io9 said this was one of the "must watch" episodes from the series.

== See also ==
- "Disaster" - the fifth season episode of Star Trek: The Next Generation where, as mentioned, Lt. Commander Worf is forced to deliver the O'Briens' first baby, Molly, in the Enterprise's Ten-Forward lounge.
