= John Vickery (actor) =

American actor

- Born: Alameda, California, U.S.
- Occupation: Actor
- Years active: 1980–present
- Children: 2

John Vickery (born 4th of november, 1950) is an American stage and film actor. He is known for his work in Babylon 5 and Star Trek.

== Life and career ==
In Babylon 5, he played both Neroon and Mr. Welles. Vickery would also make a guest appearance as the latter in the Babylon 5 spin-off, Crusade. His largest Star Trek role was as Rusot, a member of Damar's Cardassian resistance group, appearing in the Star Trek: Deep Space Nine episodes "The Changing Face of Evil", "When It Rains…" and "Tacking into the Wind". He also played a Betazoid in the Star Trek: The Next Generation episode "Night Terrors" and a Klingon in the Star Trek: Enterprise episode "Judgment". He portrayed the Auctioneer in the Pirates of the Caribbean short film Tales of the Code: Wedlocked. He appeared as Petyr in the Frasier episode "Roe to Perdition", playing a Russian back-street caviar dealer who provides them with quality merchandise at an attractive price.

Vickery also originated the role of Scar in The Lion King. Before performing, he would often read of a Robert Graves poem, most famously Fairies and Fusiliers. His other Broadway credits include The Sisters Rosensweig, The Real Thing, and Eminent Domain. He performs frequently at regional theaters including South Coast Repertory, Mark Taper Forum, Old Globe Theatre, McCarter Theatre, and Long Wharf Theatre.

His film work includes Jürgen Vsych's short film Son for Sail.

He voiced the character Legolas in the 1979 radio adaptation of The Lord of the Rings. He was also the voice of Kenshiro in the 1986 film, Fist of the North Star and Teknoman Dagger in Tekkaman Blade. In the video game version of Dante's Inferno, Vickery plays the voice of Lucifer, the main antagonist.

== Stage Credits ==
Year	Show	Role	Notes
1981	Macbeth	Malcolm	Original, Vivian Beaumont Theater
1981	Ned & Jack	Edward Sheldon	Original, Little Theater
1982	Eminent Domain	Victor Salt	Original, Circle in the Square Theatre
1984	The Real Thing	Henry	Replacement, Plymouth Theater
1993	The Sisters Rosensweig	Geoffery Duncan	Original, Ethel Barrymore Theatre
1997	The Lion King	Scar	Original, New Amsterdam Theatre
