= Tapestry (Star Trek: The Next Generation) =

- Star Trek: The Next Generation episode
- Episode no.: Season 6 Episode 15
- Directed by: Les Landau
- Written by: Ronald D. Moore
- Production code: 241
- Original air date: February 15, 1993
- Running time: 45 minutes

Guest appearances
- John de Lancie - Q; Ned Vaughn - Cortin Zweller; J. C. Brandy - Marta Batanides; Clint Carmichael - Nausicaan; Rae Norman - Penny Muroc; Clive Church - Maurice Picard; Marcus Nash - Young Picard; Majel Barrett - Computer Voice

Episode chronology
← Previous "Face of the Enemy"	Next → "Birthright"
- Star Trek: The Next Generation season 6

"Tapestry" is the 15th episode of the sixth season of the American science fiction television series Star Trek: The Next Generation, the 141st overall. It was originally released on February 15, 1993, in broadcast syndication. Ronald D. Moore was credited with writing the episode, but the basis of the story was a collaborative effort from the writing crew. "Tapestry" was directed by Les Landau, with the title coming from executive producer Michael Piller.

Set in the 24th century, the series follows the adventures of the Starfleet crew of the Federation starship Enterprise-D. In this episode, Q (John de Lancie) allows a supposedly deceased Captain Jean-Luc Picard (Patrick Stewart) to re-visit a pivotal event in his youth that he since regrets. Picard changes the past, but upon returning to the present he finds that the event made him the man he became. He returns once more to the past and returns it to the way it originally took place. Picard wakes up in the present, unsure if the events took place or if they were a dream caused by his injury.

== Plot ==
During a diplomatic mission, Captain Picard is gravely wounded and transported directly to sickbay. As Dr. Crusher works frantically to revive him, Picard awakens to find himself in an otherworldly realm where he is greeted by the god-like alien Q. Q bluntly tells Picard that he is dead, explaining that a terrorist's weapon destroyed his artificial heart. Picard lost his natural heart as a young officer when he was stabbed during a bar brawl, an event he regrets. When Picard reflects that he would do things differently if he could relive that moment, Q sends him back in time to the day before the bar brawl, where he meets with fellow cadets Corey Zweller and Marta Batanides. They remark on his sudden personality change – no more devil-may-care attitude.

After being cheated by a Nausicaan in a bar game, Zweller plans revenge by rigging the next match. Picard talks him out of it, but the Nausicaans try to goad them into another game, which Picard prevents. When Zweller is provoked into attacking the Nausicaans, Picard holds him back, averting tragedy but humiliating his friend. The Nausicaans walk away laughing, and Zweller and Batanides leave in disgust.

Q returns Picard to the Enterprise in the present. To Picard's surprise, he is not the captain but rather a junior science officer who has led an unremarkable career. He consults Commander Riker and Counselor Troi, who explain that his aversion to risk means he has never distinguished himself.

Picard confronts Q, who tells him that although the fight with the Nausicaan was nearly fatal, it also gave him a sense of mortality and taught him that life was too precious to squander by playing it safe. Picard realizes that attempting to suppress and ignore his past indiscretions has resulted in losing a part of himself. He declares that he would rather die as captain of the Enterprise than live as a nobody. Q sends him back to the bar fight and events unfold as they did originally, with Picard stabbed through the heart and laughing as he collapses to the floor.

Picard awakens in sickbay, captain of the Enterprise again. As he recovers, he wonders whether his journey into the past was one of Q's illusions or merely a dream. Regardless, he is grateful for the insight the experience gave him.

== Production ==
=== Writing ===
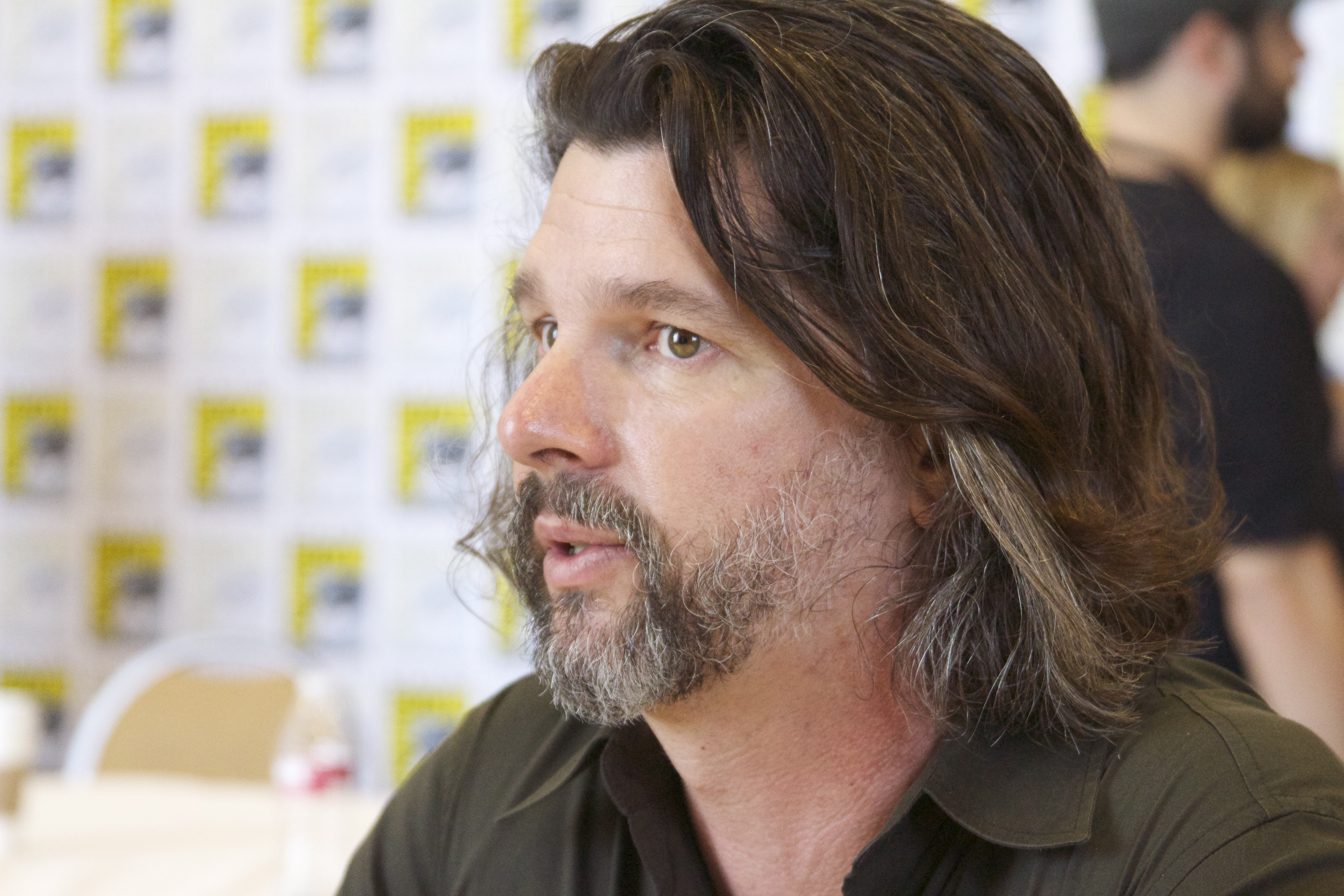
Writer Ronald D. Moore initially sought to base the premise of the episode on A Christmas Carol.

This was the first time that Ronald D. Moore wrote a Q-based episode, and he was excited by the idea of giving Picard a near-death experience and Q appearing to the Captain as if he were God. His plan for "Tapestry" was to follow a similar path to Charles Dickens' 1843 novella A Christmas Carol, but with Q playing a similar role to the three ghosts in Dickens' story. Moore envisaged three stages to the story, one where Picard is attacked and needs an artificial heart, another with Picard as a child and a third based on the USS Stargazer. He pitched the idea to executive producer Michael Piller, who wasn't enthusiastic about the premise. The combination of that disapproval and the expected cost of filming because of the additional sets required meant that the episode had to be trimmed.

Moore discussed the idea with other members of the writing staff; they focused on the incident which caused Picard to require an artificial heart. It had previously been mentioned in the episodes "Samaritan Snare" and "Final Mission". They compared Picard to Captain James T. Kirk, describing them as opposites in terms of development. They saw Picard being a wild child during his time at Starfleet Academy, only to become more serious later. The reverse was true for Kirk, with the staff describing him as a "bookworm" while at the Academy and only becoming "crazy" once posted to a starship. Together, they sought for a way to support Picard's claim in "Samaritan Snare" that he laughed when he was stabbed. Story editor René Echevarria said: "It made us all think we had really come up with the right story for the premise and tying that together, I think it's one of the finest efforts ever." Moore also said that it was in some ways his own personal story, in that what he thought were big mistakes were what allowed him to end up working on Star Trek. While Moore called the episode "A Q Carol" based on the original premise, Piller was the one to suggest "Tapestry" as he said "you have to learn to set your part of the tapestry of your life".

The writers could not remember the source of the "white room" idea, and it was only after the episode aired that James Mooring contacted the staff. He had submitted a spec script featuring a similar idea. Producer Jeri Taylor admitted that the similarity was unintentional, and after both she and Moore spoke to Mooring, the matter was settled. Mooring was paid, and his contribution to the episode was acknowledged by the staff. There were several changes made to the script prior to filming, including the removal of Edward Jellico as the Captain of the Enterprise in Picard's alternative future and clarification that the stabbing of Picard was not the major event in his life which Boothby described in "The First Duty".

=== Casting and filming ===
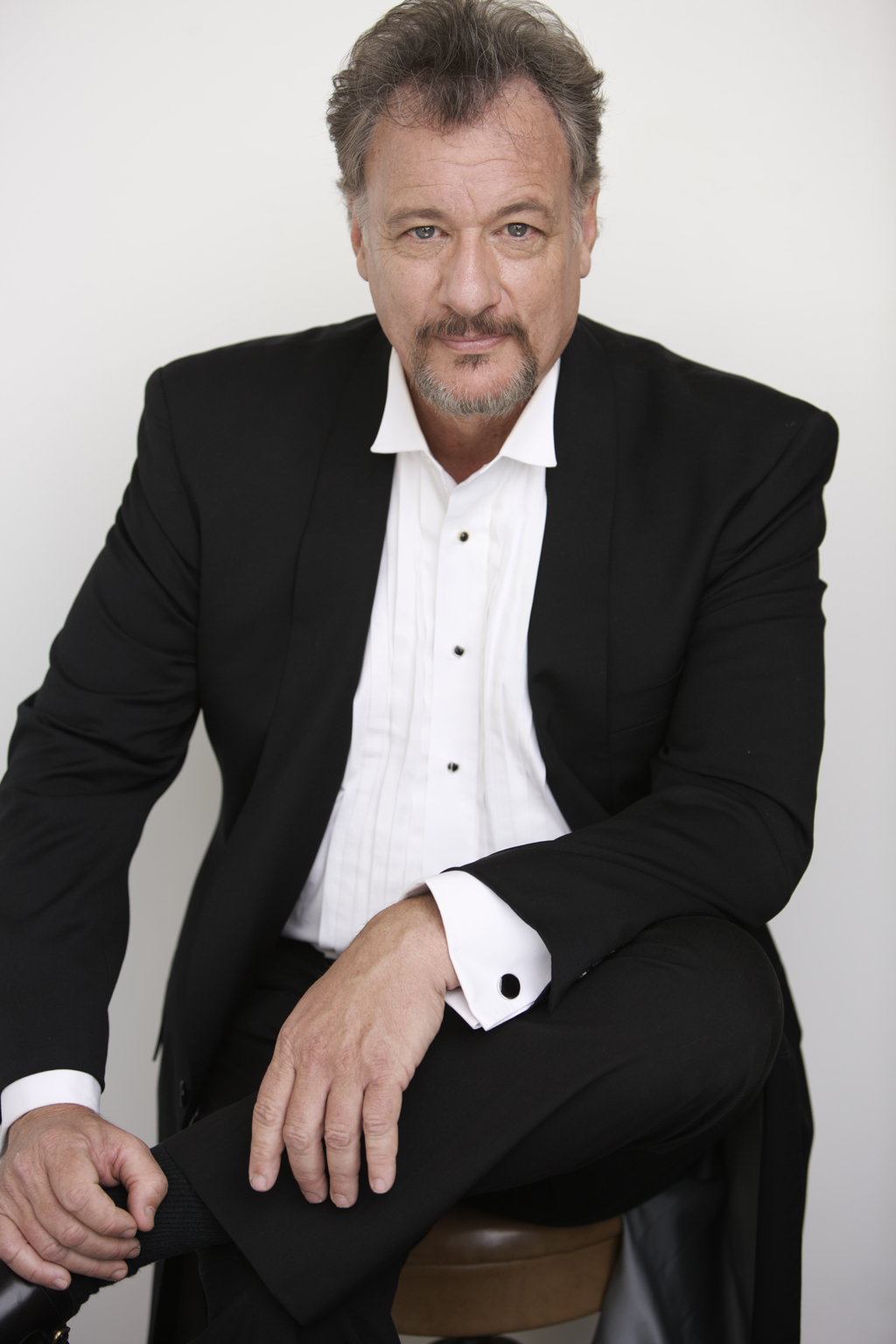
John de Lancie made his seventh appearance as Q during the series in "Tapestry".

John de Lancie returned to the series in "Tapestry" as Q, having appeared on a recurring basis since his first appearance in the pilot, "Encounter at Farpoint". He had already appeared twice during the 1992/93 television season as the character, both earlier in the TNG season in "True Q" as well as the Star Trek: Deep Space Nine episode "Q-Less". De Lancie thought that the script for "Tapestry" was "terrific", and praised the speech he got to perform at the end of the episode.

Appearing for the first time in Star Trek was J. C. Brandy as Marta Batanides. She was 17 years old. She was nervous and intimidated to work with Patrick Stewart, but said that everyone on the cast and crew made her feel welcome. There were concerns when she first arrived on set for costume fitting as she looked quite young, and Stewart was worried about the age difference on screen. Director Les Landau requested that the hair and make-up on Brandy should make her look older. Brandy said that this "worked nicely", but they still "downplayed the sex". She was pleased with her scenes with Stewart, as they managed to capture a "nervousness and innocence" in Picard and Batanides's relationship. The episode marked the first appearance of the Nausicaans on screen with Clint Carmichael playing the lead alien, although they had been mentioned earlier in the episode "Samaritan Snare". The two non-speaking members of the race were portrayed by stuntmen Tom Morga and Nick Dimitri. The two appeared on screen without make-up in the episodes "A Fistful of Datas" and "Emergence," respectively.

A significant number of previously created costumes and make-up were included in the barroom scenes in "Tapestry". There were notes from the producers not to include any Ferengi, as at that point the Federation had not yet made first contact with them. The scene featured both Anticans and Selay close to one another, despite being at war at the time that this flashback scene was set and only making peace earlier in The Next Generation in the episode "Lonely Among Us". Several of the glasses and other props in this scene were from a collection that Paramount had stored from the 1956 Charlton Heston film, The Ten Commandments. There were problems with the audio recordings of some scenes with Stewart and Brandy, as the camera dolly was noisy which required them to re-record their lines later so that they could be dubbed over the originals. Brandy was "amazed" that there was no difference she could tell in Stewart's performance, but felt that it took away an element from her performance.

The scenes with Q and Picard together on a white background were compared to those in the Warren Beatty and Buck Henry 1978 film Heaven Can Wait by producer Merri Howard and director of photography Jonathan West. These particular scenes caused some problems as there were concerns by the director of photography that Q's white robes would not show up on camera well against the all-white background. They were worried that he might appear simply as a floating head. With both de Lancie and Stewart anticipating re-shoots for these scenes, they were both unhappy as they shot those appearances. However, this was filmed late on the last day; de Lancie said that it resulted in both of them looking quite tired. Some scenes were cut in order to reduce the episode down to the required length. This included a one-page monologue by Batanides which would have taken place the morning after her liaison with Picard, a scene where Picard was to report to La Forge in engineering, audio mention of Dr. Selar and a mention of Scobee Hall – a reference to Dick Scobee, the commander of the Space Shuttle Challenger at the time of the destruction of the vessel.

== Themes ==
Michele and Duncan Barrett describe in their 2001 book Star Trek: The Human Frontier that "Tapestry" has "complex implications", as it demonstrates who a person is by the experiences they have had throughout their life as well as who that person truly is. They also wrote that Picard was not required to pay a price for his resurrection at the hands of Q due to "popular narrative being what it is". In Atara Stein's The Byronic Hero in Film, Fiction, and Television, the author describes "Tapestry" as showing a change in Q from his usual satanic stance and instead taking on the role of Picard's guardian angel. Stein also references the alien's increasing influence on the personal lives of the Enterprise crew, a path which Q began in the episode "Hide and Q".

== Reception ==
=== Ratings ===
"Tapestry" was originally released in broadcast syndication on February 15, 1993. It received Nielsen ratings of 13.8 percent, placing it in third place in its timeslot. This was the joint second highest rating received by an episode during the sixth season, alongside the second part of "Time's Arrow". The only episode which had higher Nielsen ratings during that season was "Aquiel", which aired two weeks prior to "Tapestry".

=== Crew and fan reception ===
While the majority of the staff were pleased with "Tapestry", Piller felt that the premise was tired and was concerned that it was simply a take on the 1946 film It's a Wonderful Life. He said that some scenes were "very talky", and the direction and some performances were "flat". Moore described "Tapestry" as "one of the best things I wrote and one of TNG's finest episodes". Some fans wrote in to the staff to complain that the episode glorified violence, and was against the principles of Star Trek. Jeri Taylor admitted that the episode could be seen as violent, but it never crossed the mind of any of the staff during production. She went on to say that if they had realized that "Tapestry" could be considered to promote violence, then they would have corrected it to ensure that it wouldn't be viewed as such.

=== Critical reception ===
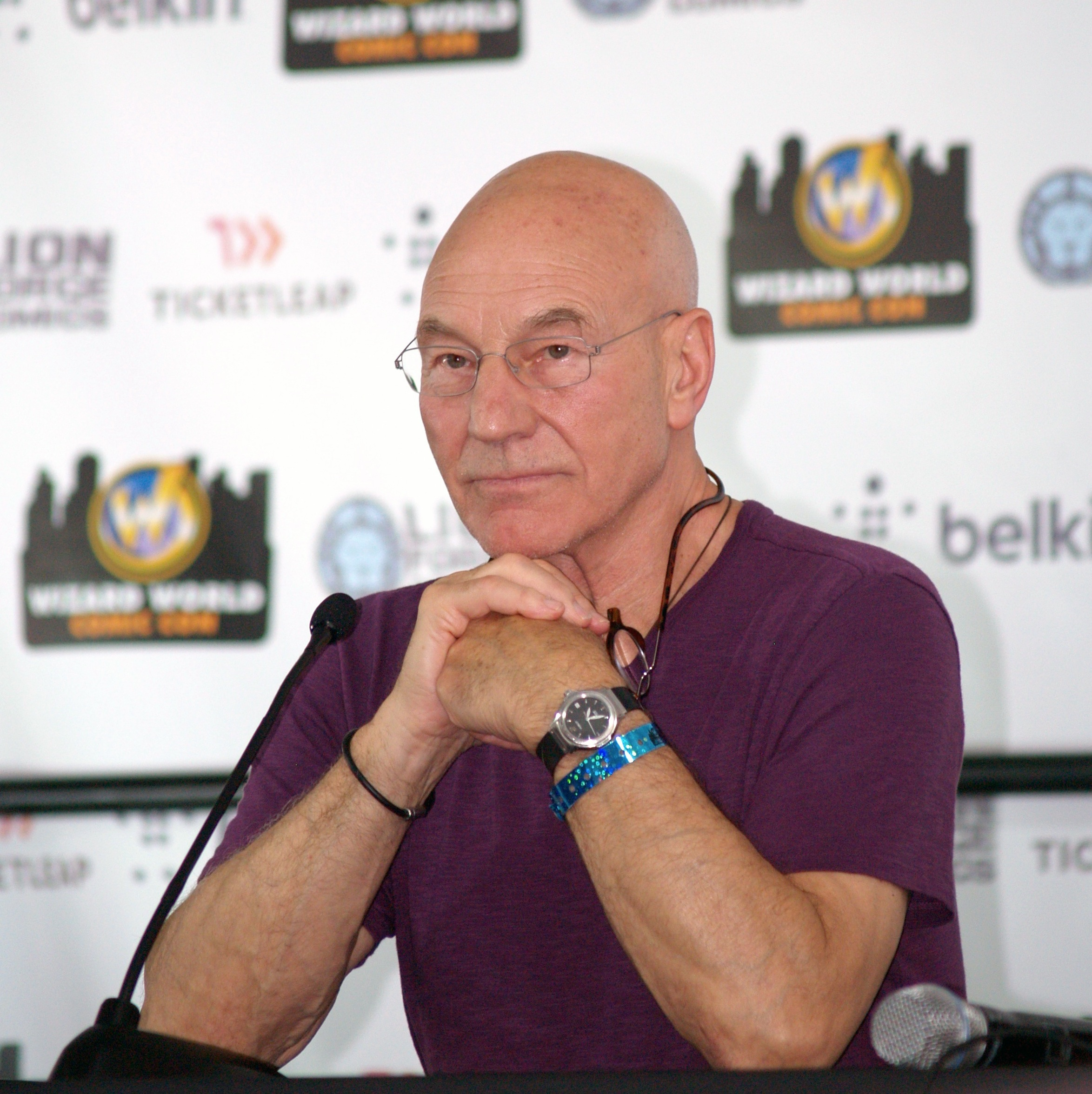
One reviewer called Patrick Stewart's performance "richly nuanced".

Reviewers responded positively to "Tapestry". Zack Handlen, writing for The A.V. Club, compared "Tapestry" to the television series Quantum Leap with the older Picard jumping into the younger man's body. He also said it had the "feel" of A Christmas Carol, and that it was a "modest episode with a modest goal: to remind us that [we] are the sum of all our parts, even the ones we aren't very proud of." He gave the episode a rating of "A".

In a review for Tor.com, Keith DeCandido compared the episode to It's a Wonderful Life, calling it one of the "finest hours" of the series. He praised "Tapestry" for endorsing the Q/Picard chemistry at the heart of Q episodes, and said that Stewart and de Lancie "play off each other magnificently". He gave it a rating of 9 out of 10.

In their book The Unauthorized Trek: The Complete Next Generation, James Van Hise and Hal Schuster described the scene where Picard was stabbed through the chest as "particularly violent", and overall said that "Tapestry" was a good story. They also described the view of Star Trek creator Gene Roddenberry towards religion, saying that in his world the Q Continuum aren't gods but are instead an "evolutionary niche higher than mere mortals". Mark Clark, in his book Star Trek FAQ 2.0, called Stewart's performance "richly nuanced" and "soul searching". Clark said that this episode was as important to Picard as the events in "The Best of Both Worlds", "The Inner Light" and "Chain of Command". He said that the events of "Tapestry" explored Picard's soul.

The episode has been included in "best of" lists for both specifically The Next Generation and more generally for the entire franchise. It ranked ninth on TV Guide's list of the top ten Star Trek episodes for the franchise's 30th anniversary, fourth in Entertainment Weekly's list of top ten Star Trek: The Next Generation episodes, 22nd out of the top 100 of the entire franchise in Charlie Jane Anders' list for io9, and seventh out of the various Star Trek episodes involving time travel by James Hunt at Den of Geek. Witney Seibold, on the website CraveOnline, said that "Tapestry" was the best installment of The Next Generation, describing it as "one of the more philosophical episodes". In 2016, Radio Times rated the scene where Picard wakes up to find Q in his bed as the 41st greatest scene in Star Trek. In 2014, Gizmodo ranked "Tapestry" as the 22nd best episode of Star Trek, out of over 700 episodes made by that time.

In 2016, IGN ranked "Tapestry" the 18th best episode of all Star Trek series.

In 2016 The Hollywood Reporter rated "Tapestry" the 16th best television episode of Star Trek. Geek.com rated the presentation of 'Lieutenant Picard' as one of the greatest moments in Star Trek. In 2018, Entertainment Weekly ranked "Tapestry" as one of the top ten moments of Jean-Luc Picard. In May 2019, The Hollywood Reporter ranked "Tapestry" among the top twenty five episodes of Star Trek: The Next Generation.

In 2017, Nerdist ranked "Tapestry" the seventh best episode of Star Trek: The Next Generation.

In 2017, SyFy rated the Nausicaans featured in this episode one of the top eleven most bizarre aliens of Star Trek: The Next Generation.

In 2017, Den of Geek ranked this episode as one of a top twenty five "must watch" episodes of Star Trek: The Next Generation.

In 2018, CBR ranked "Tapestry" the seventh best time-travel episode of all Star Trek.

In 2019, Screen Rant ranked "Tapestry" the ninth best episode of Star Trek: The Next Generation.

In 2020, IGN and Vulture listed "Tapestry" on a list of Star Trek: The Next Generation episodes to watch before Star Trek: Picard.

In 2021, Tom's Guide said this was the third best episode for the character Q, and compared it to the 1946 film It's a Wonderful Life.

== Home media and related releases ==
"Tapestry" was released in the United Kingdom on a two-episode VHS tape in 2003, alongside the first part of "Birthright". The first home media release of "Tapestry" in the United States was on a VHS box set entitled Star Trek – The Next Generation: The Q Continuum on June 18, 1996. It later received an individual release on August 4, 1998. Paramount deliberately delayed the individual release of Star Trek episodes on VHS within the United States in order to allow for the syndicated series to be shown once more in full. The inclusion of "Tapestry" in The Q Continuum boxed set ahead of the individual release of the episode was intended as an incentive to purchase the set.

The episode was released as part of the Star Trek: The Next Generation season six DVD box set in the United States on December 3, 2002. It received further releases on DVD as part of a compilation collections of episodes. This included The Jean-Luc Picard Collection, which was released in the United States on August 3, 2004, also the Star Trek: Q Fan Collective, which was released in the United States on June 6, 2006, and later that year in the UK on September 4. A further DVD release came as part of The Best of Star Trek: The Next Generation – Volume 2 on November 17, 2009, in the United States. The most recent release was the first on Blu-ray disc, which took place on June 24, 2014; this also added an audio commentary track for the episode for the first time.

DeCandido described Picard's laugh at being stabbed in "Tapestry" as being "critical to the plot" of his non-canonical Star Trek novel Q & A. The novel also includes Q's white room, and features a similar alternative universe where Picard followed a career in the sciences. A figure of Captain Picard based on "Tapestry" was released by Playmates Toys in 1996, which was a limited edition release of 1,701 units.
