= Extreme Measures (Star Trek: Deep Space Nine) =

- Star Trek: Deep Space Nine episode
- Episode no.: Season 7 Episode 23
- Directed by: Steve Posey
- Written by: Bradley Thompson; David Weddle
- Production code: 573
- Original air date: May 17, 1999

Guest appearances
- Andrew J. Robinson as Garak; William Sadler as Luther Sloan

Episode chronology
← Previous "Tacking Into the Wind"	Next → "The Dogs of War"
- Star Trek: Deep Space Nine season 7

"Extreme Measures" is the 173rd episode of the television series Star Trek: Deep Space Nine. The episode had over 4.3 million viewers when it first aired on television in May 1999, with a Nielsen rating of 4.3 points.

Set in the 24th century, the series follows the adventures of the crew of the Starfleet-managed space station Deep Space Nine near the planet Bajor, as the Bajorans recover from a decades-long occupation by the imperialistic Cardassians. The later seasons of the series follow a war between the United Federation of Planets and an expansionist empire known as the Dominion, ruled by the shapeshifting Changelings, which has already absorbed Cardassia.

This is the seventh episode of the concluding nine-episode story arc of the series, which brings the Dominion War and other story elements to a close. In episodes preceding this one, the Changelings have fallen victim to a mysterious disease, including Deep Space Nine's security chief Odo, a rogue Changeling who opposes the Dominion. The station physician Julian Bashir has inferred that the Federation's shadowy black ops agency, Section 31, infected Odo deliberately to transmit the disease to the Dominion's Founders. In this episode, Bashir and Chief Miles O'Brien invade the mind of a dying Section 31 agent to find a cure for the disease.

This episode was written by Bradley Thompson and David Weddle and it was directed by Steve Posey. William Sadler makes his third and final appearance as Section 31 operative Luther Sloan.

== Plot ==
The Changeling infection has taken its toll on Odo; Bashir estimates he has no more than two weeks to live. Odo asks his lover, Colonel Kira Nerys, to return to her mission aiding the Cardassian rebellion against Dominion rule, rather than stay to watch him die.

Bashir falsely announces that he has discovered a cure, aiming to lure a Section 31 agent to the station. Agent Sloan takes the bait, and Bashir captures him and prepares to interrogate him with a memory-scanning device to learn the cure for the Changeling disease. When Sloan sees no way to get out of Bashir's interrogation, he triggers an implant intended to destroy his brain functions and kill him. Bashir and O'Brien construct a device that will allow them to infiltrate Sloan's mind, knowing that they run the risk of dying with him.

Upon entering Sloan's mind, they are greeted by a personification of his subconscious. This Sloan apologizes to his family for choosing Section 31 over them, and is about to give Bashir the cure when it is killed by a personification of Sloan's loyalty to Section 31. Bashir and O'Brien are seemingly shot by a figure defending Sloan's secrets, and discuss their friendship before attempting to continue the search.

They seemingly awaken back in Bashir's lab, their mission a failure. In fact, they are still inside Sloan's mind, as Bashir realizes when he sits down in his quarters to read; his book ends where he stopped reading the previous night, and then starts over from the beginning on the next page. Realizing they have fallen for a stalling tactic, the two resume the search.

They find Sloan in a representation of his office, which is filled with secret data about Section 31, including the formula for the cure for the Changeling disease. Sloan taunts Bashir with the information in his mind, some of which would allow Bashir to dismantle Section 31 once and for all. Bashir is tempted, and begins to read. With seconds left before Sloan's brain shuts down, O'Brien recognizes that Sloan has laid a trap for them and tells Bashir to get them out of Sloan's mind. Having obtained the chemical formula for the cure, Bashir synthesizes it and administers it to Odo, curing him.

== Reception ==
The episode first aired on television May 17, 1999. It had Nielsen ratings of 4.3 points, and had over 4.3 million viewers.

Keith R.A. DeCandido, reviewing the episode in 2015 for Tor.com, gave it a rating of 4 out 10. He criticized the episode's slow pace and its focus on the Section 31 storyline at the expense of other plot lines in the concluding story arc.

In 2014, Zack Handlen, writing for The A.V. Club, called the episode "pretty clever", with well acted scenes; he enjoyed the relationship between O'Brien and Bashir.

In their book Make It So: Interaction Design Lessons from Science Fiction, Nathan Shedroff and Christopher Noessel note that this episode illustrates a common theme among virtual worlds in science fiction, in which characters have a hard time knowing when they have "woken up" or if they are still in the illusion.

== See also ==
- Section 31
- A Tale of Two Cities, 1859 novel by Charles Dickens mentioned in this episode
- Brainstorm, 1983 film about entering a mind to get information
