= A Matter of Time (Star Trek: The Next Generation) =

- Star Trek: The Next Generation episode
- Episode no.: Season 5 Episode 9
- Directed by: Paul Lynch
- Written by: Rick Berman
- Production code: 209
- Original air date: November 18, 1991

Guest appearances
- Matt Frewer - Berlinghoff Rasmussen; Stefan Gierasch - Hal Moseley; Sheila Franklin - Felton; Shay Garner - Female scientist

Episode chronology
← Previous "Unification"	Next → "New Ground"
- Star Trek: The Next Generation season 5

"A Matter of Time" is the 109th episode of the American science fiction television series Star Trek: The Next Generation, and the ninth episode of the fifth season. It aired in syndication on November 18, 1991.

Set in the 24th century, the series follows the adventures of the Starfleet crew of the Federation starship Enterprise-D. In this episode, the crew's attempts to save the inhabitants of Penthara IV from the devastating aftereffects of a massive asteroid strike are interrupted by the arrival of Berlinghoff Rasmussen, a purported historian from the 26th century, who claims to be studying their era. The rather curious nature of Rasmussen's questions about the 24th century, and his interest in gathering—and stealing—technological "artifacts" from the Enterprise-D, make Troi and the others increasingly suspicious of his origins.

The episode won an Emmy Award for Individual Achievement in Special Visual Effects.

== Plot ==
En route to Penthara IV to assist its population in combating the effects of reduced temperatures created by a dust cloud from a recent asteroid impact, the Enterprise encounters a nearby temporal distortion, and finds a small pod containing a single human occupant. Aboard the ship, the human introduces himself as Professor Berlinghoff Rasmussen (Matt Frewer), a researcher from the 26th century to witness the Enterprise complete this "historic" mission at Penthara IV. He requests interviews with the crew to obtain the full story, but reveals little about himself as he does not wish to alter history. Rasmussen's interviews are somewhat annoying to the crew but they entertain him.

At Penthara IV, the Enterprise uses its phasers to drill into the planet to release carbon dioxide, increasing the greenhouse effect to warm the planet, but this creates a side effect of increasing the seismic activity and causing volcanoes to erupt, threatening to send the planet into an ice age. Chief Engineer Geordi La Forge and Lt. Commander Data offer a solution of ionizing the upper atmosphere, but the maneuver must be done precisely or they could risk destroying the entire atmosphere and killing all 20 million on the surface. With the severity of the decision, Captain Jean-Luc Picard attempts to gain Rasmussen's help, claiming this is a scenario where the temporal prime-directive can be overridden, but Rasmussen refuses to offer advice, noting by his era, the fate of all those on Penthara IV has already been decided. Picard decides to allow La Forge and Data to go through with the plan, which is successful and returns the planet to its normal climate.

Rasmussen prepares to leave with his research done, but is met by a security team at his pod. Picard informs him several items have gone missing and requests to see the inside of his pod. Rasmussen reminds him again of the temporal prime directive, but after Picard insists, requests that Data can go in to look for their missing equipment without revealing anything about the future to the crew. Inside, Data finds the missing items but discovers Rasmussen has him at phaser-point. Rasmussen explains he is really a disgruntled inventor from 22nd century New Jersey that stole this pod from a 26th-century traveler, and intended to return to his time and profit by selling the Enterprise equipment as his inventions, and now that he has Data, he plans to take him back as well. However, Rasmussen finds his phaser does not work, as once he opened the pod, the ship's sensors were able to disable it. Data forces an anxious Rasmussen out of the pod. Rasmussen tries to apologize and asks to be allowed to depart, while Worf retrieves the stolen items. Picard instead has Rasmussen placed under arrest, and the pod automatically disappears to leave him stranded in the 24th century. Picard wryly notes to Rasmussen that some actual historians will be very keen to talk to him.

== Production ==
The role of Rasmussen was originally written for Robin Williams, but Williams couldn't take the role due to his commitments with Steven Spielberg's Hook.

== Awards ==
This episode won an Emmy Award for Individual Achievement in Special Visual Effects; a second award, in the same category (common at the time), went to the episode "Conundrum".

== Releases ==
The episode was released in the United States on November 5, 2002, as part of the Season 5 DVD box set. The first Blu-ray release was in the United States on November 18, 2013, followed by the United Kingdom the next day.
