= Tacking into the Wind =

- Star Trek: Deep Space Nine episode
- Episode no.: Season 7 Episode 22
- Directed by: Mike Vejar
- Written by: Ronald D. Moore
- Production code: 572
- Original air date: May 10, 1999

Guest appearances
- Andrew J. Robinson as Garak; Jeffrey Combs as Weyoun; Casey Biggs as Damar; J. G. Hertzler as Martok; Robert O'Reilly as Gowron; John Vickery as Rusot; Salome Jens as Female Changeling

Episode chronology
← Previous "When It Rains…"	Next → "Extreme Measures"
- Star Trek: Deep Space Nine season 7

"Tacking into the Wind" is the 172nd episode of the television series Star Trek: Deep Space Nine. The episode was written by Ronald D. Moore and directed by Mike Vejar.

Set in the 24th century, the series follows the adventures of the crew of the Starfleet-managed space station Deep Space Nine near the planet Bajor, as the Bajorans recover from a decades-long occupation by the imperialistic Cardassians. The later seasons of the series follow a war between the United Federation of Planets, allied with the Klingons, and an expansionist empire known as the Dominion, which has already absorbed Cardassia; the Dominion is ruled by the shapeshifting Changelings.

This is the sixth episode of the nine-episode concluding story arc of the series, which brings the Dominion War and other story elements to a close. In episodes preceding this one, the Cardassian leader Damar has launched a rebellion against Dominion rule, and Bajoran officer Kira Nerys has been sent to aid Damar's rebellion; the Dominion's allies, the Breen, have developed a weapon that can disable Federation ships, leaving the Klingons the only line of defense against the Dominion; and the Federation's shadowy black ops agency, Section 31, has infected the Changeling Founders of the Dominion with a deadly virus, using DS9's security chief Odo, a rogue Changeling, as a carrier. In this episode, Kira and Damar attempt to steal a Breen energy weapon for the rebellion, while the Klingon chancellor Gowron orders his fleet into dangerous missions that risk the war effort.

== Plot ==
The episode follows three plot lines. In the first, Kira, Odo, and Cardassian ex-spy Garak are advising Damar on guerrilla tactics to use against the Dominion. Kira has a tense relationship with Damar's second-in-command, Rusot, who disdains her tactical advice and distrusts her motives.

En route to attempt to steal a Breen energy-dampening weapon so the Federation can reverse-engineer a defensive counter-measure, Damar receives word that his family has been executed by the Dominion. Kira responds to his outrage by reminding him that the Cardassians committed similar atrocities during the Bajoran occupation; Damar is visibly taken aback by the comparison. Kira later regrets her words, but Garak points out they may be what Damar needs to hear to dislodge his romanticized view of the Cardassian empire.

They successfully steal a Dominion ship equipped with the Breen weapon, but Odo collapses as the illness overtakes him. Rusot tries to convince Damar to let him kill Kira and take the Breen weapon for Cardassia alone. Damar kills Rusot, giving up his vision of restoring the old Cardassia and instead choosing to try to create a better one.

In the second plotline, Gowron has been sending General Martok on doomed offensives against the Dominion. Worf, a Klingon member of Starfleet, suspects that Gowron's strategies are meant to humiliate Martok, whom Gowron sees as a political threat, regardless of the consequences for the Klingon Empire. He urges Martok to challenge Gowron, but Martok refuses to consider the idea.

Lt. Ezri Dax points out to Worf that if men as honorable as himself tolerate corruption at the highest levels, there is no hope for the Klingon Empire. During a meeting in which Gowron presents another suicidal plan of attack, Worf calls out Gowron as dishonorable. This leads to a duel in which Gowron at first seems to have the upper hand; he breaks Worf's bat'leth and throws him through a glass display board. When Gowron approaches to finish him off, Worf fatally stabs him with a piece of the broken bat'leth. By Klingon law, this makes Worf the new Chancellor. Worf refuses the robe of office and hands it to Martok, reminding him that "Great men do not seek power. They have power thrust upon them". Martok becomes the new Chancellor.

In the third plotline, Chief Miles O'Brien suggests that Dr. Julian Bashir falsely announce that he has found a cure for the Changeling disease in order to lure someone from Section 31, who may know the actual cure, to DS9.

== Reception ==
This had a Nielsen rating of 4.4 points, almost 4.35 million viewers when it was aired on television in 1999.

In 2018, CBR ranked this episode as part of the #1 episodic saga of Star Trek, ahead of "Best of Both Worlds" (Part I and II) from Star Trek: The Next Generation.
