= Sons of Mogh =

- Star Trek: Deep Space Nine episode
- Episode no.: Season 4 Episode 15
- Directed by: David Livingston
- Written by: Ronald D. Moore
- Production code: 48
- Original air date: February 12, 1996

Guest appearances
- Tony Todd as Kurn; Robert Doqui as Noggra; Dell Yount as Tilikia; D. Elliot Woods as Klingon Officer

Episode chronology
← Previous "Return to Grace"	Next → "Bar Association"
- Star Trek: Deep Space Nine season 4

"Sons of Mogh" is the 15th episode of the fourth season of Star Trek: Deep Space Nine, the 87th episode overall.

Set in the 24th century, the series follows the adventures on the Starfleet-run space station Deep Space Nine near the planet Bajor. This episode focuses on the Klingons, an alien race known for their warrior culture. Worf, the only Klingon officer in Starfleet, receives a visit from his brother Kurn, seeking help to escape the dishonor that has befallen their family.

This is the last of four appearances of Kurn, each played by actor Tony Todd, in the Star Trek franchise; he was first introduced on the series Star Trek: The Next Generation in the episode "Sins of the Father" (broadcast March 19, 1990).

== Plot ==
Worf gets an unexpected visit from his younger brother Kurn. Kurn confronts Worf about the dishonor Worf has brought upon their family, the House of Mogh, by rejecting the Klingon Empire's war with the Cardassian Empire. As a result of Worf's choices, his family has been stripped of its wealth, honor, and political power, leading to the collapse of the House of Mogh. Kurn has lost everything, and wants Worf to give him back his honor the only way he can, by having Worf ritually kill him. Worf begins the ceremony, but Worf's crewmate Jadzia Dax figures out what he is planning. She and security chief Odo rush to interrupt the ceremony but only after Kurn is stabbed. Dr. Bashir manages to save him. Captain Sisko is furious and forbids Worf from completing the ceremony.

Kurn, without an honorable life or death, places himself in Worf's hands. At Dax's suggestion, Worf asks Odo for a favor and gets Kurn a position with Odo's security force. However Kurn soon loses his job when he allows himself to be shot without any attempt to defend himself.

Meanwhile, mysterious explosions and cloaked Klingon vessels have been observed near Bajoran space. Eventually it is discovered that the Klingons are secretly mining the space around Deep Space Nine in preparation for a future war. Worf and Kurn are sent on an undercover mission to discover the mines' locations and activation codes. They are able to access the data, though Kurn is forced to shoot a Klingon officer in order to defend Worf. Using this intelligence, Major Kira is able to detonate the mines and flush out the cloaked Klingon vessels.

Having killed a man who was acting in defense of the Klingon Empire deepens Kurn's depression. Worf is distressed that he did not realize the Klingon officer intended to kill him—feeling that a real Klingon would have. He comes to the conclusion that he is not of the Klingon or human world, but he has his Starfleet rank, and Kurn has nothing at all. To allow Kurn to live an honorable life as a Klingon, Worf has Dr. Bashir erase Kurn's memory so he can be given a new identity. Kurn—now "Rodek"—is then entrusted to a family friend who agrees to take him in as a son. In the last scene he looks to Worf and asks him, "Are you part of my family?", to which Worf replies: "I have no family."

== Production ==
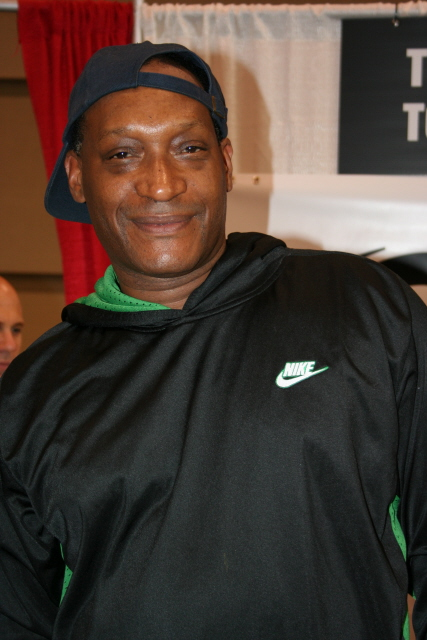
Tony Todd returns as Worf's brother Kurn

The producer considered the possibility of bringing back Rodek, son of Noggra, but the follow-up never happened on screen. Rodek returned in several Star Trek novels including "A Burning House" by Keith R. A. DeCandido set four year later, where his memory begins to return.

== Reception ==
In a 2013 review, Zack Handlen The A.V. Club wrote, the story works "because of the emotion behind it. The details don’t matter; what matters is that Worf is permanently cutting himself apart from the only Klingon relative he has left. To save his brother, he has to lose him, and it's ridiculous and tragic all at once." Tor.com rated the episode 7 out of 10.

In 2018, SyFy included this episode on their Jadzia Dax binge-watching guide.

In 2020, Io9 said this was one of the "must watch" episodes from the series.
