= Worf =

Fictional character from Star Trek

Worf wo'rIv
- Star Trek character
- Worf as he appears during Star Trek: The Next Generation's seventh season
- First appearance: "Encounter at Farpoint" (1987) (The Next Generation)
- Last appearance: "The Last Generation" (2023; Star Trek: Picard)
- Created by: Gene Roddenberry; D. C. Fontana
- Portrayed by: Michael Dorn

In-universe information
- Nicknames: "Son of Mogh" (The Next Generation) "Microbrain" (The Next Generation) "Turtle Head" (Insurrection)
- Species: Klingon
- Affiliation: United Federation of Planets; Starfleet; Klingon Empire; House of Martok; House of Mogh
- Family: Biological family Colonel Worf (grandfather); Mogh (deceased father); Kurn (brother); Adoptive family Sergey Rozhenko (father); Helena Rozhenko (mother); Nikolai Rozhenko (brother); Jeremy Aster (R'uustai Brother)
- Spouse: Jadzia Dax (deceased)
- Significant other: K'Ehleyr (deceased)
- Children: Alexander Rozhenko
- Posting: Various Starfleet Intelligence locations (Star Trek: Picard season 3); USS Enterprise-E (Star Trek: Nemesis); Qo'noS (DS9 season 7); Deep Space Nine; (DS9 seasons 4–7); USS Defiant; (DS9 seasons 4–7); USS Enterprise-D; (Star Trek: The Next Generation seasons 1–7, Star Trek Generations)
- Position: Subcontractor agent; (Starfleet Intelligence); Chancellor of the Klingon Empire (for 52 seconds); Ambassador to the Klingon Empire; (United Federation of Planets); Strategic Operations Officer; (Deep Space Nine); First Officer; (USS Defiant); Chief Security Officer, Tactical Officer; (USS Enterprise-D)
- Rank: Captain; (Picard season 3); Lieutenant Commander; (DS9, movies); Lieutenant; (The Next Generation seasons 3–7); Lieutenant junior grade; (The Next Generation season 1–2)

Worf, son of Mogh is a fictional character in the Star Trek franchise, portrayed by actor Michael Dorn. He appears in the television series Star Trek: The Next Generation (TNG), seasons four through seven of Star Trek: Deep Space Nine (DS9), and the third and final season of Star Trek: Picard, as well as the feature films Star Trek Generations (1994), Star Trek: First Contact (1996), Star Trek: Insurrection (1998), and Star Trek: Nemesis (2002).

Worf is the first Klingon main character to appear in Star Trek. In 11 seasons as a regular character on TNG and DS9, plus appearances as a recurring character in Picard, Worf has appeared in more Star Trek franchise episodes than any other character.

== Casting ==
Initially, Worf was not intended to be a regular character, as Gene Roddenberry wanted to avoid "retreads of characters or races featured prominently in the original Star Trek series". Accordingly, a cast portrait released in June 1987 to promote the upcoming series did not include Worf. Several "tall, slim, black actors" auditioned for Worf before Michael Dorn came along. Not only did the Worf character become a regular on The Next Generation (TNG), he was continued on the Deep Space Nine (DS9) series for four more seasons (1995–99) and talk of a spin-off Worf show continued even into the 2010s.

He made his debut in 1987 in "Encounter at Farpoint", and last appeared in character in 2023 in Picard season 3. Dorn as Worf made 283 on-screen appearances, the most of any actor in the Star Trek franchise.

== Family history ==
Worf was orphaned as a child as a result of the Khitomer Massacre, and raised by humans Helena and Sergey Rozhenko. In one episode, the character says he was raised on the farm world Gault and in others he says he was raised in Russia near the Ural Mountains. He experiences conflicts between his upbringing and his desire to honor his biological heritage. He has two brothers, each with their own respective backstories, as well as two adoptive human parents, and one son. Important Star Trek episodes for Worf's family include "The Bonding", "Sins of the Father", "Family", "Reunion" and "Homeward" in The Next Generation, and "Sons of Mogh" and "You Are Cordially Invited" in Deep Space Nine.

The House of Mogh was a family of high social and political rank; for a time, they were also represented on the Klingon High Council. In Star Trek VI: The Undiscovered Country (set around 70 years before the Next Generation era began), Colonel Worf (also portrayed by Dorn) appears as the legal advocate of Captain James T. Kirk and Dr. Leonard McCoy after they are accused of killing Chancellor Gorkon of the Klingon High Council. He was also a member of the Klingon delegation at Camp Khitomer. Although not explicitly stated, he was intended to be Worf's grandfather and namesake.

Worf has a son named Alexander with a half-human half-Klingon woman named K'Ehleyr, a character introduced in "The Emissary"; however, she is later killed in "Reunion", a "sequel" to that episode and part of the Worf story arc, leaving Worf as a single parent. Alexander has to live aboard Enterprise-D when K'Ehleyr is killed. After TNG ends, Worf gets moved to the Deep Space Nine space station where he eventually marries the Trill symbiont Jadzia Dax. (See "You Are Cordially Invited".) On DS9, Worf misses the Enterprise-D "family" that he had, often bemoaning the cut-rate work ethic and unfriendliness on the wayward outpost.

The episode "Sins of the Father" introduces Worf's long-lost brother Kurn, who is also an orphan of the House of Mogh. Worf's adoptive parents have a biological son, Nikolai Rozhenko, with whom Worf grew up. Nikolai and Worf talk in "Homeward", where it is revealed that Worf will likely have a nephew or niece.

In "The Bonding" (TNG S3E5, aired 1989), Worf adopts an orphan boy into the House of Mogh. In the first Star Trek episode written by screenwriter Ron Moore, the orphan Jeremy (played by Gabriel Damon) has a special Klingon ceremony to be adopted into Worf's family.

Join me in the R'uustai, the Bonding. You will become part of my family now and for all time. We will be brothers.

– Worf to Jeremy, "The Bonding"

== Storylines ==
=== Backstory ===
Worf was born in 2340 on Qo'noS (the Klingon homeworld) as the son of Mogh. Five years later, his parents moved to the Khitomer colony. Worf's parents were killed during a surprise attack by the Romulans on the Khitomer outpost. The colony's distress call was answered by the Federation starship USS Intrepid. Chief Petty Officer Sergey Rozhenko found Worf in the rubble and took him in after failing to find any living relatives. Rozhenko and his wife Helena raised him on a small farm colony on the planet Gault, a world of about 20,000 inhabitants, almost all of them human. Worf also has a human brother, Nikolai, with whom he often quarreled. He also spent time on Earth in his parents' native city of Minsk, later recommending it to Miles O'Brien as one of his favorite places on Earth.

Worf did not take the Rozhenkos' last name, preferring to be addressed by the Klingon designation, "Worf, son of Mogh". However, his son, Alexander Rozhenko, who was raised by the Rozhenkos after his mother, K'Ehleyr, died, did use their surname. Although Worf was raised by humans, he considered himself a Klingon at heart and studied in-depth the ways of his people. As an adult, his mannerisms and personality, as well as his innate sense of honor, became more Klingon than human.

Worf's brother Kurn, barely a year old at the time of the Khitomer attack, had been left behind on the Klingon homeworld Qo'noS by his parents. Lorgh, a friend to House of Mogh (appearing only in dialog of the episode "Sins of the Father"), was charged with the care of the younger son, originally expecting Mogh's stay at the Khitomer outpost to be short-term. Lorgh adopted Kurn after the attack, but informed Klingon authorities that he had died with the rest of the family. Kurn was not revealed as being alive until both brothers were adults.

In 2357, Worf entered Starfleet Academy. He graduated in 2361 and was commissioned with the rank of Ensign, becoming the first Klingon officer in Starfleet. Although Worf took immense pride and a sense of honor from serving in Starfleet, most other Klingons shunned and belittled his choice of vocation.

In 2359, he became briefly involved with K'Ehleyr who was the daughter of a Klingon father and a human mother.

=== The Next Generation ===
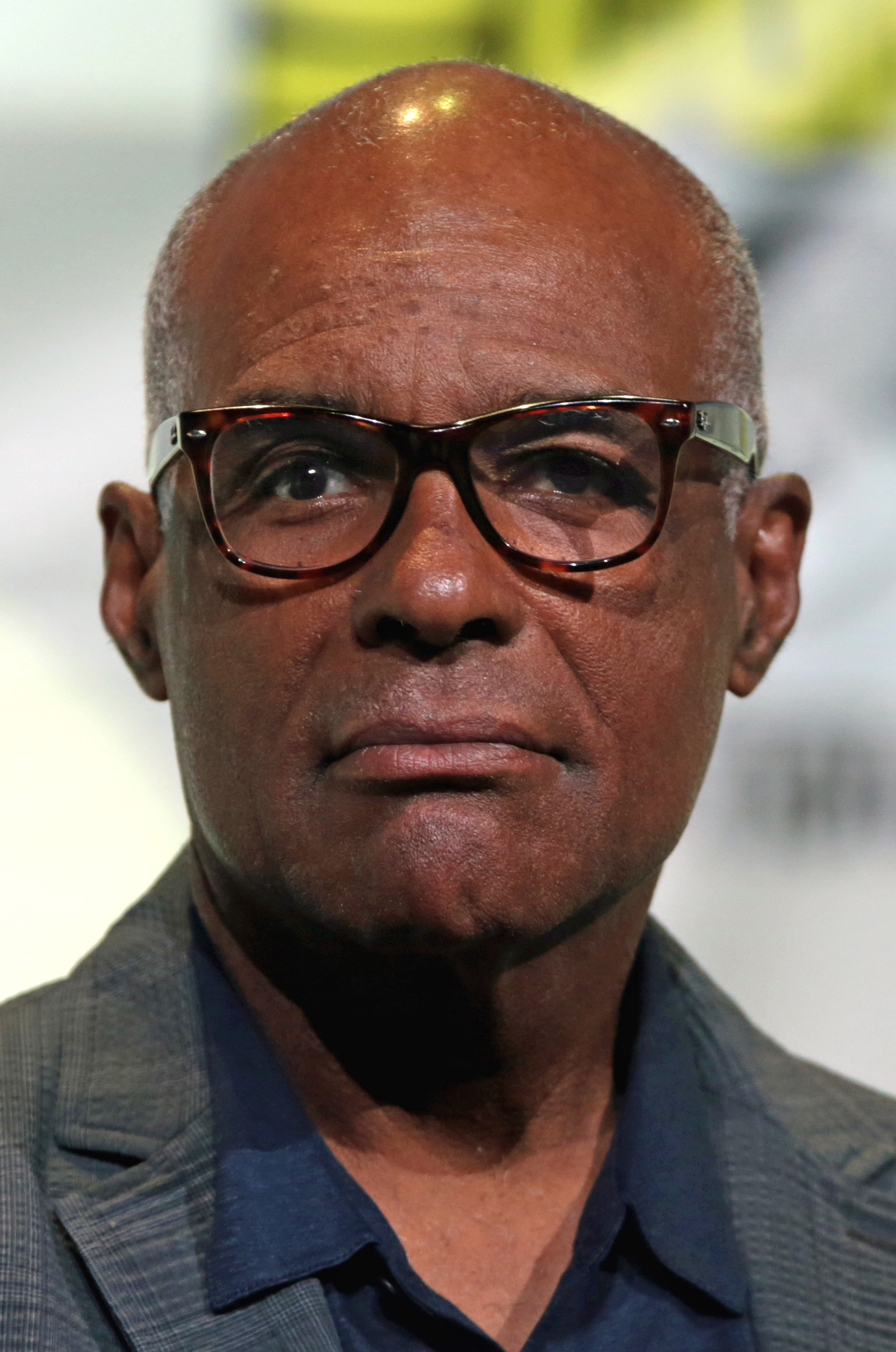
Actor Michael Dorn portrayed Worf.

In 2364, Worf was assigned to the USS Enterprise-D as relief flight control and tactical officer with the rank of lieutenant junior grade (TNG: "Encounter at Farpoint") under the command of Captain Jean-Luc Picard. The next year, he was made Acting Chief of Security following the death of Tasha Yar, even though he believed that a promotion due to the death of a comrade was not honorable (TNG: "Skin of Evil"). The next year, he transferred to operations division and was formally made Chief of Security (TNG: "The Child").

In 2365, he renewed his relationship with K'Ehleyr when she came aboard the Enterprise as a Federation emissary on an urgent mission. He proposed marriage but was rejected (TNG: "The Emissary").

In 2366, he was promoted to Lieutenant (TNG: "Evolution"). After an accident caused the death of Lt. Marla Astor, Worf brought the orphaned Jeremy Astor into the House of Mogh through the rite of R'uustai (TNG: "The Bonding").

Worf learned of Kurn's existence when Kurn was assigned to the Enterprise as an exchange officer. Kurn specifically asked for the Enterprise so he could observe his brother. He then revealed his true identity, informing Worf that the House of Mogh's rival Duras accused their father of betraying the Klingon Empire by helping the Romulans attack Khitomer. When they and the Enterprise crew discovered that it was in fact Duras's father who betrayed the Empire, Worf, realizing that the powerful House of Duras could not be publicly shamed without throwing the Empire into civil war, accepted a ritual discommendation from the Klingon High Council. While Worf decided to accept this dishonor, it was decided to keep Kurn's true identity secret in order to protect his honor (and the House of Mogh as a whole be left alone) (TNG: "Sins of the Father").

In 2367, K'Ehleyr returned with Klingon Chancellor K'mpec who had come to meet with Captain Picard. When she came aboard, Worf learned he had a son named Alexander. She wanted to marry him but Worf refused because he did not want to share his dishonor with her and their son (TNG: "Reunion").

After K'mpec's death, she assisted Captain Picard with the rite of succession. K'Ehleyr was eventually murdered by Duras when she found evidence of his involvement in the effort to discredit Worf (and why he was discommended). Exercising his right of vengeance, Worf fought and killed Duras with a bat'leth in a duel, allowing Duras's political opponent Gowron to become chancellor (TNG: "Reunion").

A civil war erupted when the Duras's son Toral challenged Gowron. Worf believed Gowron was the legitimate ruler and convinced his brother to bring forces loyal to him into battle on Gowron's behalf. Worf resigned from Starfleet to fight for Gowron and served on his brother's ship. Gowron won the war after Starfleet exposed Romulan support for the House of Duras. In appreciation of his support, Chancellor Gowron restored Worf's honor, allowing Kurn a seat on the High Council as the recognized brother and representative of the House of Mogh (TNG: "Redemption, Part I"). Once the war was over, Worf regained his Starfleet commission, recognizing that he did not fully belong to Klingon society (TNG: "Redemption, Part II").

In 2369, while the Enterprise was at Deep Space Nine, Worf investigated a claim that his father might still be alive in a Romulan prison camp. His father was not there (having indeed been killed during the battle at Khitomer), but a number of Klingons were living there with the Romulans. Unable to return home with honor, as Klingons are supposed to commit suicide rather than be taken prisoner, they stayed and strayed from their way of life. Worf's visit had a profound effect on the children of the prisoners and many chose to leave with him (TNG: Birthright).

Worf's visit to the camp caused him to reconsider his own beliefs. He visited the monastery at Boreth to meditate. One day, a man appeared before him claiming to be Kahless the Unforgettable who had returned to lead the Empire once more. Worf was willing to consider the idea that Kahless was genuine because he believed the Klingons had lost their ways. Gowron was skeptical. He questioned Kahless about details of his memories, which Kahless could not recall, and then challenged Kahless to combat, defeating him easily. The loss forced the clerics to reveal that they had created a clone of Kahless and implanted ancient scriptures of Kahless's battles as his memories. Despite this, Worf became convinced that the Klingons would make a leap of faith and accept him as the legitimate heir of Kahless. He convinced the Klingons to appoint the new Kahless as Emperor. While real power remained with Gowron as head of government, the Emperor would be the formal head of state and teach the stories of Kahless. Gowron was induced to go along with this arrangement when Worf threatened in private otherwise to oppose him publicly, which Gowron, still not fully in control of the Empire, could not afford. (TNG: "Rightful Heir").

Worf avoided romantic attachments with non-Klingons during his first few years onboard the Enterprise-D. As Worf explained to both Commander Riker and Guinan, he felt that non-Klingon females would be too fragile, and that he would have to restrain himself too much. He eventually developed strong feelings for Counselor Deanna Troi, and explored a relationship with her for a time, which at times strained his relationship with her former romantic interest, Commander Riker. Worf and Troi seemed to end their relationship following the destruction of the Enterprise-D at Veridian III and Worf's reassignment to Deep Space Nine.

=== Deep Space Nine ===
In 2371, he was promoted to lieutenant commander (Star Trek Generations). After the destruction of the Enterprise-D, Worf took an extended leave to evaluate his future. He was at a monastery on the Klingon colony of Boreth when he was ordered to go to Deep Space Nine to advise Captain Sisko when a Klingon fleet massed at the station. When he arrived, he was met by former Enterprise-D crew member and Deep Space Nine Chief of Operations Miles O'Brien. (DS9: "The Way of the Warrior").

Worf learned that the Klingons were planning to invade Cardassia because of a coup which they had been led to believe was engineered by the Dominion. Worf reluctantly informed Sisko, knowing this would jeopardize his status in the empire. After the invasion had begun, Gowron traveled to DS9 to ask Worf to join him in battle. Gowron believed the Federation was unworthy of Worf's loyalty because they would not fight the Dominion. Worf felt the war was wrong and he could not support it. Gowron punished him by reinstating Worf's discommendation, but this time executing it to the full degree, by stripping him and his family of his honor, lands, and titles, effectively bringing down the House of Mogh.

Worf submitted his resignation but Sisko rejected it because he still needed him. He had decided to rescue the members of the Cardassian council from certain death at the hands of the Klingons. In doing so, he was able to prove that there was no Dominion involvement by verifying their identities. The Klingons attacked the station in order to capture the council members but withdrew as Starfleet ships approached, fearing a war on two fronts.

At the end of the immediate crisis, Sisko convinced Worf to join the crew as Strategic Operations officer. In this role, he would coordinate all Starfleet activity in the Bajoran sector and act as executive officer of the USS Defiant, meaning he had to adjust to the requirements and obligations that came with the red "command personnel" uniform. For the first months, Worf had difficulties adjusting to life on the station, unintentionally overstepping his boundaries by acting as he did on the Enterprise, putting him for a while at odds with Chief of Security Odo. For Worf, the station's life seemed just too much 'grey', subsequently requesting to relocate his quarters aboard Defiant.

After the Klingon civil war, Kurn had gained a seat on the High Council. Worf's opposition to the war against Cardassia cost Kurn his seat on the council. Four months later, he arrived at DS9 seeking help from his brother to perform a ritual to die with honor. He felt that the ritual, which involved Worf killing him, was the only way to restore his honor. Initially disregarding orders from Sisko not to carry out the honor killing, Worf failed in his first attempt to perform the ritual and later found he could not bring himself to do so again, as he had taken on a human feature of morality and would consider it murdering his brother. Worf arranged for his brother to have cosmetic surgery and his memory wiped so he could start a new life with no ties to the House of Mogh. Kurn now has the identity of Rodek, who believes he lost his memory after being hit by a plasma discharge (DS9 episode "Sons of Mogh"). When Rodek sees Worf, he asks him whether he is family. Worf bitterly replies that he has no family.

After a year of war between the Federation and the Klingons, Worf joined a team sent to investigate claims that Gowron was a changeling in disguise. Worf nearly killed Gowron in combat but at the last moment the impostor was revealed to be disguised as Gowron's military adviser General Martok. The discovery helped restore peace between the Federation and the Klingons and to Worf again being shunned by Gowron for not having killed him when he had the chance, reaffirming his dishonor. (DS9: "Broken Link", "Apocalypse Rising").

In early 2373, Worf became involved with DS9 science officer Jadzia Dax, a Trill woman. She was familiar with Klingon customs due to the experience of the Dax symbiont's previous host, Curzon. She was the first non-Klingon that Worf could "physically" be with in the traditional Klingon way, although it still left bruises, cuts and broken bones.

While on a mission to the Gamma Quadrant, Worf was captured by the Dominion and sent to a Jem'Hadar prison camp where he met the real General Martok and was reunited with the real Dr. Bashir, who had both been captured and replaced by changelings. While the prisoners worked to escape, Worf entered a daily round of combat with each of the guards in turn. He earned the respect and admiration of Martok and even of the guards because he would not yield. Once the prisoners escaped, they managed to warn the station about the Bashir-changeling.

Upon their return, Martok was assigned command of the Klingon detachment on Deep Space Nine and command of the IKS Rotarran. Martok asked Worf to be his first officer. The ship had suffered many losses to the Dominion, and morale was low. Martok's refusal to engage the enemy, due to his Dominion incarceration, made things worse. Worf challenged him for command, but allowed Martok to win and retain command. This led to Martok regaining his warrior's courage and, with renewed vigor, he led the crew to their first victory against the Dominion. Understanding what Worf had done, Martok thanked him for reminding him of his duty as a soldier and offered him a place in his house as his brother. By joining the House of Martok, Worf's status in the empire was restored (albeit the House of Mogh remains stricken). Worf's son, Alexander, was also assigned to the Rotarran after joining the Klingon Defense Force. Though Worf was initially estranged by his now adult son, and skeptical of his son's desire to serve the Empire, he eventually reconciled with him, and his son joined the House of Martok as well. Worf continued to serve on the Rotarran after Sisko withdrew from DS9 at the beginning of the Dominion War.

When Sisko eventually returned with a fleet of Federation ships to retake the station, Worf and Martok lobbied Gowron to send Klingon ships to join the battle. The entry of the Klingon ships turned the tide and allowed the Defiant to break through and retake the station (DS9: "Favor the Bold", "Sacrifice of Angels").

Having helped liberate the station, Worf and Jadzia decided to get married. The wedding was a traditional Klingon ceremony which included a series of trials on Jadzia's part in order to gain the approval of Martok's wife to join the House of Martok. This almost ended in disaster, as the free-spirited Jadzia felt forced into a position rather than taking the matter seriously enough. Eventually, realizing its importance to Worf and counseled by Sisko that she needed to mature, Jadzia yielded and she was allowed to marry Worf. (DS9: "You Are Cordially Invited").

In the DS9 episode "Change of Heart", Worf prematurely ended a mission to contact a Cardassian informant inside the Dominion in order to save his injured wife. The informant was subsequently executed by the Dominion, causing Captain Sisko to officially caution that Starfleet might not grant Worf his own command after this incident (being another official reprimand in Worf's records of consequence). However, Sisko added that, had he been forced to choose between his duty and his wife, he would have done the same thing.

By late 2374, Worf and Jadzia were married less than a year when they decided to try to have a child, despite the extreme difficulties posed by the disparate biologies of Trill and Klingons. While Worf was away during a mission, Jadzia visited the Bajoran temple on the station where she was attacked and killed by an alien possessing the body of Gul Dukat, who had come aboard the station to destroy an Orb of the Prophet. (DS9: "Time's Orphan", "Tears of the Prophets")

Julian Bashir was able to save the Dax symbiont, which was sent back to the Trill homeworld to be rejoined with a new host aboard the USS Destiny. When the symbiont's health worsened, the Dax symbiont was implanted into a new host named Ezri Dax, who was the assistant ship's counselor. She had not been trained to be a host, but she was the only available unjoined Trill aboard. Ezri had difficulty making the transition and sought out Ben Sisko on Earth.

In 2375, Worf led a mission to destroy a Dominion shipyard. He dedicated this mission to his late wife, in order to ensure her entry into Sto-Vo-kor, the Valhalla-like realm of the honored dead, being joined by Quark, Bashir and O'Brien (DS9: "Shadows and Symbols").

Ezri helped Sisko on his mission, and then returned to DS9 with him (DS9: "Shadows and Symbols"). She accepted his request to stay on as station counselor. Worf avoided Ezri at first, confused about what to do about this new situation. Her quick posting to DS9 led to a number of awkward moments between her and Worf, since the new host carried all the memories of their former hosts but had its own distinct personality, despite their shared past. Also, it was considered taboo on Trill for new hosts to fraternize with former lovers. After a brief rekindling of their feelings for one another, they decided that things were just too different and, eventually, the two settled into a comfortable friendship, with Ezri eventually becoming romantically involved with Julian Bashir (who previously had feelings for Jadzia). This allowed Worf to accept 'his' Jadzia to have her place into Sto-Vo-Kor.

In 2375, Worf became concerned with the leadership of Gowron. The entry of the Breen into the war on the side of the Dominion temporarily sidelined the Federation and Romulan fleets, which proved vulnerable to Breen weaponry. This left the Klingons alone to carry on the fight as their ships were not affected in the same manner. Gowron assumed direct command because he feared Martok's growing popularity and devised a plan to discredit Martok. He began ordering Martok on near-suicidal missions against Dominion forces, hoping that a string of defeats would weaken Martok's popularity and discredit him as a military leader. Recognizing that Gowron was jeopardizing the entire war effort for the sake of his personal pride, Worf tried to convince Martok that he should challenge Gowron for the leadership. After Martok refused, Worf challenged Gowron himself, citing his faulty battle planning, his dishonorable conduct in trying to discredit Martok, and poor strategies at the later stages of the Dominion War. After a brief battle, Worf killed Gowron; by right, he was proclaimed the new chancellor of the Klingon High Council. However, Worf declined in favor of Martok (DS9: "Tacking Into the Wind"). Ironically, it was again by Worf's hand the next chancellor of the Empire was decided (having slain Duras to allow Gowron's ascension after K'mpec's death), and the second time he and Gowron dueled, this time finishing Gowron off. As a token of respect, Worf performed the Klingon Death Howl after Gowron's death, essentially forgiving his misdeeds and recognizing a worthy warrior was on his way to Sto-Vo-Kor.

After the conclusion of the Dominion War, Worf was offered the position of the Federation ambassador to Qo'noS (the Klingon homeworld), as depicted in the Star Trek: Deep Space Nine series finale "What You Leave Behind".

=== Star Trek films ===
Worf continued to appear in TNG films. His appearances are explained in various ways, such as being rescued from the damaged Defiant during a battle with the Borg (Star Trek: First Contact) and taking leave that led to him traveling on the Enterprise (Star Trek: Insurrection). Star Trek: Nemesis was released after the conclusion of DS9 and Worf's status at this time is unclear, although the novelization stated that Worf returned to Starfleet as he found life as an ambassador unsatisfying. Worf attended the wedding of William Riker and Deanna Troi on Earth and traveled to Betazed with the Enterprise crew for the second wedding ceremony when the ship was diverted to investigate positronic signals from a system near the Romulan border.

=== Star Trek: Picard ===
By the time of Star Trek: Picard, Worf has become a subcontractor for Starfleet Intelligence, having attained the rank of Captain and briefly commanded the Enterprise-E beforehand. Worf has mellowed with age, no longer giving in to impulse; even adopting a fondness for meditation and tea in his free time, having seemingly given up Klingon opera. It is also revealed that something happened to the Enterprise-E under Worf's command that renders it unusable by the time of Star Trek: Picard, something that Worf insists was not his fault.

A contact (heavily implied to be Odo) has made Worf aware that a group of Changelings objected to the Dominion's surrender and began a campaign against the Federation, prompting Worf to mount an investigation into their activities, assisted by Raffi Musiker and supervised by Ro Laren. Worf and Raffi interrogate multiple criminal co-conspirators, including the Ferengi Sneed and the Vulcan Krinn, finding that the Changeling group has infiltrated the highest levels of Starfleet and burgled its most advanced lab the Daystrom Institute to restart the Dominion War. He is reunited with Picard and the rest of the Enterprise crew, including a resurrected Data, throughout the third season, whereupon he helps Picard defeat the Changelings' collaborators, the Borg, using the rebuilt Enterprise-D. Worf also helps Musiker reunite with her estranged family by secretly leaking her heroic deeds to them. He is last seen playing poker with his Enterprise crewmates at the Ten Forward bar in Los Angeles, content with his life.

=== Alternate versions ===
In 2370 after returning from a tournament, Worf encountered a quantum fissure and began shifting into different realities. In one reality, he became involved with Deanna Troi while recovering from a spinal injury. He asked permission from Commander Riker to court Troi. By the time the events in this episode takes place, he has been married to her for two years. In another reality, Worf is first officer of the Enterprise, serving under Capt. Riker, who assumed command after Capt. Picard was killed by the Borg. He is married to Deanna Troi and has a daughter Shannara Rozhenko and a son Eric Christopher Rozhenko. However, she doesn't know anything about Alexander (TNG: "Parallels").

In an alternate future, Alexander becomes a diplomat instead of a warrior. He wanted to end the feuding among the great houses and declared that the House of Mogh would no longer engage in blood feuds. Worf warned him that this was a show of weakness but Alexander persisted. Shortly after Alexander's decision, he witnesses Worf being killed on the floor of the High Council. Had he become a warrior, he thinks perhaps he could have saved his father's life. Eventually, he finds a way to travel back in time to try to prevent these events from occurring by convincing his younger self to train to become a warrior while under the assumed name of K'Mtar, but Worf convinces him to return to the future with assurances that he has already changed his own history (TNG: "Firstborn").

In an alternate future, Worf had been reluctant to become involved with Troi and her subsequent death led to a rift between Riker and himself as a result. He later served as a member of the Klingon High Council and was governor of the Klingon colony of H'atoria with his fellow Klingons possibly at the brink of war with the Federation after conquering the Romulan Star Empire. Nevertheless, he helps his old crewmates with the threat of an anti-time eruption, and Riker makes a conciliatory gesture to his old friend, asking for his help on the Enterprise bridge during the situation, which Worf accepts (TNG: "All Good Things").

While on a mission in the Gamma Quadrant, the Defiant detects an energy barrier surrounding a planet in a nearby solar system. When they enter the barrier, the ship is damaged and they detect a settlement with 8,000 people who are mostly human. When they investigate, they learn they have been expected. The settlers explain they are the descendants of the Defiant crew. In a couple of days, when the Defiant tries to leave orbit, they will be thrown back in time two centuries and crash land on the planet. Worf learns he married and raised a family. He meets his descendant Brota who leads the Sons of Mogh. The members are descendants of Worf and Jadzia and others who choose to join them. They follow Klingon customs as first taught to them by Worf (DS9: "Children of Time").

In the mirror universe, Worf leads the Klingon-Cardassian Alliance as Regent. After Terran rebels take over Terok Nor, Worf tries to recapture the station but is defeated by the rebels who have a new ship based on the design of the Defiant from the prime universe. Enraged, Worf claimed he lost only because he had been betrayed, with the Mirror Garak blaming Intendant Kira Nerys as the likely source (DS9: "Shattered Mirror"). Eventually, Worf captured her and Grand Nagus Zek who crossed over to this universe to open new markets. Worf agreed to let Zek go in exchange for a cloaking device, but the device was sabotaged and his ship was disabled, allowing the Terran rebels to capture him (DS9: "The Emperor's New Cloak").

== Possible spinoff ==
Due to Worf's popularity there was some talk of a Captain Worf series prior to the streaming television spinoffs that began in 2017. In 2012, Dorn conceived the idea for a Worf show, and has pitched it at various times in the 2010s. He was reportedly offered a role as a Worf-ancestor on Star Trek: Discovery but this did not come to fruition. In 2021, Dorn, in addressing rumors that he might appear on Star Trek: Picard, said he was still interested in a movie or series with Worf.

== References in other media ==
Worf has appeared in various TV, film, book, and video games, as well as being referenced in non-franchise media such as through satire.

=== Video games ===
Worf fights a Jem'Hadar soldier with an energy weapon in Star Trek: Deep Space Nine: The Fallen.

In Star Trek: Deep Space Nine: The Fallen, Commander Worf is one of the three main playable characters in the computer game Star Trek: Deep Space Nine: The Fallen. In the game the player can play as Worf, and the game had generally favorable reviews, with on reviewer saying it has a "compelling storyline". It was published in 2000 for Windows and 2001 for Macintosh.

In Star Trek: Invasion, Commander Worf is part of the 2000 Sony PlayStation video game Star Trek: Invasion. In the game, the player gets instructions from Worf, and the game received generally favorable reviews.

=== Television ===
The series finale of Webster has the titular character go into the future to the Enterprise-D bridge, where he encounters several unnamed Enterprise crew members and Worf. Worf initially tells Webster he cannot return him to his time due to the Enterprise's inability to escape the gravitational pull of a planet, but eventually, they are able to reverse-engineer the process that transported Webster to the future, and return him home. Webster wakes up from what seems to have been a dream.

During the film Ted 2, Michael Dorn appears as a character by the name of Rick. This character in the film attended the New York Comic Con amateurishly dressed as Worf.

Worf, voiced by Michael Dorn, makes an appearance in the animated series Family Guy.

== Books and comics ==
Worf on the cover of Star Trek: Defiant #1

Worf's character is further developed in non-canon media. In Star Trek, the non-live action material is not considered a part of the character's story, although it may use elements from the television and film narrative. In other words, live action appearances don't take into account the stories written in novels for example.

According to the Pocket Books novels set after Nemesis, Worf takes over William T. Riker's position of first officer aboard the Enterprise-E. According to Death in Winter, Worf was to transfer with Riker to the Titan, but after Data's death, Picard asks Worf to stay aboard the Enterprise, and Worf obliges. In early 2380 in Resistance, Starfleet Command approves Picard's request to make Worf the permanent first officer, but Worf refuses as he doubts his command skills (due to his choice of love over duty in "Change of Heart"). Soon afterwards, however, Worf successfully leads the rescue of Picard from another Borg crisis, and is sufficiently convinced to accept the permanent promotion. As of 2385 in the novel miniseries Star Trek: The Fall, Worf continues to remain first officer of the Enterprise-E. According to the Titan series, he also adopted Data's cat Spot.

Worf had a relationship with Enterprise-E Chief of Security Jasminder Choudhury in the books until her death in the 2012 novel The Persistence of Memory by David Mack.

The Pocket Books series continued in the 2016 trilogy Prey, written by John Jackson Miller. In it, Worf and the cloned Klingon Emperor Kahless are drawn into battle with a group of discommendated Klingons, all disciples of the late Kruge, the villain from the movie Star Trek III: The Search for Spock, being manipulated by Kruge's secret heir Korgh. By 2386, Worf's son Alexander is an Ambassador, working alongside Admiral William Riker. The events of Prey conclude with the last survivors of the discommendated Klingons taking on roles as guardians for a planet whose previous guards were killed as part of the conspiracy, with Kahless joining them to help them learn how to be truly Klingon. As acknowledgement of Worf's role in helping them redeem themselves, the group name the first child born during this crisis after Worf.

IDW Publishing took the character in a different direction in its licensed works. In the official comic book prequel to the 2009 movie Star Trek, Worf is a General in the Klingon Empire who is dispatched to deal with Romulan Captain Nero and his significantly altered mining vessel, the Narada, which leads to a confrontation in which Nero impales Worf through the back with a large mechanical tentacle. When the Enterprise-E intervenes, Nero beams Worf to Captain Data, but uses the opportunity to inflict heavy damage on the Enterprise before leaving to attack the planet Vulcan. Worf's status after this is never explicitly mentioned in the comic.

In Una McCormack's Star Trek: Picard: The Last Best Hope, a direct prequel to Star Trek: Picard, Worf is promoted to Captain of the Enterprise-E in 2381 once Picard is promoted to Admiral.

== Critical and fan reception ==
Worf is a decidedly popular character among fans. The episode "Heart of Glory" (S1E20 of TNG), which focuses on Worf and his relationship to other Klingons, is credited with planting "many seeds for successive Klingon storylines ... and new insights into Klingon culture".

With TNG over in 1995, the writers of DS9 came up with the idea of adding Worf to the cast in response to pressure to boost ratings. Screen Rant has rated the character Worf a number of times, and by several authors, at its site. Author Edward Cambro ranks Worf as the 13th best Star Trek character overall, and remarks how Worf had to "walk the line between two cultures, neither of which he entirely understood (nowhere is this more apparent than in episodes like "Sins of the Father," "Redemption II," and "Rules of Engagement")." Said cultures being Klingons and human. Then author Sara Schmidt ranks Worf the 7th most attractive person in the Star Trek universe, in between T'Pol (Enterprise) and Michael Burnham (Star Trek: Discovery), and in another article, she goes on to suggest ideas for a Worf spin-off, saying a young Worf would be "interesting to explore", as well as a "series about Worf's experiences as a Federation ambassador to Qo'noS." Dusty Stowe then ranks the top 8 most powerful characters of Star Trek and places Worf as the most powerful between Spock and Q.

== Prominent episodes ==
Some shows have a major subplot for the Worf character. The first of these debuted in 1988, "Heart of Glory" (which was S1E20 of The Next Generation) This kicked off a long-running story arc that continued until the end of DS9 in 1999 on television and 2002 on film.

In the 2012 book Star Trek 101: A Practical Guide to Who, What, Where, and Why by Terry J. Erdmann, they felt "The Way of the Warrior" was one of three key episodes for the character Worf, along with "The Sword of Khaless" and "Sons of Mogh".

TNG:

- "Heart of Glory" (S1E20) (introduction to modern Klingon Empire)
- "The Emissary" (S2E20) (introduces Worf's former lover K'Ehleyr)
- "Sins of the Father" (S3E17) (introduces Worf's brother Kurn)
- "Family" (S4E2) (the end of the Best of Both World's "trilogy" and introduces Worf's human parents)
- "Reunion" (S4E7) (introduces Worf's son Alexander)
- "Redemption" (S4-S5 cliffhanger and bridge, two parts)
- "Cost of Living" (S5E20) (major Alexander sub-plot)
- "New Ground" (S5E10) (Worf's son Alexander comes to the Enterprise-D, Worf struggles)
- "Ethics" (S5E16) (Worf suffers a broken back)
- "Birthright" (S6E16 and S6E17, two-part episode with significant Worf storyline)
- "Rightful Heir" (S6E23) (debut of the clone of Kahless)
- "Parallels" (S7E11) (major Worf focused episode, shuttle hits anomaly)
- "Firstborn" (S7E21) (Worf and Alexander encounter another Klingon)

DS9:

- "The Way of the Warrior" (S4E1, Worf sends his son to foster care and comes aboard Deep Space 9)
- "The Sword of Kahless" (S4E9, Worf looks for an ancient Klingon bat'leth)
- "Sons of Mogh" (S4E15) (Kurn is brain wiped)
- "Looking for par'Mach in All the Wrong Places" (S5E3) (the beginning of Worf's relationship with Jadzia Dax)
- "Let He Who Is Without Sin..." (S5E7) (Worf goes to Risa)
- "Soldiers of the Empire" (S5E21) (Worf joins the house of Martok)
- "Sons and Daughters (S6E3) (Reconciliation with adult Alexander)
- "You Are Cordially Invited" (S6E7) (Worf marries Dax)
- "Change of Heart" (S6E16) (Worf goes on a dangerous mission in the Dominion War)
- "Tacking into the Wind" (S7E22) (Worf installs Martok as the Klingon Chancellor)
- "What You Leave Behind" (S7E25-26, this was the two-part finale of DS9)
