= Star Trek: The Next Generation season 5 =

1991–92 season of American television series

Star Trek: The Next Generation
- Season 5
- Region A/1 Blu-ray cover art
- No. of episodes: 26

Release
- Original network: Broadcast syndication
- Original release: September 23, 1991 – June 15, 1992

Season chronology
- ← Previous; Season 4 Next → Season 6

The fifth season of the American science fiction television series Star Trek: The Next Generation commenced airing in broadcast syndication in the United States on September 23, 1991, and concluded on June 15, 1992, after airing 26 episodes. Set in the 24th century, the series follows the adventures of the crew of the Starfleet starship Enterprise-D.

The premiere episode resolves the cliffhanger from the previous season, revealing the mysterious Romulan commander to be the daughter of the Lt. Tasha Yar from the alternate universe created in the third season episode "Yesterday's Enterprise".

This season sees Picard have some of the more memorable experiences of the series, such as learning to communicate with the heretofore unintelligible Tamarians ("Darmok"), overcoming his dislike of children when he is trapped along with three children after the Enterprise-D is struck by a quantum filament ("Disaster"), and meeting with Ambassador Spock on Romulus in "Unification". Most notably, in "The Inner Light", he experiences 40 or so years of life as an iron weaver on an extinct alien world after an encounter with a probe launched before the destruction of that world.

Michelle Forbes joined the cast as Ensign Ro Laren, a Bajoran officer who was initially conceived to be one of the main characters in the upcoming spin-off Deep Space Nine. Wesley also makes a few appearances in this season when he saves the Enterprise from an alien game which was actually a mind-control device ("The Game"), and later at Starfleet Academy when he participates in a coverup of the circumstances surrounding the death of one of his classmates ("The First Duty").

The season ends with the discovery of Data's head in a cave under San Francisco which had been sealed for 500 years, and eventually with Data, Picard, La Forge, Troi, Riker and Doctor Crusher trapped in 19th century Earth ("Time's Arrow").

The logo as seen in the opening credits has a minor change this season only, as it has rear shadows. During production of this season, Star Trek creator Gene Roddenberry died of cardiac arrest. Production on the episode "Hero Worship", directed by Patrick Stewart, was halted when news reached the set.

== Cast ==
- Patrick Stewart as Captain Jean-Luc Picard
- Jonathan Frakes as Commander William T. Riker
- Brent Spiner as Lt. Cmdr. Data
- Gates McFadden as Dr. (Cmdr.) Beverly Crusher
- LeVar Burton as Lt. Cmdr. Geordi La Forge
- Marina Sirtis as Counselor (Lt. Cmdr.) Deanna Troi
- Michael Dorn as Lt. Worf

== Recurring characters ==
- Majel Barrett – Computer voice (7 episodes)/Lwaxana Troi (1 episode)
- Michelle Forbes – Ensign Ro Laren (6 episodes)
- Patti Yasutake – Ensign Alyssa Ogawa (5 episodes)
- Colm Meaney – Transporter Chief (Lt.) Miles O'Brien (4 episodes)
- Sheila Franklin – Felton (4 episodes)
- Brian Bonsall – Alexander Rozhenko (4 episodes)
- Whoopi Goldberg – Guinan (4 episodes)
- Rosalind Chao – Keiko O'Brien (3 episodes)
- Denise Crosby – Commander Sela (3 episodes)
- Wil Wheaton – Wesley Crusher (2 episodes)
- Ashley Judd – Ensign Robin Lefler (2 episodes)
- Leonard Nimoy – Ambassador Spock (2 episodes)

== Episodes ==
In the following table, episodes are listed by the order in which they aired.

No. overall	No. in season	Title	Directed by	Written by	Original release date	Prod. code	Nielsen rating
101	1	"Redemption, Part II"	David Carson	Ronald D. Moore	September 23, 1991	201	Unknown
The Klingon Civil War comes to a conclusion.
102	2	"Darmok"	Winrich Kolbe	Story by : Philip LaZebnik and Joe Menosky; Teleplay by : Joe Menosky	September 30, 1991	202	Unknown
Picard must learn to communicate with an alien captain who speaks in metaphors before a dangerous beast kills them both. Guest star Paul Winfield as Dathon.
103	3	"Ensign Ro"	Les Landau	Story by : Rick Berman & Michael Piller; Teleplay by : Michael Piller	October 7, 1991	203	11.6
After an attack on a Federation outpost, Picard is sent to locate a Bajoran terrorist with the help of Ensign Ro Laren.
104	4	"Silicon Avatar"	Cliff Bole	Story by : Lawrence V. Conley; Teleplay by : Jeri Taylor	October 14, 1991	204	12.0
With the help of a scientist whose son lived on Data's homeworld, the crew attempt to communicate with the Crystalline Entity.
105	5	"Disaster"	Gabrielle Beaumont	Story by : Ron Jarvis & Philip A. Scorza; Teleplay by : Ronald D. Moore	October 21, 1991	205	12.3
The Enterprise is heavily damaged after being hit by a space anomaly, trapping Picard in a turbolift with three children and others in various locations. Command of the bridge falls to Counselor Troi who feels ill-prepared, more so when the threat of a warp core breach endangers the Enterprise.
106	6	"The Game"	Corey Allen	Story by : Susan Sackett & Fred Bronson and Brannon Braga; Teleplay by : Brannon Braga	October 28, 1991	206	13.4
Wesley visits the Enterprise and finds the crew addicted to a mind-altering computer game. Guest star Ashley Judd as Robin Lefler.
107	7	"Unification, Part I"	Les Landau	Story by : Rick Berman & Michael Piller; Teleplay by : Jeri Taylor	November 4, 1991	208	15.4
Spock is reported to have defected to the Romulans. Picard and Data travel to Romulus in a cloaked Klingon vessel to investigate.
108	8	"Unification, Part II"	Cliff Bole	Story by : Rick Berman & Michael Piller; Teleplay by : Michael Piller	November 11, 1991	207	15.4
Spock attempts to unify the Vulcans and Romulans in peace but falls into a Romulan trap.
109	9	"A Matter of Time"	Paul Lynch	Rick Berman	November 18, 1991	209	13.9
An apparent historian from the 26th century visits the Enterprise while they help a planet prevent a nuclear winter. Guest star Matt Frewer as Berlinghoff Rasmussen.
110	10	"New Ground"	Robert Scheerer	Story by : Sara Charno & Stuart Charno; Teleplay by : Grant Rosenberg	December 30, 1991	210	11.9
Worf tries to be a father to his son, Alexander, while the Enterprise helps to test a new propulsion technology.
111	11	"Hero Worship"	Patrick Stewart	Story by : Hilary J. Bader; Teleplay by : Joe Menosky	January 6, 1992	211	12.7
Data saves the life of an orphaned boy who begins to emulate him.
112	12	"Violations"	Robert Wiemer	Story by : Shari Goodhartz & T. Michael and Pamela Gray; Teleplay by : Pamela Gray & Jeri Taylor	January 27, 1992	212	12.1
A telepathic alien traveling aboard the Enterprise telepathically assaults Troi and invades the minds of Beverly Crusher and William Riker.
113	13	"The Masterpiece Society"	Winrich Kolbe	Story by : James Kahn and Adam Belanoff; Teleplay by : Adam Belanoff and Michael Piller	February 3, 1992	213	12.0
The Enterprise helps a far-flung eugenic human colony avoid destruction but upsets its delicate balance by ending 200 years of isolation.
114	14	"Conundrum"	Les Landau	Story by : Paul Schiffer; Teleplay by : Barry Schkolnick	February 10, 1992	214	12.2
The crew's memories are mysteriously erased. They soon discover that they are being manipulated into taking part in a war.
115	15	"Power Play"	David Livingston	Story by : Paul Ruben and Maurice Hurley; Teleplay by : René Balcer and Herbert Wright & Brannon Braga	February 17, 1992	215	13.2
Troi, O'Brien, and Data are possessed by entities who want control of the ship.
116	16	"Ethics"	Chip Chalmers	Story by : Sara Charno & Stuart Charno; Teleplay by : Ronald D. Moore	February 24, 1992	216	12.6
Worf becomes paralyzed, possibly for life, and asks Riker to assist him in the Hegh'bat ceremony, a Klingon suicide ritual. Dr. Crusher consults a risk-taking researcher to save his life.
117	17	"The Outcast"	Robert Scheerer	Jeri Taylor	March 16, 1992	217	12.3
Riker falls in love with an androgynous alien during their efforts to rescue others of the same race who were trapped in "null space".
118	18	"Cause and Effect"	Jonathan Frakes	Brannon Braga	March 23, 1992	218	13.0
The Enterprise becomes stuck in a time loop but the crew retain some memory of previous instances. Guest star Kelsey Grammer as Morgan Bateson.
119	19	"The First Duty"	Paul Lynch	Ronald D. Moore & Naren Shankar	March 30, 1992	219	12.1
Wesley is questioned over a Starfleet Academy flight training accident. Guest star Ray Walston as Boothby.
120	20	"Cost of Living"	Winrich Kolbe	Peter Allan Fields	April 20, 1992	220	11.7
Deanna's mother, Lwaxana, arrives to marry a man she has never met. Worf has difficulty rearing Alexander, which is exacerbated when Lwaxana takes the boy under her wing.
121	21	"The Perfect Mate"	Cliff Bole	Story by : René Echevarria and Gary Perconte; Teleplay by : Gary Perconte and Michael Piller	April 27, 1992	221	10.8
Picard forces himself to resist the charms of a female empathic metamorph who is sent to marry an alien leader as a peace offering. Guest star Famke Janssen as Kamala.
122	22	"Imaginary Friend"	Gabrielle Beaumont	Story by : Jean Louise Matthias & Ronald Wilkerson and Richard Fliegel; Teleplay by : Edithe Swensen and Brannon Braga	May 4, 1992	222	12.1
A child's imaginary playmate takes on a physical form and threatens the well-being of the Enterprise.
123	23	"I, Borg"	Robert Lederman	René Echevarria	May 11, 1992	223	12.8
The Enterprise rescues a Borg survivor, whom Geordi names 'Hugh'. Picard plans to upload a destructive computer virus to Hugh so the virus will spread throughout the collective when Hugh is sent back.
124	24	"The Next Phase"	David Carson	Ronald D. Moore	May 18, 1992	224	11.7
A transporter accident traps Geordi and Ensign Ro out of phase with normal space. While the others plan their funeral, Geordi and Ro must find a way to reverse the process and save the Enterprise from destruction.
125	25	"The Inner Light"	Peter Lauritson	Story by : Morgan Gendel; Teleplay by : Morgan Gendel and Peter Allan Fields	June 1, 1992	225	11.1
A space probe creates a telepathic tether to Picard and causes him to experience, in twenty-five minutes, a lifetime as a married man on a world that was destroyed a millennium ago.
126	26	"Time's Arrow, Part I"	Les Landau	Story by : Joe Menosky; Teleplay by : Joe Menosky & Michael Piller	June 15, 1992	226	11.8
A 500-year-old artifact is uncovered on Earth: Data's severed head. The Enterprise investigates alien involvement in Earth's past and Data fulfills his destiny.

== Reception ==
In 2019, CBR rated Season 5 of Star Trek: The Next Generation as the third best season of all Star Trek seasons up to that time, and the most highly ranked season of Star Trek: The Next Generation.
