= Darmok =

- Star Trek: The Next Generation episode
- Episode no.: Season 5 Episode 2
- Directed by: Winrich Kolbe
- Story by: Joe Menosky; Phillip LaZebnik
- Teleplay by: Joe Menosky
- Cinematography by: Marvin Rush
- Production code: 202
- Original air date: September 30, 1991

Guest appearances
- Richard Allen – Tamarian First Officer; Colm Meaney – Miles O'Brien; Paul Winfield – Dathon; Ashley Judd – Robin Lefler; Majel Barrett – Computer Voice

Episode chronology
← Previous "Redemption II"	Next → "Ensign Ro"
- Star Trek: The Next Generation season 5

"Darmok" is the 102nd episode of the American science fiction television series Star Trek: The Next Generation, the second episode of the fifth season.

Set in the 24th century, the series follows the adventures of the Starfleet crew of the Federation starship Enterprise-D. In this episode, the crew of the Enterprise is unable to establish meaningful communication with the crew of an alien vessel, which is resolved by the struggle of the ships' captains to defend each other from a vicious beast. It is sometimes cited as one of the best episodes of both The Next Generation series and the entire family of Star Trek television series.

The alien species introduced in this episode is noted for speaking in allegories, such as "Temba, his arms wide", which are indecipherable to the universal translator normally used in the television series to allow communication across different languages. Captain Picard is abducted by these aliens and marooned with one of them on the surface of a planet, and must try to communicate.

== Plot ==
The Enterprise makes contact with a Tamarian ship in orbit around the planet El-Adrel. The Tamarians had been previously contacted by the Federation, but could not be understood – although the universal translator can translate their words, the order and structure in which they use them were judged as "incomprehensible". Likewise, the Tamarians cannot understand Captain Picard's use of language.

The Tamarian captain, Dathon, has himself and Picard transported to the planet's surface. The Tamarians then cast a scattering field that blocks further transporter use. Dathon utters the phrase "Darmok and Jalad at Tanagra" and tosses Picard a dagger; Picard mistakes Dathon's intentions, believing he wants a fight to the death. The next morning, Dathon comes running and Picard realizes there is a hostile predator in the area. Picard begins to understand the Tamarians' jargon when he recognizes one expression as a tactic to fight the beast. Picard finally realises that Tamarians speak in allegories. The two attempt to battle the beast together, but the Enterprise's unsuccessful attempt to beam up Picard prevents him from participating at a crucial moment. Dathon is severely wounded.

On the Enterprise, First Officer Riker and the crew struggle to understand the aliens' language. Although they now understand how the aliens speak, communication is still impossible as they know nothing of the Tamarians' mythohistorical references. They make several efforts to rescue the Captain, all foiled by the Tamarians. While tending to Dathon's wounds, Picard slowly deduces that Darmok and Jalad were warriors who met on the island of Tanagra and were forced to unite against a dangerous beast there, becoming friends in the process. Dathon tried to recreate this event with Picard, hoping to forge a friendship through shared adversity. Picard recounts for Dathon the Epic of Gilgamesh, a story that parallels the allegory of Darmok and Jalad. Dathon listens gladly, eventually succumbing to his injuries.

The Enterprise fires on the Tamarian ship, disabling the scattering field, and beams up Picard. A battle begins, but just when destruction of the Enterprise seems imminent, Picard enters the bridge and uses his newfound knowledge to communicate with the Tamarians, who are overjoyed at the development. Picard offers them Dathon's diary and dagger after telling them of their captain's sacrifice. The Tamarians tell him to keep the dagger in remembrance of Dathon, and record the event as "Picard and Dathon at El-Adrel" — a new phrase in their language.

Picard later reads the Homeric Hymns, explaining to Riker that studying their own mythology may help them relate to the Tamarians. He mourns that Dathon sacrificed himself in the hope of communication, and wonders if he would have done the same.

== Production ==
This episode had the longest gestation period of any episode of TNG during Michael Piller's tenure, taking around two years to make it to the screen. Rick Berman hated the premise, but Piller thought it was interesting and was determined to make it work. Piller gave it to writer Joe Menosky, who completed the script and focused the story on the idea of two leaders attempting to communicate, as well as using the Epic of Gilgamesh as a plot device.

Primary filming for "Darmok" occurred July 18−26, 1991, on Paramount Stages 8, 9 and 16, as well as on location at Bronson Canyon. An additional day was August 8 for the blue screen unit to film the creature scenes with stuntman Rex Pierson on Paramount Stage 9. Second unit for this episode filmed on August 26 on Paramount Stages 9 and 16. When production for the following episode, "Ensign Ro", returned to location at Bronson Canyon on August 5, another sequence was filmed for "Darmok" involving Pierson and photo doubles Ron Large and Lanier Edwards. Photo double Dana Vitatoe filmed additional second unit shots on August 28 on Paramount Stage 9.

=== Casting ===
The episode features Paul Winfield as Dathon, who previously played Captain Terrell in Star Trek II: The Wrath of Khan, and Ashley Judd in her debut acting performance. The call sheet dated on July 18 featured an "uncast actress" in the role of Lt. Larson; in the final episode, this role became Robin Lefler, who was played by Judd. She later reprised this character in "The Game".

== In other media ==
A Tamarian appears in Star Trek: Lower Decks as a regular character featured as a crew member of the USS Cerritos, Lt. Kayshon (voiced by Carl Tart). Kayshon is shown learning and using Federation Standard as well as the Tamarian language.

== Tamarian use of language ==
The Tamarian language and its societal implications, as portrayed in the episode, have received considerable attention, both from fans of the series and also in mainstream media.

Most Star Trek plots used a universal translator to avoid language issues, but it failed here, providing conflict. The episode describes a language built upon metaphors and allegories, in which Tamarians cite incidents from their cultural history, to communicate the emotions they feel, their perceptions of situations, and their wishes and opinions about actions. For example, the Tamarian captain Dathon uses the expression "Temba, his arms wide", to indicate his intent to give an item to Picard, and his motive of generosity and friendly helpfulness, by referencing an event in Tamarian history involving a Tamarian, Temba. Similarly, the expressions "Darmok on the ocean, Darmok and Jalad at Tanagra, Darmok and Jalad on the ocean", convey a sense of two opposing persons, who arrive separately at an isolated place and, forced to cooperate when faced with a fierce beast, leave together as friends. The expression conveys his intentions and purpose in requiring his crew to transport Picard and himself to the planet (where there is also a dangerous creature), and isolate them there together. At the end of the episode, his diary is read by his crew, and a new piece of language emerges: "Picard and Dathon at El-Adrel".

In examining this structure as a language basis, Ian Bogost wrote in The Atlantic that the language had been criticized as unsuited to technical dialogue of an advanced space-faring race ("hand me the ¾-inch socket wrench"), or as metaphor or imagery. In his analysis, "something much stranger" is depicted, since the language as depicted is described as "imagery", "metaphor", or "symbolic", and it seems to prevent any distinction between an object (or event) and its figurative representation.

Bogost suggests allegory as a better term, because in allegory, events are replaced by others instead of just referring to other events. Noting that 20th century philosopher Walter Benjamin criticized this use of allegory as flawed and harmful (it replaces real concerns by a fetishized kind of mythology), he then commented that the answer to these points was to be found elsewhere. In Bogost's view, the Tamarian language portrayed is neither imagery nor allegory, although it can take these roles. Its deeper structure is an abstraction, a form of logic. There is no need to ask explicitly for a socket wrench, because the reference suggests what should be done, as well as how those involved should organize and execute the tasks involved. He suggests that the better term to describe this language is that it instantiates strategy and logic, and all concerned can then perceive how to follow it with a shared understanding. He comments that in this sense, the term "Sim City" would represent and evoke an entire process and strategy for creating the simulations within that game, and that:

"If we pretend that 'Shaka, when the walls fell' is a signifier, then its signified is not the fictional mythological character Shaka, nor the myth that contains whatever calamity caused the walls to fall, but the logic by which the situation itself came about. Tamarian language isn’t really language at all, but machinery."

The Tamarians' language has been compared to the modern use of Internet memes and image macros.

In the paper Darmok and Jalad on the Internet, Kristina Šekrst compares the Tamarian language to Lakoff's and Mark Johnson's theory of metaphors from Metaphors We Live By and Women, Fire, and Dangerous Things. It explores how the language illustrates the role of metaphor and metonymy in communication, which was a recent concept in cognitive linguistics. It also explains that metaphors are a challenge in natural language processing, and the lack of information about the language caused the universal translator to fail in much the same way as modern computational translators fail to translate metaphors without sufficient knowledge about the source language.

The book "Hailing Frequencies Open": Communication in Star Trek: The Next Generation by Thomas D. Parham, III says that in "Darmok", the episode focused on epistemology by using interpersonal interactions. They found that several other episodes in the series used interpersonal interactions to explore concepts.

Tamarian language was compared to the difficulty of communicating with an autistic 19-year-old patient by Elizabeth Kim et al.

A machine-learning translation by Peter Jansen was employed for English-to-Tamarian translation, assembling a Tamarian-English dictionary of utterances from the original episode and several follow-on novels, as well as an automatic translation system for this language pair.

== Reception ==
Zack Handlen of The A.V. Club gave it a grade "A", and although he finds the core concept improbable he says "the episode is carried by terrific performances, particularly Stewart and Winfield". In his 2012 rewatch, Keith DeCandido of Tor.com rated the episode nine out of ten.

The 1999 book The Music of Star Trek describes composer Jay Chattaway's score as offering "memorable dramatic support" to "Darmok" and other episodes he had worked on.

"Darmok" is generally regarded as one of the greatest episodes of Star Trek, as well as one of Patrick Stewart's best performances as Captain Picard. In 2016, The Washington Post ranked "Darmok" the second best episode of all Star Trek television. Io9 ranked it as the fifth best episode of all Star Trek in 2011, and again in 2014. In 2016, Empire ranked it sixth of all Star Trek episodes. In 2016, Vox list this as one of the top 25 essential episodes of all Star Trek. In 2019, The Hollywood Reporter listed "Darmok" among the twenty-five best episodes of Star Trek: The Next Generation.

In 2013, The Guardian recommended this episode as one of six "examples of a smarter version of Star Trek", out of all the episodes of the franchise up to that time. They remarked it was a "beautifully executed episode".

In 2014, Ars Technica triggered an online controversy when one staff member said it was a "bad episode"; in the ensuing discussion they noted that overall it is considered not just a good episode, but a great one.

In 2015, Geek.com rated "Darmok" as the fifth greatest moment in Star Trek.

In 2016, IGN ranked "Darmok" the 19th best episode of all Star Trek series. They call this one of "Picard's finest hours" as he tries to communicate with an alien that despite understanding the words (see universal translator), does not understand the meaning. They are stranded together on an alien planet while threatened, and Picard eventually figures out they are speaking in metaphors. A communication breakthrough comes when he relates their situation to the alien's description "Darmok and Jalad – at Tanagra."

In 2016, Radio Times ranked the interaction between Picard and Dathon in Star Trek, as the 20th best moment in all Star Trek.

In 2017, Screen Rant ranked "Darmok" as the third most optimistic and hopeful episode of all Star Trek episodes up to that time. They also ranked the Tamarians, the alien species featured in this episode, as the fifth most bizarre aliens of Star Trek. They remark that Starfleet has difficulty in communicating with them due to a failure of their technology, the universal translator.

In 2017, Nerdist ranked "Darmok" the fifth best episode of Star Trek: The Next Generation.

In 2017, Den of Geek ranked this episode as one of the top 25 "must watch" episodes of Star Trek: The Next Generation. They also listed it as one of the top ten ground-breaking episodes of this series. They note how Picard must overcome the failure of the universal translator technology to communicate with an alien culture. They note how these aliens communicate using stories.

In 2018, Tom's Guide rated "Darmok" one of the 15 best episodes featuring Picard.

In 2018, Entertainment Weekly ranked "Darmok" as one of the top ten moments of Picard. In 2018, Popular Mechanics highlighted "Darmok" as one of the twelve best Picard episodes, and as recommended viewing for audiences to prepare for a new television series based on that character, Star Trek: Picard.

In 2020, Primetimer ranked this one of the top ten episodes for Picard.

In 2020, Screen Rant ranked "Darmok" the third best episode of the series, noting its unique but great take on contact between alien cultures as Picard must contend with failure of Star Trek's universal translator technology. They point out the episode features a "harrowing" confrontation, that features some tense situations as they struggle to communicate.

In 2020, The Digital Fix said this was the seventh best episode of Star Trek: The Next Generation.

In 2021, Cinemablend ranked this one of the top ten episodes of TNG.

A character introduced in this episode, Robin Lefler (played by Ashley Judd), was ranked as the 71st most important character of Starfleet within the Star Trek science fiction universe. TV Guide listed Judd's acting role as Ensign Robin Lefler as one of 28 surprising guest acting roles on Star Trek, noting that she appears in this episode "Darmok" and also in "The Game". The future romance between Robin and Wesley's character is also noted. In 2021, Robert Vaux writing for CBR, said that Paul Winfield was a "terrific" co-star for Stewart, and highlighted this episode among a trio of season five episodes (along with "The Perfect Mate" and "The Inner Light") that he really shined in.

== Releases ==
The episode was later released in the United States on November 5, 2002, as part of the Season 5 DVD box set. The first Blu-ray release was in the United States on November 18, 2013, followed by the United Kingdom the next day.

== See also ==
- Ascian language
- Utamakura – Rhetorical concept in Japanese poetry
