= Violations (Star Trek: The Next Generation) =

- Star Trek: The Next Generation episode
- Enterprise crew members discuss the telepathic abilities of the Ullians.
- Episode no.: Season 5 Episode 12
- Directed by: Robert Wiemer
- Story by: Shari Goodhartz; T Michael; Pamela Gray
- Teleplay by: Pamela Gray; Jeri Taylor
- Production code: 212
- Original air date: February 3, 1992

Guest appearances
- Rosalind Chao - Keiko O'Brien; Ben Lemon - Jev; David Sage - Tarmin; Rick Fitts - Martin; Eve Brenner - Inad; Craig Benton - Crewman Davis; Doug Wert - Jack Crusher; Majel Barrett - Computer Voice

Episode chronology
← Previous "Hero Worship"	Next → "The Masterpiece Society"
- Star Trek: The Next Generation season 5

"Violations" is the 112th episode of the American science fiction television series Star Trek: The Next Generation, the 12th episode of the fifth season.

Set in the 24th century, the series follows the adventures of the Starfleet crew of the Federation starship Enterprise-D. In this episode, a member of an alien delegation traveling on the USS Enterprise molests members of the crew using telepathy.

== Plot ==
The Federation starship Enterprise conveys a delegation of Ullians to Calder IV. Tarmin, their leader, explains that Ullians are telepathic historians who retrieve long-forgotten memories. Tarmin adds that their abilities require years of training, and his son Jev, also part of the delegation, has not yet reached his potential. Jev is upset and leaves. Counselor Deanna Troi talks to Jev, pointing out that her mother, Lwaxana Troi, is also overbearing. After Troi returns to her quarters, she recalls a romantic interlude with Commander William Riker, but as the memory becomes more intense, Riker assaults Deanna. Suddenly, Riker is replaced by Jev. Troi screams out in pain and is later found in a coma.

Riker speaks to Jev as the last person seen talking to Troi, and asks whether he would submit to medical tests to make sure the Ullians do not carry any harmful toxins or pathogens. Jev agrees, but later Riker experiences a flashback and also collapses. Dr. Crusher's scans of Troi and Riker show electropathic activity typical of a rare neurological disorder, Iresine Syndrome. Captain Picard asks the Ullians if they would allow for further scanning, which Tarmin agrees to. None of the Ullians, nor any of their volunteers, exhibit this disorder. Dr. Crusher later succumbs to a flashback, and Picard puts Lt. Commander Data and Chief Engineer Geordi La Forge in charge of the investigation. Following Dr. Crusher's research, Geordi looks to other cases of Iresine Syndrome in Federation records, eventually discovering two that occurred while a Ullian delegation was present.

Troi wakes from her coma; Jev offers to probe her mind to find out what happened. Picard allows it, and Troi recounts the memory, ending with the replacement of Riker by Tarmin. Jev asserts that for his people, forcefully inserting oneself into a memory is a crime, and contacts his homeworld to let them know of Tarmin's crime. As they near their destination, Jev comes to say goodbye to Troi, apologizing for his father. When Troi offers sympathy, Jev initiates another mind probe, causing the same memory to occur for Troi. Suddenly, security personnel arrive and take Jev into custody; Data and La Forge had discovered two additional instances of unexplained comas; Tarmin was not present when they occurred. As the Enterprise sets course for the Ullian homeworld, Riker and Dr. Crusher recover from their comas.

== Critical response ==
Zack Handlen of The A. V. Club wrote: "Violations does try to be about as creepy as it possibly can be without getting explicit, and the results are uncomfortable and not necessarily in a good way. The dream sequences that Jev, a telepath who can't keep his brain in his skull, forces on Troi, Riker, and Crusher, are effectively unsettling, and the core idea here is certainly frightening. And hey, any episode that has Geordi and Data teaming up to solve a mystery can't be all bad."
