= List of Star Trek production staff =

This is a list of people who were producers, directors, designers and other production staff on the Star Trek television series and films.

The Series column uses the following abbreviations:

- TOS – The Original Series
- PII – Phase II
- TNG – The Next Generation
- DS9 – Deep Space Nine
- VOY – Voyager
- ENT – Enterprise
- DSC – Discovery
- PIC – Picard
- LOW – Lower Decks
- PRD – Prodigy
- SNW - Strange New Worlds
- FILMS – Films

== Producers ==
Person	TOS	PII	FILMS	TNG	DS9	VOY	ENT	DSC	PIC	LOW	PRD	SNW
Ira Steven Behr	No	No	No	Yes	Yes	No	No	No	No	No	No	No
Harve Bennett	No	No	Yes	No	No	No	No	No	No	No	No	No
Rick Berman	No	No	Yes	Yes	Yes	Yes	Yes	No	No	No	No	No
Kenneth Biller	No	No	No	No	No	Yes	No	No	No	No	No	No
Brannon Braga	No	No	No	No	No	Yes	Yes	No	No	No	No	No
Gene L. Coon	Yes	No	No	No	No	No	No	No	No	No	No	No
Manny Coto	No	No	No	No	No	No	Yes	No	No	No	No	No
René Echevarria	No	No	No	No	Yes	No	No	No	No	No	No	No
Akiva Goldsman	No	No	No	No	No	No	No	Yes	Yes	No	No	Yes
Robert Goodwin	No	Yes	No	No	No	No	No	No	No	No	No	No
Kevin & Dan Hageman	No	No	No	No	No	No	No	No	No	No	Yes	No
Robert H. Justman	Yes	No	No	Yes	No	No	No	No	No	No	No	No
Heather Kadin	No	No	No	No	No	No	No	Yes	Yes	No	No	Yes
Alex Kurtzman	No	No	Yes	No	No	No	No	Yes	Yes	Yes	Yes	Yes
Peter Lauritson	No	No	No	Yes	No	Yes	No	No	No	No	No	No
Damon Lindelof	No	No	Yes	No	No	No	No	No	No	No	No	No
David Livingston	No	No	No	Yes	Yes	Yes	No	No	No	No	No	No
Harold Livingston	No	Yes	Yes	No	No	No	No	No	No	No	No	No
John Meredyth Lucas	Yes	No	No	No	No	No	No	No	No	No	No	No
Ronald D. Moore	No	No	No	Yes	Yes	Yes	No	No	No	No	No	No
Michael Piller	No	No	Yes	Yes	Yes	Yes	No	No	No	No	No	No
Judith and Garfield Reeves-Stevens	No	No	No	No	No	No	Yes	No	No	No	No	No
Gene Roddenberry	Yes	Yes	Yes	Yes	No	No	No	No	No	No	No	No
Rod Roddenberry	No	No	No	No	No	No	No	Yes	Yes	Yes	Yes	Yes
Herbert F. Solow	Yes	No	No	No	No	No	No	No	No	No	No	No
Jeri Taylor	No	No	No	Yes	No	Yes	No	No	No	No	No	No
Aaron J. Waltke	No	No	No	No	No	No	No	No	No	No	Yes	No
Ralph Winter	No	No	Yes	No	No	No	No	No	No	No	No	No
Robert Wise	No	No	Yes	No	No	No	No	No	No	No	No	No
Robert Hewitt Wolfe	No	No	No	No	Yes	No	No	No	No	No	No	No
Herbert Wright	No	No	No	Yes	No	No	No	No	No	No	No	No

== Directors ==
Person	Series
J. J. Abrams	FILM
David Alexander	TOS
Corey Allen	TNG, DS9
Reza Badiyi	DS9
Gabrielle Beaumont	TNG, DS9, VOY
Cliff Bole	TNG, DS9, VOY
LeVar Burton	TNG, DS9, VOY, ENT
Robert Butler	TOS
David Carson	TNG, DS9, FILM
Marvin Chomsky	TOS
Robert L. Collins	PII
James L. Conway	DS9, VOY, ENT
Robert Duncan McNeill	VOY, ENT
Marc Daniels	TOS
Herschel Daugherty	TOS
Roxann Dawson	VOY, ENT
Lawrence Dobkin	TOS
John Erman	TOS
Jonathan Frakes	TNG, DS9, VOY, DSC, PIC, SNW, SFA, FILM
Robert Gist	TOS
Murray Golden	TOS
James Goldstone	TOS
Harvey Hart	TOS
Robert Iscove	TNG
Winrich Kolbe	TNG, DS9, VOY, ENT
James Komack	TOS
Allan Kroeker	DS9, VOY, ENT
Les Landau	TNG, DS9, VOY, ENT
Peter Lauritson	TNG, DS9, VOY, ENT, FILM
Tony Leader	TOS
David Livingston	TNG, DS9, VOY, ENT
Russ Mayberry	TNG
John Meredyth Lucas	TOS
Don McDougall	TOS
Vincent McEveety	TOS
Nicholas Meyer	FILM
Gene Nelson	TOS
Adam Nimoy	TNG
Leonard Nimoy	FILM
Michael O'Herlihy	TOS
Gerd Oswald	TOS
Leo Penn	TOS
Joseph Pevney	TOS
Joseph Sargent	TOS
Joseph L. Scanlan	TNG
Robert Scheerer	TNG, DS9, VOY
William Shatner	FILM
Ralph Senensky	TOS
Robert Sparr	TOS
Patrick Stewart	TNG
Babu Subramaniam	TNG
Jud Taylor	TOS
Herb Wallerstein	TOS
Robert Wiemer	TNG, DS9
Robert Wise	FILM

== Other staff ==
Person	Series	Role
Peter E. Berger	FILM	Film editor
André Bormanis	TNG, DS9, VOY	Science consultant
Dan Curry	TNG, DS9, VOY, ENT	Designer
John Eaves	DS9, ENT, FILM	Designer
Franz Joseph	TOS	Designer
John Knoll	TNG, DS9, FILM	Visual effects specialist
David Milhous	ENT	Assistant editor
Marc Okrand	TNG, FILM	Language specialist
Michael Okuda	TNG, DS9, VOY, ENT, FILM	Scenic artist
Denise Okuda	TNG, DS9, VOY, ENT, FILM	Scenic artist
Neville Page	DSC, FILM	Creature designer
Andrew Probert	TNG, FILM	Ship designer
Susan Sackett	TNG	Production assistant
Nick Sagan	TNG, VOY	Story editor
Rick Sternbach	TNG, DS9, VOY, FILM	Designer
Eric A. Stillwell	TNG, VOY, FILM	Production associate
Michael Westmore	TNG, DS9, VOY, ENT, FILM	Make-up artist
Herman F. Zimmerman	TNG, DS9, ENT, FILM	Production designer

== Films ==
=== Cast ===
List indicators

This section includes characters who will appear or have appeared in the franchise.

- An empty grey cell indicates the character was not in the film, or that the character's official presence has not yet been confirmed.
- ^{O} indicates an older version of the character.
- ^{V} indicates a voice-only role.
- ^{Y} indicates a younger version of the character.

Character
Character	The Original Series						The Next Generation				Reboot (Kelvin Timeline)		
Character	TMP	TWOK	TSFS	TVH	TFF	TUC	GEN	FC	INS	NEM	ST	STID	STB
Character	1979	1982	1984	1986	1989	1991	1994	1996	1998	2002	2009	2013	2016
James Tiberius Kirk	William Shatner	William Shatner	William Shatner	William Shatner	William Shatner	William Shatner	William Shatner				Chris Pine	Chris Pine	Chris Pine (Note: Additionally, William Shatner appears as James T. Kirk in photographic form.)
James Tiberius Kirk	William Shatner	William Shatner	William Shatner	William Shatner	William Shatner	William Shatner	William Shatner				Jimmy Bennett^{Y}	Chris Pine	Chris Pine
Spock	Leonard Nimoy	Leonard Nimoy	Leonard Nimoy	Leonard Nimoy	Leonard Nimoy	Leonard Nimoy					Zachary Quinto	Zachary Quinto	Zachary Quinto (Note: Additionally, Leonard Nimoy appears as Spock in photographic form.)
Spock	Leonard Nimoy	Leonard Nimoy	Leonard Nimoy	Leonard Nimoy	Leonard Nimoy	Leonard Nimoy					Leonard Nimoy^{O}	Leonard Nimoy^{O}	Zachary Quinto
Spock	Leonard Nimoy	Leonard Nimoy	Leonard Nimoy	Leonard Nimoy	Leonard Nimoy	Leonard Nimoy					Jacob Kogan^{Y}	Leonard Nimoy^{O}	Zachary Quinto
Leonard McCoy	DeForest Kelley	DeForest Kelley	DeForest Kelley	DeForest Kelley	DeForest Kelley	DeForest Kelley					Karl Urban	Karl Urban	Karl Urban (Note: Additionally, DeForest Kelley appears as Leonard McCoy in photographic form.)
Montgomery Scott	James Doohan	James Doohan	James Doohan	James Doohan	James Doohan	James Doohan	James Doohan				Simon Pegg	Simon Pegg	Simon Pegg (Note: Additionally, James Doohan appears as Montgomery Scott in photographic form.)
Hikaru Sulu	George Takei	George Takei	George Takei	George Takei	George Takei	George Takei					John Cho	John Cho	John Cho (Note: Additionally, George Takei appears as Hikaru Sulu in photographic form.)
Nyota Uhura	Nichelle Nichols	Nichelle Nichols	Nichelle Nichols	Nichelle Nichols	Nichelle Nichols	Nichelle Nichols					Zoe Saldaña	Zoe Saldaña	Zoe Saldaña (Note: Additionally, Nichelle Nichols appears as Nyota Uhura in photographic form.)
Pavel Chekov	Walter Koenig	Walter Koenig	Walter Koenig	Walter Koenig	Walter Koenig	Walter Koenig	Walter Koenig				Anton Yelchin	Anton Yelchin	Anton Yelchin (Note: Additionally, Walter Koenig appears as Pavel Chekov in photographic form.)
Sarek			Mark Lenard	Mark Lenard	Jonathan Simpson	Mark Lenard					Ben Cross		
Sarek			Mark Lenard	Mark Lenard	Mark Lenard^{V}	Mark Lenard					Ben Cross		
Janice Rand	Grace Lee Whitney		Grace Lee Whitney	Grace Lee Whitney		Grace Lee Whitney							
Christine Chapel	Majel Barrett			Majel Barrett									
Amanda Grayson				Jane Wyatt	Cynthia Blaise						Winona Ryder		
Khan Noonien Singh		Ricardo Montalbán										Benedict Cumberbatch	
Carol Marcus		Bibi Besch										Alice Eve	
Saavik		Kirstie Alley	Robin Curtis	Robin Curtis									
David Marcus		Merritt Butrick	Merritt Butrick										
Cartwright				Brock Peters		Brock Peters							
Klingon Ambassador				John Schuck		John Schuck							
Jean-Luc Picard							Patrick Stewart	Patrick Stewart	Patrick Stewart	Patrick Stewart			
Beverly Crusher							Gates McFadden	Gates McFadden	Gates McFadden	Gates McFadden			
Data							Brent Spiner	Brent Spiner	Brent Spiner	Brent Spiner			
Geordi La Forge							LeVar Burton	LeVar Burton	LeVar Burton	LeVar Burton			
William Riker							Jonathan Frakes	Jonathan Frakes	Jonathan Frakes	Jonathan Frakes			
Deanna Troi							Marina Sirtis	Marina Sirtis	Marina Sirtis	Marina Sirtis			
Worf							Michael Dorn	Michael Dorn	Michael Dorn	Michael Dorn			
Guinan							Whoopi Goldberg			Whoopi Goldberg			
Demora Sulu							Jacqueline Kim						Rihanne Quionn
Alyssa Ogawa							Patti Yasutake	Patti Yasutake					
Keenser											Deep Roy	Deep Roy	Deep Roy
Christopher Pike											Bruce Greenwood	Bruce Greenwood	
George Kirk											Chris Hemsworth	Chris Hemsworth^{V}	
Winona Kirk											Jennifer Morrison	Jennifer Morrison^{V}	

=== Crew ===
Crew/detail	Film												
Crew/detail	The Motion Picture	II The Wrath of Khan	III The Search for Spock	IV The Voyage Home	V The Final Frontier	VI The Undiscovered Country	Generations	First Contact	Insurrection	Nemesis	Star Trek	Into Darkness	Beyond
Crew/detail	1979	1982	1984	1986	1989	1991	1994	1996	1998	2002	2009	2013	2016
Director(s)	Robert Wise	Nicholas Meyer	Leonard Nimoy	Leonard Nimoy	William Shatner	Nicholas Meyer	David Carson	Jonathan Frakes	Jonathan Frakes	Stuart Baird	J. J. Abrams	J. J. Abrams	Justin Lin
Producer(s)	Gene Roddenberry	Robert Sallin	Harve Bennett	Harve Bennett	Harve Bennett	Ralph Winter, Steven-Charles Jaffe	Rick Berman	Rick Berman	Rick Berman	Rick Berman	J. J. Abrams, Damon Lindelof	J. J. Abrams, Bryan Burk, Damon Lindelof, Alex Kurtzman, Roberto Orci	J. J. Abrams, Roberto Orci, Lindsey Weber, Justin Lin
Composer(s)	Jerry Goldsmith	James Horner	James Horner	Leonard Rosenman	Jerry Goldsmith	Cliff Eidelman	Dennis McCarthy	Jerry Goldsmith, Joel Goldsmith (additional music)	Jerry Goldsmith	Jerry Goldsmith	Michael Giacchino	Michael Giacchino	Michael Giacchino
Writer(s)	Screenplay: Harold Livingston; Story by: Alan Dean Foster	Screenplay: Jack B. Sowards, Nicholas Meyer (uncredited); Story by: Harve Bennett, Jack B. Sowards; Nicholas Meyer (uncredited), Samuel A. Peeples (uncredited)	Harve Bennett	Screenplay: Steve Meerson, Peter Krikes, Nicholas Meyer, Harve Bennett; Story by: Harve Bennett, Leonard Nimoy	Screenplay: David Loughery; Story by: William Shatner, Harve Bennett, David Loughery	Screenplay: Nicholas Meyer, Denny Martin Flinn; Story by: Leonard Nimoy, Lawrence Konner, Mark Rosenthal	Screenplay: Ronald D. Moore, Brannon Braga; Story by: Rick Berman, Ronald D. Moore, Brannon Braga	Screenplay: Brannon Braga, Ronald D. Moore; Story by: Rick Berman, Brannon Braga, Ronald D. Moore	Screenplay: Michael Piller; Story by: Rick Berman, Michael Piller	Screenplay: John Logan; Story by: John Logan, Rick Berman, Brent Spiner	Roberto Orci, Alex Kurtzman	Roberto Orci, Alex Kurtzman, Damon Lindelof	Simon Pegg, Doug Jung
Running time	132 minutes	113 minutes	105 minutes	119 minutes	106 minutes	110 minutes	118 minutes	111 minutes	103 minutes	116 minutes	126 minutes	132 minutes	122 minutes

== See also ==
- List of Star Trek composers and music
