= Unification (Star Trek: The Next Generation) =

- Star Trek: The Next Generation episodes
- Picard and Data with Spock on Romulus
- Episode nos.: Season 5 Episodes 7 and 8
- Directed by: Les Landau (Part I); Cliff Bole (Part II)
- Story by: Rick Berman; Michael Piller
- Teleplay by: Jeri Taylor (Part I); Michael Piller (Part II)
- Production codes: 208 and 207
- Original air dates: November 4, 1991; November 11, 1991

Guest appearances
- Leonard Nimoy - Spock; Malachi Throne - Pardek; Stephen Root - K'Vada; Daniel Roebuck - Romulan civilian; Norman Large - Neral; Joanna Miles - Perrin; Mark Lenard - Sarek; Graham Jarvis - Klim Dokachin; Erick Avari - B'iJik; Mimi Cozzens - Soup Woman; Karen Hensel - Brackett; Majel Barrett - Computer Voice; Denise Crosby - Sela; William Bastiani - Omag; Susan Fallender - Romulan Woman; Vidal Peterson - D'Tan; Harriet Leider - Amarie

Episode chronology
← Previous "The Game"	Next → "A Matter of Time"
- Star Trek: The Next Generation season 5

"Unification" is a two-part episode of the syndicated American science fiction television series Star Trek: The Next Generation. The episodes feature a guest appearance by Leonard Nimoy as Spock, reprising his role from the 1960s Star Trek series. The first of the two episodes earned a 15.4 household Nielsen rating, drawing over 25 million viewers, making it one of the most watched episodes in all seven seasons of The Next Generation's run.

Set in the 24th century, The Next Generation follows the adventures of the Starfleet crew of the Federation starship Enterprise-D. In this episode, Captain Picard goes on a mission to find Spock, now a decorated ambassador, after learning that he may have defected to the Romulan Empire, an enemy of the United Federation of Planets. This episode was praised for the "novelty and nostalgia" of seeing Spock, and noted for introducing a peace-loving Romulan faction. Story elements and appearances by Spock from the episode are included in "Unification III" in Star Trek Discovery.

== Plot ==
=== Part I ===
Starfleet Admiral Brackett informs Captain Picard (Patrick Stewart) that Ambassador Spock (Leonard Nimoy) has been photographed on Romulus, raising fears that he may have defected. With the threat to Federation security incalculable, Picard is ordered to find out what happened. He orders the Enterprise to Vulcan to speak to Spock's ailing father, Sarek (Mark Lenard), with whom Picard shares a close bond, due to their mind meld that helped Sarak complete his final mission. Sarek, to whom Spock was estranged due to their differing views during the war with the Cardassians, is certain Spock would never defect and mentions Pardek, a Romulan Senator with whom Spock has been maintaining a dialogue for several decades. Before Picard leaves, Sarek talks about how even though he and Spock often argued he was secretly proud of his son for always standing his ground. Lieutenant Commander Data (Brent Spiner) discovers a visual record of Pardek from a trade conference and confirms that he appears by Spock's side in the photograph. The Enterprise crew find the remains of a decommissioned Vulcan ship, the T'Pau, in the debris of a crashed Ferengi ship.

Picard calls in a favor from Gowron, the Chancellor of the Klingon Empire. At first, Gowron ignores the Enterprise's hails, however, when Picard tells B'iJik (The Klingon that answers in place of Gowron) to tell Gowron that the Arbiter of his Ascension is requesting a favor, Gowron reluctantly agrees to aid Picard. A Klingon ship is assigned to carry Picard and Data to Romulus using a cloaking device to evade detection. En route, the Klingons inform Picard that they have intercepted a message of interest to him: Sarek has died.

On the Enterprise, Commander Riker leads the investigation of the T'Pau. They discover that its remains are missing from a salvage yard. The Enterprise gets in a firefight with a vessel stealing from the salvage yard; the enemy vessel is destroyed in the battle without being identified.

On Romulus, Picard and Data (disguised as Romulans) wait where they believe Pardek will be, since he has relatives who live there and the senate is not in session. Eventually Pardek arrives, but when they approach him they find themselves met by soldiers and taken to a cavern. Pardek arrives, explaining that Romulan security knew they were on-planet and they've been brought underground for their safety. Picard states that he is looking for Ambassador Spock, who emerges from a nearby tunnel.

=== Part II ===
Spock tells Picard to leave Romulus. Picard informs him of the Federation's concern he has defected and as their representative demands to know what Spock is doing on Romulus. Spock confirms he hasn't defected but refuses to give any other explanation and again demands Picard leave. Picard tells him the Federation will not put up with his "cowboy diplomacy", before then telling him that Sarek has died. Spock takes the news of his father's death stoically. He explains to Picard that during the peace negotiations with the Klingons decades earlier (seen in the movie Star Trek VI: The Undiscovered Country), he felt responsible for putting Captain Kirk and his crew at risk, and so is now working alone on a "personal mission of peace" to re-unify the Vulcan and Romulan people. He is working with an underground movement, composed of Romulans who have embraced Vulcan philosophy and wish to reunite the two peoples despite their centuries of differences. Pardek has asked Spock to come to Romulus to meet with the new Proconsul of the Romulan Senate, a young idealist who has promised reforms. Picard expresses concern that the willingness of the Romulans may be part of a larger ploy. Spock agrees but points out that if a larger plot is at work, it is best they play out their roles within it to uncover it.

On the Klingon ship Spock and Data work together to break a Romulan code, and complement one another. Spock remarks that Data has by default the ideal Vulcan state of pure logic without emotion, yet would give it up to be human. Data states that Spock is half-human, but chose to live a Vulcan way of life so gave up what Data is trying to achieve. When Spock expresses that he has "no regrets", Data notes that he has used a human phrase. Spock considers this and declares it "fascinating".

Picard, Data, and Spock are betrayed by Pardek and handed over to Commander Sela (Tasha Yar's daughter), who is planning a Romulan conquest of Vulcan. The stolen Vulcan ship and two others are carrying a 2,000-strong Romulan invasion force, under the guise of escorting a peace envoy. Spock refuses to deceive his people by announcing the false news, even after Sela threatens to kill him, and she locks the three in her office and leaves to order the ships on their way. By the time she returns, Data has hacked into the Romulan computer system and created a holographic simulation that distracts her long enough for the three captives to incapacitate her and her officers.

Meanwhile, the Enterprise arrives at Galorndon Core, discovering the three Vulcan ships, and moves to block their approach to Vulcan. A medical distress signal comes in—a distraction created by Sela—but as Riker orders the ship toward its source, they receive a broadcast from Romulus in which Spock reveals the true nature of the Vulcan ships. A Romulan Warbird de-cloaks, destroys the ships, and re-cloaks, killing the troops instead of allowing them to be captured.

On Romulus, the remaining underground successfully hides itself. Data and Picard prepare to leave but Spock announces he will remain. The Ambassador tells them he is now more certain that ever that reunification between the Vulcans and Romulans will happen, but it will not be achieved through diplomacy or politics. Rather, the Vulcan philosophy will inevitably spread through the society as it did the underground, with Spock understanding that while reunification will likely not happen in his lifetime it is still a cause worth pursuing and he must help it happen. Upon learning that Spock and Sarek never shared a mind-meld, Picard offers Spock a chance to touch what Sarek shared with him. As the two meld, Spock feels the depth of his father's feelings towards him and his face fills with emotion.

== Background ==
These episodes were aired in the weeks before the release of Star Trek VI: The Undiscovered Country. Spock makes reference to the events of the movie when he asks Picard if he was aware of Spock's role in the first peace overtures to the Klingon Empire. Picard is aware of the public history of Spock's role, but not the whole story. Spock says that he forced Captain Kirk to accept the mission, and that he felt responsible for what happened to Kirk and his crew. This time, Spock only wants to risk his own life, which is why he came to Romulus on his own.

Leonard Nimoy had previously requested $1 million to cameo in the series, but he took minimum SAG pay to reprise the role of Spock to publicize Star Trek VI: The Undiscovered Country, on which he was executive producer.

The Star Trek: Discovery episode "Unification III" is a sequel to this two-parter; it sees Romulan and Vulcan societies united and living on the (now-renamed) 31st Century Vulcan homeworld Ni'Var.

== Production ==
This episode is one of four times that an original series character reprised his role in The Next Generation; the other three being "Encounter at Farpoint" (DeForest Kelley), "Sarek" (Mark Lenard), and "Relics" (James Doohan).

Both episodes were dedicated to the late Gene Roddenberry, who had died shortly prior to their broadcast.

== Reception ==
In 2012, Keith DeCandido of Tor.com gave Part I of "Unification" a rating of six out of ten, and Part II a rating of four out of ten.

In 2017, Den of Geek included "Unification" as one of their 25 recommended episodes to watch of Star Trek: The Next Generation. In 2017, Den of Geek also ranked Mark Lenard as Sarek in Star Trek: The Next Generation as one of the top ten guest star roles on Star Trek: The Next Generation, noting his performances in "Sarek" and "Unification" (Part I).

In 2016, Empire ranked this the 29th best out of the top fifty episodes of all the 700-plus Star Trek television episodes, praising actor-director Leonard Nimoy reprising the character Spock, and his scenes with Jean-Luc Picard.

In 2018, CBR rated the "Unification" as the ninth best multi-episode story arc of Star Trek.

In 2019, the Edmonton Journal ranked this as having one of the top ten Spock character moments, pointing out the presentation of Spock with Spock's line "Indeed you have found him", references to Star Trek VI: The Undiscovered Country, and advancing the narrative between Spock and Sarek that began with the original series episode "Journey to Babel".

In 2019, Nerdist included this episode on their "Best of Spock" binge-watching guide. They suggested that Spock's devotion to uniting the Romulan and Vulcan people as depicted in this episode was a "metaphor for his own personal struggle".

In 2020, SyFy also recommended watching "Unification, Part I" and "Unification, Part II" as background on the Romulans for Star Trek: Picard.

In 2020, Space.com recommended watching this episode as background for Star Trek: Picard.

== Home video ==
Parts I and II of "Unification" were released on LaserDisc on February 18, 1997, in the United States.

Both parts of "Unification" were released in the United Kingdom on one VHS cassette (catalog number VH4104).

The episode was released in the United States on November 5, 2002, as part of the Season 5 DVD box set.

On November 19, 2013, "Unification" was released in high-definition video on Blu-Ray disc, as a standalone product. (It was also released in the season box set)

The first Blu-ray release was in the United States on November 18, 2013, followed by the United Kingdom the next day, November 19, 2013.

== Novel ==
A novelization of this episode was published by Pocket Books, and was written by TNG producer (and screenwriter of "Unification I") Jeri Taylor. It was one of five novelizations to be made of The Next Generation episodes, alongside "Encounter at Farpoint," "Descent," "Relics," and "All Good Things...."

The 1995 Star Trek novel Crossover by Michael Jan Friedman is a story that follows up on the events in "Unification"; Spock continues to work on Vulcan, and once again Picard is involved, but also Ambassador McCoy and Scotty. The events of the novel are set after "All Good Things...," but before the movie Star Trek: Generations.
