= Final Mission =

- Star Trek: The Next Generation episode
- Episode no.: Season 4 Episode 9
- Directed by: Corey Allen
- Story by: Kasey Arnold-Ince
- Teleplay by: Kasey Arnold-Ince; Jeri Taylor
- Production code: 183
- Original air date: November 19, 1990

Guest appearances
- Nick Tate - Dirgo; Kim Hamilton - Songi; Mary Kohnert - Tess Allenby

Episode chronology
← Previous "Future Imperfect"	Next → "The Loss"
- Star Trek: The Next Generation season 4

"Final Mission" is the 83rd episode of the American science fiction television series Star Trek: The Next Generation, and the ninth episode of the fourth season. Set in the 24th century, the series follows the adventures of the Starfleet crew of the Federation starship Enterprise-D.

In "Final Mission", Wesley Crusher learns that he finally has been accepted into Starfleet Academy. Wesley welcomes Captain Picard's invitation to accompany him on an away mission that could resolve a mining dispute on an arid world. Following a shuttle crash and a disastrous search for water that leaves the captain near death, Wesley finds himself charged with the responsibility of keeping both himself and Picard alive until a rescue team can locate them.

"Final Mission" was the last episode where Wesley Crusher was an opening-credits regular actor, although he returned as a guest star in several later episodes of The Next Generation.

== Plot ==
The Enterprise has traveled to the Pentarus system where Captain Picard (Patrick Stewart) must mediate a dispute among some miners on the fifth planet. Wesley Crusher (Wil Wheaton) receives word that he has been accepted to Starfleet Academy and, for his final mission, he will accompany Picard on his shuttle trip to Pentarus V. A distress call comes in from Gamilon V, where an unidentified vessel has entered orbit and is giving off lethal doses of radiation. Picard orders Riker to take the Enterprise to resolve that situation while he and Wesley travel in a shuttle sent by the miners, commanded by Captain Dirgo.

En route, Dirgo's shuttle malfunctions and they are forced to crash-land on the surface of a harsh, desert-like moon. Though they are unharmed, the shuttle is beyond repair, and its communication systems and food replicators are disabled. Dirgo admits he has no emergency supplies on board, so they are forced to search for shelter and water. With his tricorder, Wesley identifies some caves and a potential source of water some distance away, and the three set out across the desert. Reaching a cave, they find a fountain-like water source, but it is protected by a crystalline force field. Dirgo attempts to use his phaser to destroy the field, but this activates a burst of energy from the fountain which encases the phaser in an impenetrable shell and causes a rockslide. Picard pushes Wesley out of the way but is severely injured by the falling rocks.

Meanwhile, the Enterprise has arrived at Gamilon V, finding the unidentified ship is an abandoned 300 year old garbage scow filled with radioactive waste. Their initial attempt to attach thrusters to the barge to propel it through an asteroid belt into the Gamilon sun remotely fails, and Commander Riker (Jonathan Frakes) is forced to attempt to tow the barge using the tractor beam, exposing the crew to the lethal radiation.

As Wesley continues to analyze the force field, Dirgo becomes impatient and attempts to breach the field again with Picard's phaser with help from a reluctant Wesley firing a phaser, but this time the energy burst encases Dirgo as well, killing him. Picard, weak from his injuries, gives Wesley advice about the academy, and tells him he is proud of him. Wesley tells Picard that the captain has taught him to never give up. On the Enterprise, despite the rising radiation levels on board, Riker manages to get the barge headed into the sun, then leaves to help in the search for the shuttle.

Wesley continues to study the fountain, and devises a plan to disable the force field. He jury-rigs his combadge and tricorder. He fires his phaser at the fountain to attract the energy defense mechanism, but reprograms it using his tricorder to manipulate the energy burst. It passes harmlessly through him and instead removes the force field, allowing Wesley to access the water.

Shortly thereafter, the Enterprise locates the wreckage of the mining shuttle, and Picard and Wesley are rescued. As Picard is carried from the cave, he tells Wesley that he will be missed.

== Releases ==
"Final Mission" was released in the United States on September 3, 2002, as part of the Star Trek: The Next Generation season four DVD box set.

On April 23, 1996, episodes "The Loss" and "Final Mission" were released on LaserDisc in the United States by Paramount Home Video. Both episodes were included on a single double sided 12 inch optical disc, with a Dolby Surround sound track.

== Reception ==
Keith R. A. DeCandido wrote a retrospective in 2012 for Reactor magazine in which he gave the episode a lukewarm review, rating it a 4/10. He thought that the story hit all of the most common plot beats for a departing character too directly, descending into cliché. He hypothesized that the negative fan reaction to Tasha Yar's pointless death in season 1 inspired the writers to make sure Wesley got a send-off with plenty of screentime with Picard, a chance to show off his skills, learn a lesson, and so on; but the result was overly predictable. DeCandido also thought that the episode didn't have Wesley solve the forcefield problem in a particularly clever way – he just used technobabble to get access to the fountain's water.

Zack Handlen of The A.V. Club found Wesley's climactic, emotional speech to the dying Picard ineffective and felt that it highlighted a juvenile "fan worship" of Picard, that he considered an ongoing, fundamental flaw in Wesley's character. Nevertheless, he rated the episode a B+, praising its "grounded character writing," the performance of Wil Wheaton, and the "well-realized" handling of the science fiction conflict, which he felt effectively balanced the mystery of the obstacle with the clearly established rules of how it functioned.
