= The Loss =

- Star Trek: The Next Generation episode
- Episode no.: Season 4 Episode 10
- Directed by: Chip Chalmers
- Story by: Hilary J. Bader
- Teleplay by: Hilary J. Bader; Alan J. Adler; Vanessa Greene
- Production code: 184
- Original air date: December 31, 1990

Guest appearances
- Kim Braden - Janet Brooks; Mary Kohnert - Tess Allenby; Whoopi Goldberg - Guinan

Episode chronology
← Previous "Final Mission"	Next → "Data's Day"
- Star Trek: The Next Generation season 4

"The Loss" is the 84th episode of the American science fiction television series Star Trek: The Next Generation, and the tenth episode of the fourth season. It originally aired on December 31, 1990.

Set in the 24th century, the series follows the adventures of the Starfleet crew of the Federation starship Enterprise-D. In this episode, the USS Enterprise becomes trapped within a field of two-dimensional lifeforms, while Counselor Troi struggles with the sudden unexpected loss of her empathic abilities.

== Plot ==
Traveling through deep space, the Enterprise stops to investigate an odd phenomenon of phantom sensor readings. Meanwhile, ship's counselor Deanna Troi experiences pain and loses consciousness as her empathic abilities suddenly cease to work.

The crew discovers they cannot resume course, as the Enterprise is caught up in a group of two-dimensional lifeforms.

Without her powers, Troi suffers a tremendous sense of loss, and goes through several classic psychological stages, including denial, fear and anger. Ultimately, despite the reassurances of her friends, she resigns as ship's counselor, believing that without her empathic abilities she cannot perform her duties.

Commander Data and Commander Riker determine that the two-dimensional creatures are heading for a cosmic string, with the Enterprise in tow, and that once they reach the string the ship will be torn apart. Realizing that Troi's loss and the ship's predicament are somehow linked, Captain Picard pleads with her to try and communicate with the strange creatures.

After attempting to warn the creatures of the danger posed by the cosmic string, Troi posits that they are seeking out the cosmic string in much the way a moth is drawn to a flame. Working from this hypothesis, Data simulates the vibration of a cosmic string, using the deflector dish at a position well behind the Enterprise. The simulations eventually cause the creatures to briefly reverse their course, breaking their momentum long enough to allow the Enterprise to break free.

Freed from the two-dimensional creatures' influence, Troi's empathic ability is restored. She discovers that her powers were never lost, but were instead overwhelmed by the two-dimensional creatures' strong emotions. Troi returns to her old job with a renewed confidence.

== Production ==
This episode was overall written by Hilary J. Bader. Bader began as TNG season 3 writing intern, and would also write for "Dark Page" and one other episode "Hero Worship" (3 total for TNG).

The teleplay was written by Hilary J. Bader, Alan J. Alder, and Vanessa Greene.

== Reception ==
In 2019, ScreenRant ranked it the 8th worst episode of Star Trek: The Next Generation based on IMDB ratings, which was 6 out of 10 at that time.

In 2020, Syfy highlighted this episode for the character of Troi, noting how it gives her "dramatic moments of crisis" rather than having to more typically offer advice to others.

== Releases ==
"The Loss" was released in the United States on September 3, 2002, as part of the Star Trek: The Next Generation season four DVD box set.

On April 23, 1996, episodes "The Loss" and "Final Mission" were released on LaserDisc in the United States by Paramount Home Video. Both episodes were included on a single double sided 12 inch optical disc, with a Dolby Surround sound track.
