= Hero Worship (Star Trek: The Next Generation) =

- Star Trek: The Next Generation episode
- Episode no.: Season 5 Episode 11
- Directed by: Patrick Stewart
- Story by: Hilary J. Bader
- Teleplay by: Joe Menosky
- Cinematography by: Marvin Rush
- Production code: 211
- Original air date: January 27, 1992

Guest appearances
- Joshua Harris - Timothy; Harley Venton - Hutchinson

Episode chronology
← Previous "New Ground"	Next → "Violations"
- Star Trek: The Next Generation season 5

"Hero Worship" is the 111th episode of the syndicated American science fiction television series Star Trek: The Next Generation. This is the 11th episode of the fifth season, directed by series castmember Patrick Stewart (Captain Jean-Luc Picard). Star Trek creator Gene Roddenberry – by this time no longer involved in production – died during the filming of this episode.

Set in the 24th century, the series follows the adventures of the Starfleet crew of the Federation starship Enterprise-D. In this episode, Data rescues an orphaned boy from a damaged ship. As a way to repress his own pain, the boy begins to mimic Data's emotionless personality.

== Plot ==
The Enterprise investigates the disappearance of the research vessel Vico. They encounter the wrecked ship adrift just outside a black cluster. Data, La Forge, and Riker beam aboard and find everyone on the Vico is dead except for a young boy named Timothy, trapped beneath debris. Data rescues Timothy and brings him back to the Enterprise. As Dr. Crusher examines Timothy in sickbay, he claims that unknown aliens killed the crew.

Timothy struggles to adapt to his new surroundings and trusts only his rescuer, Data. Counselor Troi asks Data to spend time with Timothy, believing that he might open up about Vico's destruction. Timothy is intrigued by the fact that androids do not experience emotions and begins to imitate Data’s movements and speech patterns.

Observing Timothy's new android persona, Troi reasons that he is attempting to suppress his trauma and suggests that Data can help him heal by sharing his fascination with humanity. While sipping on soft drinks with Timothy in Ten Forward, Data reflects on his limitations as an android, such as the inability to feel delight over a confection or take pride in his achievements. Timothy argues that androids do not feel negative emotions either, but Data counters that he would gladly risk feeling bad at times for the opportunity to taste his dessert.

When Enterprise enters the cluster, Worf reports sensor distortions caused by the area's strong gravitational forces, which would limit a ship’s ability to fire weapons or use a cloaking device. Picard concludes that aliens could not have attacked the Vico. Confronted with the evidence, Timothy breaks down and tearfully shares his belief that he destroyed the Vico when he lost his balance and fell against a computer panel. Data assures him that starship computers have safeguards against such occurrences and that he was not responsible.

A shock wave rocks the Enterprise. Worf raises the shields, but the next shock wave is stronger. As additional power is diverted to the shields, the waves intensify. Timothy recalls the Vico's crew following similar procedures, including La Forge's suggestion of redirecting power from the warp engines. Sparked by Timothy's words, Data runs a quick analysis and realizes that the shields themselves are creating the shock waves, and strengthening them further would result in the ship being torn apart. Picard orders the shields lowered, and the next wave is harmless.

Later, Data observes Timothy playing with the other children at school, behaving as a human again, and the two agree to remain friends.

== Writing ==
This episode was written by Hilary J. Bader; Bader began as TNG season 3 writing intern, and would also write for "The Loss" and "Dark Page" (3 total for TNG). Bader went on to write for many children's cartoon shows and comic books. The teleplay was written by Joe Menosky.

== Reception ==
In 1993, Trek Van Hise in Trek: The Next Generation said the episode was "excellent" and noted Patrick Stewart as the director.

In 2000, in Diplomacy, family, destiny: The Next Generation the episode was noted as a "bizarre psychological drama".

In 2011, The A.V. Club gave the episode a "B+", and while questioning the use of child actors, felt that the episode was example of how the series was willing to confront loss; overall they were happy with the writing and characters.

In 2020, GameSpot recommended this episode for background on the character of Data.

In 2020, Looper listed this as one of the best episodes for Data.

== Releases ==
The episode was released in the United States on November 5, 2002, as part of the season five DVD box set. The first Blu-ray release was in the United States on November 18, 2013, followed by the United Kingdom the next day, November 19, 2013.
