= The Game (Star Trek: The Next Generation) =

- Star Trek: The Next Generation episode
- Episode no.: Season 5 Episode 6
- Directed by: Corey Allen
- Story by: Susan Sackett; Fred Bronson; Brannon Braga
- Teleplay by: Brannon Braga
- Production code: 206
- Original air date: October 28, 1991

Guest appearances
- Ashley Judd as Robin Lefler; Katherine Moffat as Etana Jol; Colm Meaney as Miles O'Brien; Patti Yasutake as Alyssa Ogawa; Wil Wheaton as Wesley Crusher; Diane M. Hurley as Woman; Majel Barrett as Computer voice

Episode chronology
← Previous "Disaster"	Next → "Unification"
- Star Trek: The Next Generation season 5

"The Game" is the 106th episode of the American science fiction television series Star Trek: The Next Generation, the sixth episode of the fifth season.

== Plot ==
William Riker visits Risa and is introduced to a virtual game by Etana Jol, a Ktarian woman with whom he has become romantically involved during his vacation on the pleasure planet. Riker, upon his return to the Enterprise, distributes replicated copies of the game to the crew.

Cadet Wesley Crusher, on vacation from Starfleet Academy, is visiting the Enterprise and notices everyone playing the game. Doctor Beverly Crusher, Wesley's mother, secretly switches off Lieutenant Commander Data and sabotages his circuits because he would be immune to the game's addictive properties. The game compels people who play it by stimulating the pleasure centers of their brains when they complete each level.

Wesley reports to Captain Jean-Luc Picard his suspicions that the game is dangerous. However, Picard is already addicted. Eventually, Wesley and his new girlfriend, Ensign Robin Lefler, are the only people on the ship who have yet to become addicted to the game. Wesley and Robin discover that Data's injuries were sabotage and begin working on a plan to stop the spread of the game. Wesley meets Robin in engineering, where he learns that she has come under the influence of the game, presumably having been captured by the crew and forced to play. Riker and Worf pursue Wesley, as he is the last non-addicted person on the ship. They trap him in an access tunnel and take him to the bridge, where he is restrained and forced to play the game.

Data, having been examined and repaired by Wesley and Ensign Lefler before they were forced to submit to the game, frees the rest of the crew from their mind-controlled state by flashing pulses of light in their faces from a handheld lamp (a "palm beacon"). The crew then discerns the purpose of the game: It rendered them extremely susceptible to the power of suggestion, compelling them to aid the games' creators, the Ktarians, in an attempt to take control of the Enterprise and eventually the Federation. Picard captures the Ktarian vessel, captained by Etana Jol, who is responsible for distributing the games, and has it towed to the nearest spacedock. Wesley and Lefler bid each other a reluctant farewell as he returns to Starfleet Academy.

== Reception ==
In 2012, this episode was noted by Forbes as an alternative top ten Star Trek: The Next Generation episode selection. They note its themes about pleasure and addiction, as well as remarking on a scene in which Deanna eats a dessert.

In 2017, Io9 noted "The Game" for being one of the weirdest TNG adventures, with the crew being controlled by a highly addictive augmented reality video game.

TV Guide listed Ashley Judd's acting role as Ensign Robin Lefler as one of 28 surprising guest acting roles on Star Trek, noting that she appears in the episode "Darmok" (Season 5 Episode 2) in addition to this episode. The romance between the Robin and Wesley characters is also noted. The character of Robin Lefler was ranked as the 71st most important character of Starfleet within the Star Trek universe.

Star Trek novel author Peter David utilized the character Robin Lefler in his Star Trek: New Frontier books.

In 2019, Screen Rant included the relationship between Riker and Etana on the planet Risa on a list of bad one-off romances on the show.

In 2020, GameSpot noted this episode as having one of the most bizarre moments of the series, citing the moment when Wesley is forced to play the game.

== Releases ==
The episode was released in the United States on November 5, 2002, as part of the Season 5 DVD box set. The first Blu-ray release was in the United States on November 18, 2013, followed by the United Kingdom the next day, November 19, 2013.
