= Ascian language =

Fictional language

The Ascian language is a fictional language invented by Gene Wolfe for his science fiction series The Book of the New Sun.

The language is spoken by the inhabitants of the “northern continents” of a future Earth, the Ascians, who are enslaved by their masters (the Group of Seventeen) in a way much like the people of Oceania in George Orwell's book 1984.

== Etymology ==
Although unfamiliar to most readers, this is not a word invented by Wolfe, nor is it a form of "Asians"; rather, it means 'dweller of the tropics', and it came into English by way of medieval Latin as an adaptation of ancient Greek ἄσκιος, literally 'without a shadow'. In the tropics, the sun is exactly overhead at noon twice a year, and at that time a person standing straight up will cast no shadow.

== The language ==
The Ascian language consists of two levels: On the low level it is an ordinary language, of whose syntax, grammar and vocabulary virtually nothing is known. The second level is more complex and unique.

Although Ascian is their mother tongue, adult Ascians do not understand plain Ascian sentences unless they are direct quotations from governmental propaganda materials, referred to as Correct Thought. Thus, in order to communicate, an Ascian has to know by heart thousands of these quotations (sentences) on many different topics.

As the northern continents are at war with the southern Commonwealth (where most protagonists of the books live), there are interpreters in the Ascian army to interrogate prisoners. These speak the language of the Commonwealth, but as they are unable to think outside the approved texts, what they say is merely literal translations of the Ascian approved sentences.

A very similar concept of a language is presented in the Star Trek: The Next Generation episode "Darmok" from 1991.

=== Psychology ===
The reason for the Group of Seventeen to impose on their people this complicated concept of a language is much like Orwell's concept of Newspeak. In order to prevent the Ascians from ever developing critical thought (and subsequently inciting revolts), the language is limited as to make it impossible to express any such thought. This corresponds to the Sapir–Whorf hypothesis.

Nevertheless, Gene Wolfe suggests that in practice, the concept of Ascian does not work out entirely as intended. It is shown that intelligent Ascians are very well able to express, by means of approved sentences only, meanings that exceed those of the quoted sources. They simply quote sentences which have certain connotations, regardless of the actual meaning of the approved text.

=== Examples ===
In "The Citadel of the Autarch", the fourth volume of The Book of the New Sun series, there is a story told by an Ascian prisoner (who identifies himself only as "Loyal to the Group of Seventeen"), which is translated by people of the Commonwealth into our way of speaking. Some examples from this story are:

- "In times past, loyalty to the cause of the populace was to be found everywhere. The will of the Group of Seventeen was the will of everyone."
  "Once upon a time…"
- "The people meeting in counsel may judge, but no one is to receive more than a hundred blows."
  "He complained, and they beat him."
- "How are the hands nourished? By the blood. How does the blood reach the hands? By the veins. If the veins are closed, the hands will rot away."
  "He left that farm and took to the roads."
- "Where the Group of Seventeen sit, there final justice is done."
  "He went to the capital and complained of the way he had been treated."
