= Star Trek: Insurrection =

1998 film by Jonathan Frakes

- Theatrical release poster
- Directed by: Jonathan Frakes
- Screenplay by: Michael Piller
- Story by: Rick Berman; Michael Piller
- Based on: Star Trek by Gene Roddenberry
- Produced by: Rick Berman
- Starring: Patrick Stewart; Jonathan Frakes; Brent Spiner; LeVar Burton; Michael Dorn; Gates McFadden; Marina Sirtis; F. Murray Abraham; Donna Murphy; Anthony Zerbe
- Cinematography: Matthew F. Leonetti
- Edited by: Peter E. Berger
- Music by: Jerry Goldsmith
- Production company: Paramount Pictures
- Distributed by: Paramount Pictures
- Release date: December 11, 1998
- Running time: 103 minutes
- Country: United States
- Language: English
- Budget: $70 million
- Box office: $118 million

Star Trek: Insurrection is a 1998 American science fiction film directed by Jonathan Frakes. It is the ninth installment in the Star Trek film series, as well as the third to star the cast of Star Trek: The Next Generation, with F. Murray Abraham, Donna Murphy, and Anthony Zerbe appearing in main roles. In the film, the crew of the USS Enterprise-E rebels against Starfleet command after they discover a conspiracy with a species known as the Son'a to steal the peaceful Ba'ku's planet for its rejuvenating properties.

Paramount Pictures sought a change of pace after Star Trek: First Contact (1996). Michael Piller was asked to write the script of the next installment, which was created from story ideas by Piller and producer Rick Berman. The story's first drafts featured the Romulans, and the Son'a and Ba'ku were introduced in its third draft. After Ira Steven Behr reviewed the script, Piller revised it and added a subplot involving a romantic interest for Jean-Luc Picard. The film's ending was further revised after test screenings. The special effects depicting outer space were completely computer generated, a first for a Star Trek film. The Ba'ku village was fully built on location at Lake Sherwood, California, but suffered weather damage. Sets from the Star Trek television series Voyager and Deep Space Nine were reused and redressed.

Upon its release in theaters on December 11, 1998, Insurrection went on to gross $118 million worldwide. Critical responses to the film were mixed; the performance of Patrick Stewart and the directing of Jonathan Frakes were praised, while many critics compared it to an extended episode of the television series. Insurrection was nominated for both a Saturn Award and a Hugo Award, but the only award it received was a Youth in Film Award for Michael Welch. The film was followed by Star Trek: Nemesis in 2002.

== Plot ==
Lieutenant Commander Data is temporarily transferred to an undercover mission observing the peaceful Ba'ku people. He suddenly malfunctions and reveals the presence of the joint Federation–Son'a task force observing the Ba'ku. Admiral Dougherty contacts the USS Enterprise-E to obtain Data's schematics for recovery purposes. Captain Jean-Luc Picard ignores orders and takes Enterprise to recover Data. Upon successfully recovering and repairing Data, Picard becomes suspicious when Dougherty insists that Enterprise is no longer needed and orders Data's malfunction to be investigated.

The crew discovers that the Ba'ku are technologically advanced with warp capabilities, but have rejected the use of technology for simpler lives. Due to unique "metaphasic particles" emanating from the planet's rings, the inhabitants are effectively immortal. By contrast, the Federation's allies, the Son'a, are a decrepit race who rely on medical technology to delay death; excessive cosmetic surgery gives them a mummified appearance. The Enterprise crew experience the rejuvenation effects of the planet: Lt. Commander Geordi La Forge can now see without ocular implants, Lt. Commander Worf experiences puberty symptoms, Commander William Riker and Counselor Deanna Troi rekindle their long-abandoned relationship, and Picard develops a romantic relationship with Anij, a Ba'ku woman.

Data and Picard discover a submerged and cloaked Federation ship containing a gigantic holodeck that recreates the Ba'ku village. Data's malfunction stemmed from a Son'a attack, the result of his accidentally discovering their vessel. Picard confronts Dougherty and learns that top Federation officers colluded with the Son'a to relocate the Ba'ku to another planet deceptively, allowing the particles to be collected (massively poisoning the planet in the process). Dougherty then orders Enterprise to leave. Picard defiantly retorts that the particles' medical benefits do not justify Dougherty's plans for the Ba'ku and that they violate Starfleet's Prime Directive.

Picard and some crew help the Ba'ku escape abduction while Riker moves the Enterprise to transmission range to communicate the violation to Starfleet. The Son'a launches robotic probes to locate and capture the fleeing Ba'ku. The Son'a leader, Ahdar Ru'afo, convinces Dougherty to allow two Son'a ships to attack the Enterprise, but Enterprise escapes after taking damage and destroying a Son'a ship. With the Son'a plan exposed, Ru'afo insists on immediately harvesting the radiation source. Picard, Anij, and several Ba'ku are transported as prisoners onto the Son'a ship.

Dr. Beverly Crusher discovers that the Son'a and the Ba'ku are the same race. Picard then informs Dougherty that Dougherty has unknowingly involved Starfleet in an internecine dispute: the Son'a are a Ba’ku splinter faction who rejected their Ba’ku idyllic existence a century earlier and embraced technology. When the Son’a failed in their attempt to seize power, the Ba'ku elders exiled them from the planet, and thus from the rings' rejuvenating effects. The Son'a developed an artificial, imperfect, painful means to extend their lives and mitigate their aged appearance, and now seek revenge against their own people, the Ba’ku. Ru'afo kills Dougherty after he reneges on their plan, and moves to complete the collection.

While Picard is prepared for execution, he convinces the disillusioned Son'a Gallatin to help him stop Ru'afo. Picard masterminds a ruse to transport Ru'afo and his bridge crew to the holoship and disable the harvester. Ru'afo discovers the deception and transports to the harvester ship to manually restart the process. Picard follows and sets the harvester to self-destruct, killing Ru'afo just as the Enterprise rescues Picard. The remaining Son'a are forgiven and welcomed back by the Ba'ku. As gratitude for Gallatin’s help, Picard arranges a reunion between Gallatin and his Ba'ku mother, who embraces her son. The crew takes a moment to enjoy their rejuvenated selves before returning to their previous mission.

== Cast ==
- Patrick Stewart as Captain Jean-Luc Picard
- Jonathan Frakes as Commander William T. Riker
- Brent Spiner as Lieutenant Commander Data
- LeVar Burton as Lieutenant Commander Geordi La Forge
- Michael Dorn as Lieutenant Commander Worf
- Gates McFadden as Doctor Beverly Crusher
- Marina Sirtis as Counselor Deanna Troi
- F. Murray Abraham as Ru'afo, the commander of the Son'a.
- Donna Murphy as Anij, a Ba'ku woman.
- Anthony Zerbe as Vice Admiral Dougherty.
- Gregg Henry as Gallatin, a member of the Son'a crew and Ru'afo's second in command.
- Daniel Hugh Kelly as Sojef, a Ba'ku man.
- Michael Welch as Artim, Sojef's son.
- Mark Deakins as Tournel, a young Ba'ku man.
- Stephanie Niznik as Ensign Perim.

Patrick Stewart thought that the first Next Generation film, Star Trek Generations, was too much like a television episode but thought that his character, Captain Jean-Luc Picard, was redefined as a "movie hero" in Star Trek: First Contact. He was concerned that in the new film the character would return to that seen in the television series. Michael Piller said that in order to be a hero, Picard "should be acting out of a moral and ethical mindset, and stand for principles that are important to [humanity]". Stewart was later pleased with the film's romantic sub-plot, calling it "charming" and saying that he was "feeling very good about it." He thought that the film had a lighter tone than previous films, saying, "It shows our crew having a little more fun than we normally see them doing". Stewart was disappointed that a scene in which Picard and Anij kiss was cut from the final version of the film, saying that "It was a studio decision, but still somewhat inexplicable to me as I feel the audience were waiting for some kind of romantic culmination to the relationship, which did happen and was extremely pleasant." Stewart received a producer's credit on the film.

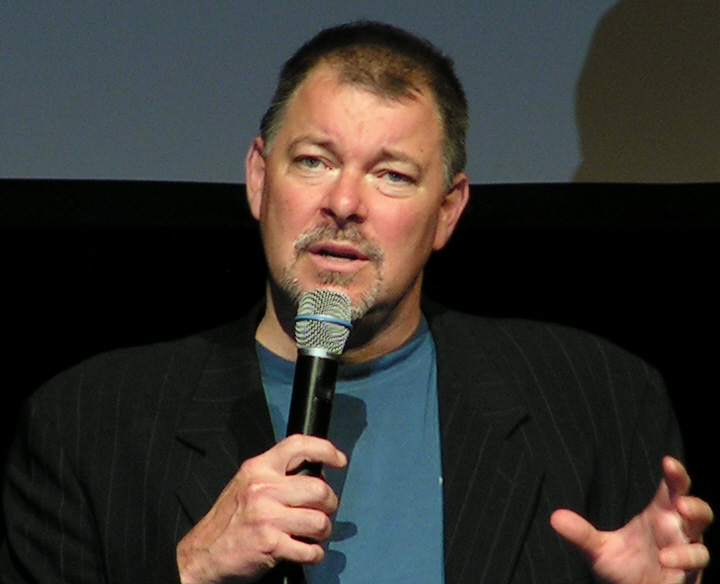
Star Trek: Insurrection is the second Star Trek film to be directed by Jonathan Frakes.

Jonathan Frakes appeared as Commander William Riker, and as with First Contact he directed the project. Brent Spiner starred as Lieutenant Commander Data, asking for the character to be killed in Insurrection out of concern for aging out of the role. His copy of the script came with a note from the production team saying, "Sorry, kill you later". The underwater scene required Spiner to wear extra makeup to make it waterproof. LeVar Burton reprised his role of Lieutenant Commander Geordi La Forge; a month before the release of Insurrection he appeared in the role in a guest appearance in the Star Trek: Voyager episode "Timeless".

Michael Dorn returned as Lieutenant Commander Worf, having portrayed him in Deep Space Nine since 1995. Reprising her role as Doctor Beverly Crusher, Gates McFadden said that "Shooting Star Trek and getting paid to do it is great. But what's actually changed my life the most is traveling around and ... being a tiny little part of this huge mythology that has changed people's lives, in many ways for the better." Marina Sirtis appeared once more as Counselor Deanna Troi. She was positive about the film, saying "we've been involved with this for eleven years, we've done 179 episodes, three movies, and there are still surprises. There are more layers in this movie, it's not as black and white. It goes back to a lot of what Gene Roddenberry felt about Star Trek — I think he's going to be very happy up there when he sees this movie."

Before the casting process, no actors had been considered for the roles of the Son'a leader, the Ba'ku woman, and the Starfleet admiral. The Son'a leader, Ahdar Ru'afo, was portrayed by F. Murray Abraham, who won an Academy Award for his performance in Amadeus. Abraham was given the role without an audition. Abraham said of the franchise, "I was around when the series was first introduced to television and it was a hoot". He praised his make-up and prosthetics, saying "The idea that you can be somebody else behind the mask is an extraordinary feeling — it's very primitive and mysterious. A gap opens somewhere in the brain and it encourages wildness. It had me chewing at the scenery". He was particularly pleased to be working with Patrick Stewart.

Donna Murphy played the Ba'ku woman Anij, who is Picard's love interest. Eighty actresses auditioned for the role, which was awarded to Murphy who had previously won two Tony Awards for her roles in the Broadway musicals Passion and The King and I. Murphy was such a favorite of Frakes and the producers that after auditioning, only a small number of other actresses were seen. She said of the role, "I feel a great honor and responsibility to be a part of this film, because I know that the Star Trek audience has such a devotion to and affection for these richly drawn characters."

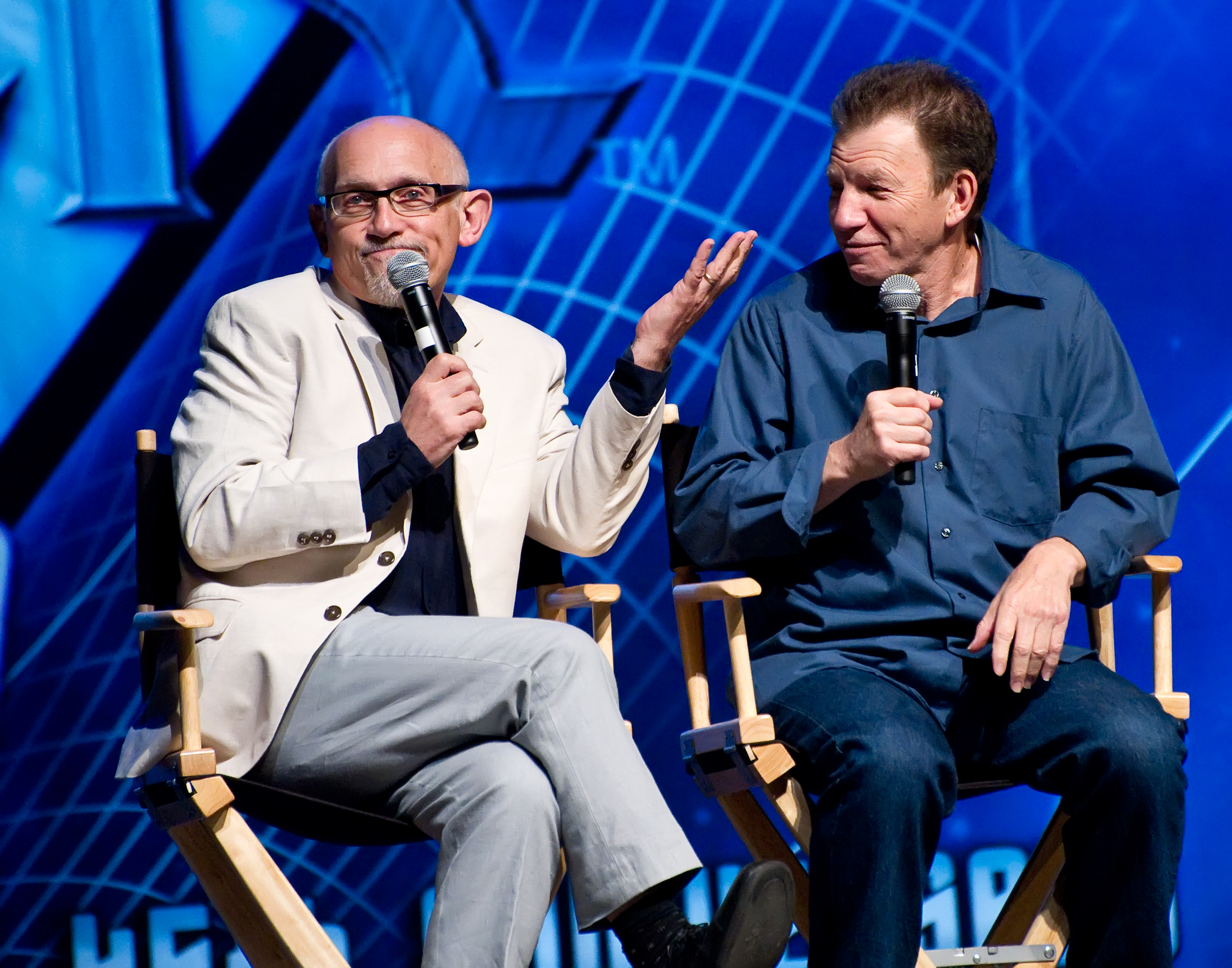
Filmed scenes featuring Armin Shimerman and Max Grodénchik were cut from the final release of the film.

Anthony Zerbe originally auditioned for the role of Ru'afo, and was considered to be the best choice for it. However, the production team decided instead to cast him in the role of Admiral Matthew Dougherty. During Zerbe's audition, instead of reading the lines provided, he recited Dante's Inferno before seamlessly moving into the script. Frakes and the producers unanimously decided to award him the part of Dougherty. In the film's smaller roles, Stephanie Niznik played Ensign Kell Perim and Daniel Hugh Kelly appeared as Sojef. Gregg Henry appeared as Gallatin, and 10-year-old Michael Welch played the Ba'ku child Artim. Michael Horton returned as the tactical officer he portrayed in First Contact; his character was called Lieutenant Daniels in this film. Rage Against the Machine and Audioslave guitarist Tom Morello played a Son'a warrior. Morello's make-up regime began at 5 am, at which time he said he would normally "be crawling back into my coffin".

Several of the film's actors had previously appeared in the Star Trek franchise. Bruce French, who portrayed Son'a Officer Number 1, appeared as Sabin Genestra in The Next Generation episode "The Drumhead" and as the Ocampa doctor in the Voyager pilot episode. Son'a Officer Number 3 was played by Joseph Ruskin, who appeared in four episodes across the Star Trek franchise: The Original Series episode "The Gamesters of Triskelion", and the Deep Space Nine episodes "Improbable Cause" and "Looking for par'Mach in All the Wrong Places" and the Voyager episode "Gravity". McKenzie Westmore, daughter of make-up supervisor Michael Westmore, played a Ba'ku woman. She previously appeared as a child in The Next Generation season one episode "When the Bough Breaks" and as Ensign Jenkins in the Voyager episode "Warhead". Scenes cut from the film would have featured two of the actors who played Ferengi on Deep Space Nine: Max Grodénchik, more familiar as Rom, was to have appeared as a Trill in the library scene. Armin Shimerman filmed a scene in his role as Quark, in which he tries to set up timeshares on the Ba'ku planet at the end of the film.

== Production ==
=== Development and writing ===
Following the success of Star Trek: First Contact, Paramount Pictures wanted a change of pace and a lighter tone for the follow-up film. Because Star Trek IV: The Voyage Home is light in tone, yet was the most successful of all the Star Trek films at the box office as of then, Paramount reasoned that this success could be repeated with the new film. Michael Piller was asked to write the script, and accepted the position. Piller wished to escape the development hell his other projects were stuck in. He wanted to give the crew a feeling of family, with a story featuring overtones of the Joseph Conrad novel Heart of Darkness. Rick Berman wanted to see Picard undertake a rescue mission in a similar manner to the 1937 film The Prisoner of Zenda. Berman also originated an idea to have Picard kidnapped, and replaced with a surgically modified imposter. Piller doubted Berman's idea, reasoning that the audience would not want to see an entire film in which Picard is not the lead star—the character would look like Patrick Stewart, but would be different. A further idea from Berman would have seen the return of Lore, last seen in the episode "Descent", in a film which was described as similar in tone to Star Trek II: The Wrath of Khan.

Piller initially thought to write a Fountain of Youth-type story, later saying: "Everybody's consumed with images of youth. There's commercials, plastic surgery — our culture seems obsessed with youth." He called the initial treatment "Heart of Lightness". Piller's first draft treatment for the film was titled Star Trek: Stardust, taken from the 1927 song "Stardust" by Hoagy Carmichael after hearing Nat King Cole's version on the radio. The treatment featured Picard resigning from Starfleet after he is sent to retrieve a population and their youth-giving power, and bring them to an alien government, and included a betrayal by Picard's rogue colleague. The draft went through several versions with only the crew's mission and the Briar Patch — named after the area from the Br'er Rabbit stories — remaining. Berman suggested that Data become the renegade crew-member that Picard must deal with. The plot was similar to the episode "Homeward" in that a people were being relocated through use of a holodeck. The use of a duck blind to observe cultures was previously used in the episode "Who Watches the Watchers".

In one draft, Picard kills Data early in the film, and the android is later resurrected to help the Captain in the finale. The first two drafts featured the Romulans as the antagonists, since they had never prominently appeared in a Star Trek film. The second draft was seen by Jonathan Dolgen at the studio; Dolgen was not pleased, and Patrick Stewart thought that it would have been only suitable for a TV episode. In the third draft, the Son'a were introduced as the children of the Ba'ku and the alien race that wanted to plunder the planet. That version also included the crew subplots, such as the Troi-Riker romance and the regeneration of La Forge's eyes. Stewart, concerned that the film was a step back in scope from First Contact, was consulted on the treatments.

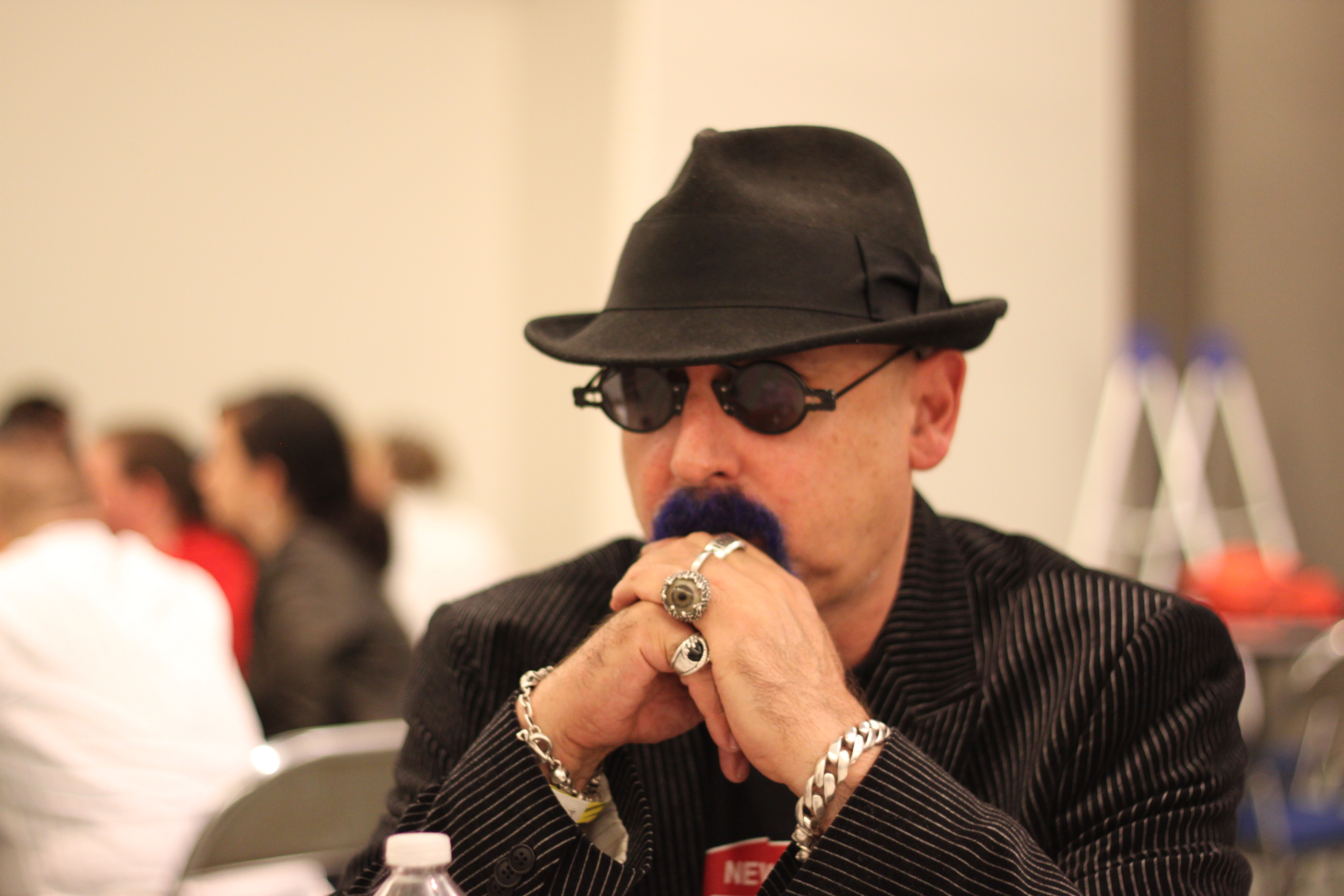
Ira Steven Behr (pictured) reviewed the first script at Michael Piller's request.

Piller drafted the first version of the script and asked Ira Steven Behr, executive producer of Star Trek: Deep Space Nine, to review it. Behr was critical of the script, describing the Son'a as "paper tigers". Piller said that "I knew he was right. There's no question that first draft was trying to tell two stories, and that's one too many for a movie." Piller re-drafted the script, adding a romantic subplot for Picard in the shape of Anij, a Ba'ku woman. He added gravitas to the Son'a to make them more menacing, and the ending was changed to include a massive Son'a collector ship and a confrontation between Picard and Ru'afo aboard the ship. A version of the script was subsequently leaked onto the internet. At the same time, Piller and Berman were exploring titles for the film, including Prime Directive, The Directive, The Resignation, The Enemy Within, Breach of Promise, Dereliction of Duty and Apostasy, because, they reasoned, that they could not submit it to the studio under the title of Stardust. They could not settle on a title, so they submitted it as Star Trek IX.

The studio was pleased with the post-Behr version of the script, which was the first version they saw, having previously only seen pre-script treatments. In a memo to Piller, it was described as "easily the funniest and sexiest Star Trek story to date". They gave Piller several requests, including a resolution to the Troi and Riker romance and for the character of Reginald Barclay to be replaced with expanded roles either for Beverly Crusher, Worf, or a new character.

Patrick Stewart sought a change to the script to have the crew defend the Ba'ku village like the Battle of the Alamo instead of fleeing into the mountains. Piller could not find a feasible way to include this in the script, and the budget ruled out creating Alamo-like structures in the mountains. Several titles were considered for the film as shooting approached. Star Trek: Where Time Stands Still, Star Trek: Forever and Star Trek: Beyond Paradise were all considered but were rejected. Piller's favorite was Star Trek: Sacred Honor, but the studio rejected this because they were concerned that it sounded too religious. When shooting began, the film was still called Star Trek IX.

The final version of the script was distributed to the cast, but Patrick Stewart did not receive a copy. Berman was concerned that if anyone had a problem with it, they would call Stewart to complain, and it would appear as though Stewart was being left out because he had criticized the story. LeVar Burton called Stewart to praise the script. Stewart was sent a copy and requested a meeting to discuss changes. Piller feared the worst, but after a twenty-minute meeting with Stewart, who requested several dialogue changes, the script was finalized. During pre-production, the marketing department wanted to decide a title, preferring Star Trek: Revolution. Alan Spencer, a friend of Piller, suggested Insurrection, which was selected from a choice of Insurrection, Rebellion, High Treason and Act of Treason.

After filming was complete, test screenings were held, and the production team became aware of a problem with the ending. In the original ending, Ru'afo is ejected into space from the Son'a collector ship and de-ages rapidly as he floats amongst the rings of the planet Ba'ku. Test audience members found this climax underwhelming, and some weren't even sure that Ru'afo had died. The revised ending saw the Enterprise swoop in at the last minute to save Picard while the collector ship explodes with Ru'afo aboard. The studio liked the new ending but wanted a bigger space battle. The production team agreed providing they could postpone the release to allow enough time for this. Because the studio wanted Insurrection to be released in time for Christmas, no further revisions were made to the ending.

Piller would agree to write a book about the making of Insurrection and the writing process for Pocket Books. They hired Eric A. Stillwell as Piller's typist and research assistant (he was also Piller's executive assistant and script coordinator). The book, however, went unpublished, and it was alleged that Paramount Pictures suppressed it due to its portrayal of the development process. Following Piller's death in 2005, the book, titled Fade In, was published online for free.

=== Costumes and make-up ===
Make-up supervisor Michael Westmore aimed to create a look for the Son'a that was not exaggerated. He consulted several sculptors; Dean Jones, who was on the production staff for Star Trek: Deep Space Nine, created the look. The prosthetics for Ru'afo consisted of overlapping layers that were stretched over Abraham's head. Westmore said Abraham's prosthetics was "like a rubber band, F. Murray Abraham could turn his head and the skin would look translucent. It was so thin, and the layers were pulling on each other." The two other aliens on the Son'a vessels also had specific prosthetic make-up designs created. The Tarlac's look was based on reptilian skin, while the Ellora required only nose and forehead prosthetics.

Costume designer Robert Blackman got an opportunity to address issues with the Starfleet dress uniforms, which Blackman had changed on several occasions during The Next Generation. The uniforms appeared for the first time in the episode "Lonely Among Us", and were based on the 18th century designs for the Royal Navy. For Insurrection, Blackman initially thought of creating a uniform with short jackets in blue, red and gold, which he later said was "not a good idea". His eventual design minimized the use of division-specific colors. Blackman said, "No matter what, white over black has a formal look to it." Sanja Milkovic Hayes created the remaining new costumes for the film. She avoided making the Ba'ku look too cute, and used material made from cellulose fiber specifically created for Insurrection. She said it was organic, and was simply cooked and then glued together. The Son'a costumes were made from layers of crushed velvet and metal strips. The female bodysuits were made of latex; Hayes wanted them to appear "sexy, but not vulgar" and described the outfits as "very conservative".

=== Design and visual effects ===
Insurrection was the first Star Trek film with space-based effects produced entirely using computer-generated imagery (CGI). While CGI had been used for specific effects since The Wrath of Khan; Insurrection was the first Star Trek film to be made without using physical models of spacecraft. Santa Barbara Studios produced the effects, which included CGI starship models. The texture on the model of the Enterprise-E was created from a series of close-up photographs of the model Enterprise which had been used in First Contact. The planet-based effects, such as phaser fire, transporter effects and the Son'a drones were created by Blue Sky Studios. Peter Lauritson was the co-producer for post-production.

Herman Zimmerman was the production designer and had three months to design and construct 55 full sets for the film, 18 more than the previous film in the series. Zimmerman said that it was "probably the most scenery we've built for a Star Trek motion picture since the first one, when everything was brand new". The Ba'ku village was built in full scale on location at Lake Sherwood, California, with architectural designs combining Thai, Balinese and Polynesian styles. The village included a bakery, a farm with a full irrigation system, a city hall, and a city square which was referred to as the "rotunda". The location shoot lasted for six weeks. The buildings included sections built with styrofoam, which were cut out using computer aided design and computer-aided manufacturing techniques. These were covered in hardcoat to make them look as though they were made from stone, but they were not made waterproof. The set suffered water damage after record rainfall in the spring of 1998. The foam warped as it dried out in the sun, delaying shooting while repairs were made.

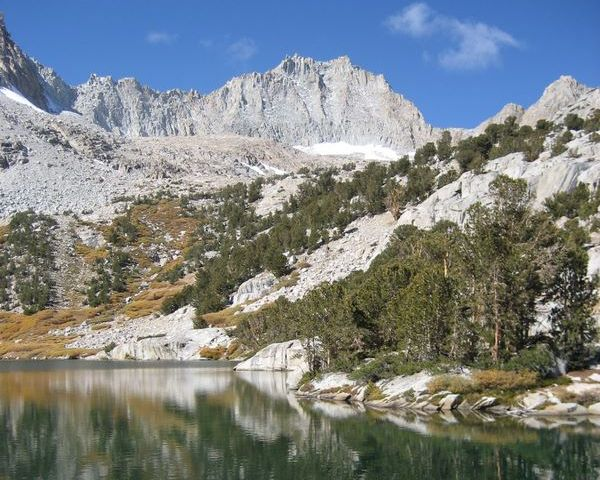
The Sierra Nevada portrayed the mountains of Ba'ku.

Sets built for use in Star Trek: Voyager were redressed to appear as the Enterprise-E in Insurrection; Captain Janeway's quarters became Picard's, the Voyager briefing room became Riker's quarters, and part of the Voyager engineering set became the Enterprise library. The interior of the scoutship flown by Data was originally the cockpit of the Voyager's shuttlecraft, while the interior of the Enterprise shuttlecraft used the interior set from a Star Trek: Deep Space Nine runabout. Filming began on March 31, 1998, and ended on July 2. According to Frakes, half of the time shooting was spent on location. The scenes in which the Enterprise crew and the Ba'ku take refuge in the mountains were shot on location above Lake Sabrina in the Sierra Nevada, which could only be reached by helicopter. The location was around 10,000 feet (3,000 m) above sea level, and a medic was on standby with oxygen if the cast or crew required it.

After filming, parts of the interior sets of the So'na ships were added using CGI. Stage 15 on the Paramount lot was used for the climactic scene between Picard and Ru'afo. Because of the dangers of the four-story scaffolding-like set, the actors were attached by safety cables at all times. Paramount's B tank, which was used to represent San Francisco Bay in Star Trek IV: The Voyage Home, was used to shoot footage of Picard, Data and Anij at the Ba'ku lake. For a scene in which Data walks along a lake bed, the actor's tricorder prop was covered with plastic to make it watertight.

=== Music ===
The score for Insurrection was composed by Jerry Goldsmith; his fourth score for the franchise. Goldsmith continued using the march and Klingon themes written for Star Trek: The Motion Picture in 1979, adding new themes and variations. Insurrection opens with Alexander Courage's Star Trek: The Original Series fanfare, introducing a six-note motif used in many of the film's action sequences. The Ba'ku are scored with a pastoral theme with repeating harps, string sections and a woodwind solo. The Ba'ku's ability to slow time was accompanied with a variation of this music.

Goldsmith used quick bursts of brass music to accompany the starship sequences. For scenes in which observers are watching the Ba'ku unseen, Goldsmith used a "spying theme" that resembles his conspiracy theme from Capricorn One. Composed of a piano, timpani percussion, and brass, the theme builds until it is interrupted by the action theme as Data opens fire. Goldsmith did not write a motif for the Son'a, but scored the action sequence without designating the Son'a as an antagonist, suggesting the film's revelation that the Son'a and Ba'ku are related. The film's climax is scored with the action theme, which is balanced with "sense of wonder" music similar to cues from The Motion Picture.

One scene in the film shows Patrick Stewart and Brent Spiner conducting a duet of "A British Tar" from the Gilbert and Sullivan comic-opera H.M.S. Pinafore. This replaced the original idea of Picard and Data reciting scenes from Shakespeare's play King Lear. Stewart had suggested that they sing "Three Little Maids from School Are We" from The Mikado instead, but the producers described this as "too vulgar". Stewart and Spiner had previously sung together on Spiner's 1991 album Ol' Yellow Eyes Is Back.

In 2013, GNP Crescendo Records re-released the soundtrack for the film as an expanded collector's edition [GNPD 8082], featuring previously unreleased tracks by Goldsmith plus four bonus tracks.

== Reception ==
=== Release ===
The world premiere of Insurrection launched the 1998 CineVegas film festival. It went on general release in the U.S. and Canada on December 11, 1998. The film grossed $22.4 million over the opening weekend; the most of any film during that period. It averaged a total of $8,417 per location across 2,620 theaters, but fell short of the opening weekend takings of both First Contact and Generations, which were $30.7 million and $23.1 million respectively.

Insurrection was the highest-grossing film during the first week of its release in the United States, beating A Bug's Life, and stayed in the top ten for a further three weeks. During its first week of release in the UK, it was the highest-grossing film, exceeding the takings of the Will Smith film Enemy of the State. Insurrection enjoyed a two-week spell at the top of the UK box office and eventually earned £7,429,398, roughly the same as Generations. It went on to gross $70,187,658 in the US and $47,612,342 in other countries for a total of $117,800,000 worldwide against a $70 million budget. It was the first Star Trek film to be promoted through the official website, which was called the "Star Trek Continuum" at the time. Following the success of the film, Rick Berman said that he wanted to release the next film in the series three years after Insurrection. Referencing Stanley Kubrick's 2001: A Space Odyssey, he said: "The notion of releasing a science fiction film in the year 2001 is very seductive."

=== Critical response ===
The critical response to Insurrection was mixed. Review aggregation website Rotten Tomatoes gave the film a score of 55% based on 67 reviews, with critic consensus being that, "Although not terrible, the sluggishly paced Insurrection plays like an extended episode of the TV series." On Metacritic the film has a score of 64 out of 100, based on reviews from 19 critics, indicating "generally favorable reviews". Audiences surveyed by CinemaScore gave the film a grade B+.

The Los Angeles Daily News said that the film had the "bare bones of one of those pseudo-philosophical political allegories Trek has always done so entertainingly. But the movie blows it." It praised the directing of Jonathan Frakes and the computer generated special effects and gave the film two and a half stars overall. The Daily Herald also gave the film two and a half stars, describing it as a "slickly made" movie with a plot "scaled down to its TV roots", and criticized the "frivolous" romance between Riker and Troi. The Washington Times gave the film one and a half stars, saying that it was "consistently flat-footed and slow on the uptake", and that there was "ramshackle confusion during the climactic scenes".

The Scottish Daily Record praised F. Murray Abraham and described Anthony Zerbe as "ever-dependable". It said the plot was good, but that it was simply an extended episode of The Next Generation, and gave it a score of six out of ten. The British newspaper The People also said it was an extended television episode.

The Independent said that Insurrection "never stops being familiarly jolly and antiquated", and called the entire Star Trek film franchise "old-fashioned". The Washington Post also called the film old-fashioned, but "in the best sense of the word", and said that the film did what the "doctor – make that Dr. 'Bones' McCoy – ordered". British journalist Simon Rose, writing for The Daily Mirror was more critical of the film, saying that it failed to break the odd-numbered Star Trek film curse, and that it was "feeble", "moribund" and "tedious". However, Josh Spiegel writing for The Buffalo News said that Insurrection broke the odd-numbered film rule. Further criticism came from the Birmingham Evening Mail, which said that it was "an adult form of entertainment equivalent to Teletubbies for babies", and that there were "lots of repetition, rubbery faces, gibberish dialogue, characters leaping up and down in funny suits and some very basic effects". The reviewer gave the film two stars for fans, and none for non-fans. In Folklore/Cinema: Popular Film as Vernacular Culture, the actions of Data and the Ba'ku child Artim in Insurrection are seen as "a metamorphosis motif where a child becomes computerlike and a computer/android becomes more childlike". Data specifically "is a metaphor for a child who seeks to understand what being human means and then, like the velveteen rabbit, wishes to become. From confronting his father and evil brother to finding his mother, Data also represents the potential within all of us to quest for a fuller humanity".

=== Accolades ===
The film was nominated for the Saturn Award for Best Science Fiction Film at the 25th Saturn Awards; the prize was shared by Armageddon and Dark City. In 1999, it was nominated for the Hugo Award for Best Dramatic Presentation, which went to The Truman Show. It was nominated for Best Family Feature Film: Drama at the 20th Youth in Film Awards and won the individual award for Best Performance in a Feature Film: Supporting Young Actor for Michael Welch.

== Home media ==
The first home media release of the film was made simultaneously on VHS, Laserdisc and DVD on May 11, 1999, in the United States, and outside the US on VHS later that year. The film was released on June 5, 2000, in the United Kingdom, and was one of the first titles to be released on DVD by Paramount Home Entertainment International in Europe and Japan.

A video game which followed up on the events of Insurrection was released in 2000. Entitled Star Trek: Hidden Evil, it was set nine months after the events depicted in the film. In its narrative, a Son'a colony has been created on Ba'ku, and an archaeological discovery which shares similarities with The Next Generation episode "The Chase" is made. The game was developed by Presto Studios and published by Activision.

An Insurrection "Special Collector's Edition" two-disc set was released in 2005 at the same time as three other Next Generation films and Star Trek: Enterprise's fourth season, marking the first time that every film and episode of the franchise was available on home video. The film was presented with the same technical specifications as the previous release and a new DTS soundtrack, but it shipped without an audio commentary. The DVD includes a text track by Michael and Denise Okuda that provides production trivia and relevant facts about the Star Trek universe. The second disc contains six "making-of" videos, including one about the construction of the Ba'ku village and one about Michael Westmore's make-up designs for the film.

As part of a collection of Star Trek: The Next Generation films, Insurrection was released on Blu-ray and DVD on September 22, 2009. The Blu-ray transfer is presented in 1080p high definition enhanced for widescreen television and features 5.1 Dolby TrueHD audio in English, French and Spanish. The release also contains "Creating the Illusion" featurettes and new commentary by Jonathan Frakes and Marina Sirtis. The four Next Generation feature films were released on Ultra HD Blu-ray on April 4, 2023, in standalone and collected formats.

== See also ==
- Star Trek film series
- List of films featuring extraterrestrials
- "Remember" (Star Trek: Voyager)
