= Jeri Taylor =

American screenwriter (1938–2024)

- Born: Jeri Cecile Suer; June 30, 1938; Evansville, Indiana, U.S.
- Died: October 24, 2024 (aged 86); Davis, California, U.S.
- Education: Indiana University Bloomington; Cal State Northridge (MA)
- Occupations: Television scriptwriter; producer
- Known for: Star Trek: The Next Generation; Star Trek: Voyager
- Spouses: Dick Enberg (m. 1959; div. 1973) David Moessinger (m. 1986)
- Children: 3, including Alexander Enberg

Jeri Cecile Suer (June 30, 1938 – October 24, 2024), known professionally as Jeri Taylor, was an American television scriptwriter and producer who wrote many episodes of the Star Trek: The Next Generation and Star Trek: Voyager series.

== Early life ==
Taylor was born Jeri Cecile Suer in Evansville, Indiana, on June 30, 1938. She graduated from Indiana University Bloomington, where she was a member of Kappa Alpha Theta. Taylor also earned her M.A. in English from California State University, Northridge in 1966.

== Star Trek screenwriting ==
Taylor wrote scripts for television series, including Little House on the Prairie and The Incredible Hulk, then served as a producer and director on Quincy, M.E. and Jake and the Fatman. While working on the latter, Taylor and her producer partner David Moessinger hired J. Michael Straczynski as an executive story consultant, giving the future creator of Babylon 5 his first experience working on an hour-long show. Taylor was recommended to the producers of Star Trek: The Next Generation by Lee Sheldon, with whom she had worked on Quincy.

Taylor joined The Next Generation staff at the beginning of the fourth season as a supervising producer, co-writing the second episode to go into production, "Suddenly Human". After two years, Taylor became co-executive producer with Rick Berman and Michael Piller and served as executive producer/showrunner for the (final) seventh season of The Next Generation. During this time, she received credit on a number of episodes, including Wil Wheaton's final episode as a regular character, "Final Mission"; "The Wounded" that introduced the Cardassian race, which featured heavily in Star Trek: Deep Space Nine; the first of a two part episode featuring Spock, "Unification", and the script she has said she was most proud of, "The Drumhead".

During the last year of The Next Generation, Taylor worked with Rick Berman and Michael Piller to develop the fourth Star Trek series, Star Trek: Voyager. When The Next Generation production ended, Taylor transferred to the Voyager production staff and served as executive producer with Rick Berman during the first four years. At the beginning of the third season, when Piller moved to a reduced creative consultant role, Taylor became head of the writing staff (showrunner) and stayed in that role until the end of the fourth season in 1998, when she retired and handed over control of the writing staff to Brannon Braga. Despite retiring, she continued to work with the Voyager team as creative consultant during the show's last three seasons.

During her time on The Next Generation and Voyager, Taylor wrote three Star Trek novels for Pocket Books: a novelization of "Unification" that she wrote at the same time she was scripting its first part, and two Voyager novels that expanded on the background of the characters she had helped create for the series.

Between the years 1995 to 1998, Taylor gave the Indiana University Lilly Library a collection of her screenwriting work including outlines, scripts for the Next Generation series and for the first two Voyager seasons, technical notes, cast lists, and shooting schedules for the final season of The Next Generation (1993–1994), casting call sheets and research notes for Voyager (1994–1996). Some of the outlines, technical notes, and lists contain Taylor's handwritten changes and comments.

== Personal life and death ==
Taylor married Dick Enberg in 1959, and together they had three children, including Alexander Enberg. After she and Enberg divorced, she married her old producer partner David Moessinger in 1986. Taylor and Moessinger lived for many years at The Sea Ranch, California. Taylor was very involved with The Sea Ranch Thespians.

Taylor died at an assisted-living facility in Davis, California, on October 24, 2024, at the age of 86.

== Bibliography ==
- Taylor, Jeri (1991). Unification. Pocket Books. ISBN 0-671-77056-X.
- Taylor, Jeri (1996). Mosaic. Pocket Books. ISBN 0-671-56311-4.
- Taylor, Jeri (1998). Pathways. Pocket Books. ISBN 0-671-00346-1.
