= Michael Piller =

American television producer and scriptwriter (1948–2005)

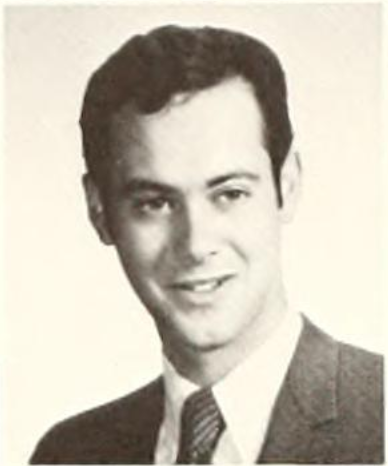
- Piller c. 1969-1970
- Born: May 30, 1948; Port Chester, New York, US
- Died: November 1, 2005 (aged 57); Los Angeles, California, US
- Resting place: Forest Lawn Memorial Park
- Education: University of North Carolina at Chapel Hill
- Occupations: Television producer, writer
- Spouse: Sandra Piller (m. 1981)
- Children: 3

Michael Piller (May 30, 1948 – November 1, 2005) was an American television scriptwriter and producer, who was best known for his contributions to the Star Trek franchise.

== Early life and career ==
Piller was born to a Jewish family in Port Chester, New York. His parents were both involved in writing; Gene Piller, his father, was a Hollywood screenwriter and his mother, Ruth Roberts, was a songwriter and composer. He planned to be a scriptwriter from an early age, but a college lecturer discouraged him, and Piller started out in television working as an Emmy Award-winning journalist for CBS News in New York, WBTV in Charlotte, North Carolina, and WBBM-TV in Chicago, Illinois. However, he then moved to Los Angeles, California and the entertainment side of television in the late 1970s, working as a censor and then a programming executive for CBS. While at the network, he became director of dramas based on fact and program practices. He began writing scripts for television, and after selling a script to Cagney & Lacey and another to Simon & Simon, he was offered a staff writing position on Simon & Simon, where he stayed for three years, becoming a producer.

Piller attended the University of North Carolina at Chapel Hill, where he was a member of the Pi Lambda Phi fraternity. He married Sandra in 1981; they had three children.

In 1987, together with Van Gordon Sauter, he developed a reality/medical series for MGM/UA Television called Group One Medical. He later teamed with him again in the following year on Hotline, a game-show designed to have interactive elements with the home audience.

== Star Trek ==
In 1989, a call to Maurice Hurley, a friend who had led the writing staff of Star Trek: The Next Generation through its second year, led to Piller co-writing an episode with Michael Wagner called "Evolution". When Wagner dropped out of leading the writing staff for the show's third year, Piller was invited to assume the showrunner position, reporting to executive producer Rick Berman, as of the fifth episode of the third season, "The Bonding". During the first two years of the series, the writing staff had been plagued by conflicts, with the staff continually changing as different writers came and went. Within a year, Piller had formed a strong writing team, something that had eluded previous executives. He also moved the focus away from "alien-of-the-week" or "situation-of-the-week" stories to ones that developed the main characters and their relationships, which many point to as the turning point for the series. Another key innovation was Piller's open-door policy for scripts, allowing anyone to submit story ideas. This policy yielded some of the series’ most popular episodes, including "Yesterday's Enterprise".

The Next Generation ran for seven years and garnered increasing critical recognition, culminating in an Emmy Award nomination in its final year for Outstanding Drama Series. Piller was personally responsible for many popular episodes, including "The Best of Both Worlds", Parts 1 & 2, which are frequently identified as the best episodes of The Next Generation, and the two-part fifth season "Unification", which saw the appearance of Spock, portrayed by Leonard Nimoy, who originated the role on the original Star Trek series.

In late 1991, when The Next Generation executive producer Rick Berman was asked by Paramount Pictures to create a new Star Trek series, he turned to Piller to help him create the new show. Star Trek: Deep Space Nine debuted in January 1993 with "Emissary", the pilot episode written by Piller, to the highest-ever ratings for a syndicated series premiere. Like The Next Generation, the series ran for seven years, with Piller serving as showrunner for its first two seasons.

He was succeeded as showrunner on The Next Generation by Jeri Taylor after the series’ fifth season. In 1994, Berman was again asked to create another new Star Trek series for Paramount's new UPN television network. As before, Berman teamed with Piller, developing Star Trek: Voyager along with Taylor. When Voyager began its first season, Piller transferred fully to Voyager and was replaced as showrunner on Deep Space Nine by Ira Steven Behr, who served as showrunner for that series' remaining years. Piller served as showrunner and head of the writing staff for Voyager's first two seasons, with Taylor serving as his deputy. Piller left Voyager and retired from the franchise after its second season with Taylor succeeding him for the third season. At the same time, Piller developed another series for UPN called Legend. the series was cancelled after only 12 episodes. Piller continued as a creative consultant on Deep Space Nine and Voyager, sending in notes on scripts as they were being prepared for production.

In 1993, Piller had been approached to write one of two prospective scripts for the first Next Generation feature film, with the other written by The Next Generation staff writers Ronald D. Moore and Brannon Braga but he declined. In 1997, he was approached again to write a Next Generation feature film, collaborating with Rick Berman to write Star Trek: Insurrection. While writing the treatment for this film, he documented the entire process in the book Fade In, though it remained unpublished. Following Piller's death in 2005, the book was published on the internet. His wife, Sandra, has subsequently sought to have the work published in bound form. She described in an interview in 2013 that the studio was surprised by his honesty about the writing process and production of Insurrection and paraphrased the response of the executives at Paramount Pictures, saying, "We can't let the public know what we do here; what goes on behind the scenes!"

== Post-Star Trek ==
In 1996, he sold his first feature film script, called Oversight. The script, set in a Congressional sub-committee, is about "the passing of control from one generation to the next", and was inspired by his relationship with his son Shawn, who had contributed scripts to The Next Generation and Voyager. As of 2022 the script has yet to be produced.

Piller formed a production company with Shawn in 1999 called Piller². They signed a two-year deal with the WB Television Network which covered one guaranteed production, along with three orders for pilots. The WB ordered scripts for all four productions, and looked to be moving ahead with Day One, a post-apocalyptic serial based on the UK television mini-series The Last Train. However, the series never went into production.

In 2001, Piller was approached by producer Lloyd Segan to adapt Stephen King's novel The Dead Zone for television. The series, co-developed with Shawn and starring Anthony Michael Hall and Deep Space Nine's Nicole de Boer, debuted June 16, 2002 on USA Network with 6.4 million viewers, the biggest premiere ever on that channel. Viewership remained steady through four seasons, before a dip in ratings saw it canceled in its sixth season.

In 2005, Wildfire, another series that Piller² developed, debuted on the ABC Family channel. The show ended in 2008 after four seasons.

== Death and legacy ==
There is an empty space in my heart today. The world without Michael Piller is a diminished one. Michael's courage, determination, and amazing sense of humor during his ordeal of the last three years was inspirational. He was teacher, mentor, and guide to so many Star Trek writers that it can truly be said that he imprinted ST story telling in a way that will endure forever. He was a man of principle and character, a good and decent person who always tried to do what was right. I admired him; I respected him; I loved him. I will miss him.

— Jeri Taylor, Executive Producer - Star Trek: The Next Generation and Star Trek: Voyager, Co-Creator - Star Trek: Voyager

On November 1, 2005, StarTrek.com announced that Piller had succumbed to head and neck cancer and died at his home. Full page tributes to him were published in Variety and The Hollywood Reporter, while Lions Gate Television put out a press release describing him as, "an extraordinary storyteller and cherished friend, who inspired all of us who knew him." Tributes to him from several members of the cast and crew of Star Trek, as well as those from The Dead Zone, were published on the official Star Trek website.

He has been subsequently credited with giving The Next Generation its "soul" by Star Trek writer Paula Block, while Terry J. Erdmann felt that the complex characters of Deep Space Nine were entirely formed from Piller's imagination. Likewise, TNG cast member Wil Wheaton said that Piller was "more responsible than anyone else for Next Generation transforming itself into the amazing show it became in season four". Eric Stillwell, who worked as Piller's executive assistant on Insurrection and later became Vice President of Operations at Piller Squared, said that Piller's greatest gift was his ability to nurture new writers and help them develop their talent. He felt that this would be Piller's enduring legacy.
