= Peter Lauritson =

American actor

- Occupations: Producer and director
- Known for: Star Trek

Peter Lauritson is a long-time film producer and director and television producer and director who first became involved with the Star Trek franchise with Star Trek II: The Wrath of Khan. He went on to become a producer for Star Trek: The Next Generation, and supervising producer for Deep Space Nine, Voyager and Enterprise. He directed three episodes of those series, including the Hugo Award-winning "The Inner Light", as well as being second unit director for two Star Trek films.

== Biography ==
Lauritson was the head of the post-production department for television at Paramount Pictures in 1981 when Star Trek II: The Wrath of Khan was being produced by the television departments there. In 1986, he became involved in the development of Star Trek: The Next Generation where he became an associate producer. By the end of the seventh series, he had been promoted to a producer. Whilst working on The Next Generation, he made his directorial debut with the episode "The Inner Light" and went on to also direct the first episode of the two-part "Gambit". "The Inner Light" is regarded as one of the most acclaimed episodes of the series, and Lauritson accepted a Hugo Award for Best Dramatic Presentation in 1993, which was the first of two Hugo Awards to be won by the series. The episode was named the third best of the series by Entertainment Weekly in 2007.

Lauritson's face appears briefly as an image of Raymond Thomas on Counsellor Troi's computer screen as Troi helps Claire Raymond search for living descendants in the Star Trek: The Next Generation episode "The Neutral Zone".

Lauritson was one of the ten producers who were named in the Emmy Award nomination of The Next Generation for Outstanding Drama Series in 1994. He became a supervising producer on Star Trek: Deep Space Nine, Star Trek: Voyager and Star Trek: Enterprise. His third and final Star Trek directorial position was on the Voyager episode "Lineage". He was also co-producer on all The Next Generation films from Star Trek Generations through to Star Trek: Nemesis. He was the director of the second unit on both Star Trek: First Contact and Star Trek: Insurrection.

== Additional filmography ==
- Bigfoot and Wildboy (associate producer)
- The Mentalist (associate producer)
