= Rick Berman =

American television producer and screenwriter

- Born: Richard Keith Berman; December 25, 1945 (age 80); New York City, U.S.
- Education: University of Wisconsin, Madison
- Occupations: Television producer, writer
- Years active: 1977–2005
- Known for: Star Trek
- Spouse: Elizabeth Berman (m. 1980)
- Children: 3

Richard Keith Berman (born December 25, 1945) is an American television producer and screenwriter. He is best known for his work as the executive producer of several of the Star Trek television series: Star Trek: The Next Generation, Star Trek: Deep Space Nine, Star Trek: Voyager and Star Trek: Enterprise, as well as several of the Star Trek films, and for ultimately succeeding Gene Roddenberry as head of the Star Trek franchise until the cancellation of Star Trek: Enterprise in 2005.

== Early life and work ==
Berman was raised in New York City. He attended college at the University of Wisconsin–Madison, receiving a degree in English and film production in 1967. He first considered acting as a career, but decided not to pursue it because of the high degree of difficulty in gaining success. Starting a career as an independent film producer, director, and writer, he made documentaries and industrial films. Among his clients were the United Nations and the United States Information Agency. By 1977, he had traveled to over 90 countries making films for these organizations.

From 1977 to 1982, he was the senior producer of PBS' The Big Blue Marble, which won an Emmy Award for Outstanding Children's Series. Between 1982 and 1984, he was an independent producer, working on projects that included HBO's What on Earth and PBS' The Primal Mind. Berman joined Paramount in 1984 as the director of current programming, overseeing series such as Cheers and Family Ties. He was also executive director of dramatic programming, overseeing series such as the miniseries Space and the American Broadcasting Company (ABC) series MacGyver. He was promoted in 1986 to vice-president of long-form and special projects at Paramount Network Television.

== Star Trek ==
In 1987, Gene Roddenberry selected Berman and Maurice Hurley to help create Star Trek: The Next Generation. Initially, Berman shared supervising producer duties with Robert H. Justman. After Justman changed to consulting producer duties, Berman was promoted to co-executive producer. As Roddenberry's health declined, Berman took over more of the series' daily production. He was promoted to executive producer in the series' third season, following Hurley's departure. Berman wrote the TNG episodes "Brothers" and "A Matter of Time". In its final year, The Next Generation became the first syndicated television show to be nominated for the Best Dramatic Series Emmy.

During The Next Generation's penultimate season, Berman co-created Star Trek: Deep Space Nine with Michael Piller, marking the first time two Star Trek series ran concurrently. After The Next Generation completed its run, Berman co-created Star Trek: Voyager with Piller and Jeri Taylor. In 2001, he co-created Enterprise (retitled Star Trek: Enterprise in 2003) with Brannon Braga. During this same period, Berman was also lead producer on the four Next Generation feature films: Generations (1994), First Contact (1996), Insurrection (1998), and Nemesis (2002). Berman received both producer and story credit on all four films. Since the early 2000's, several writers of Star Trek material, such as David Gerrold and Andy Mangels, have criticized Berman's participation in removing and minimizing LGBT themes from multiple Star Trek series, including The Next Generation and Deep Space Nine. Berman has responded by saying that he took full responsibility for the lack of such characters and that he had been working with other producers on including gay characters, telling Kate Mulgrew that such a character would be included "in due time", though no such characters would be included during his time as producer.

In reviewing Nemesis, IGN's Oliver Glen argued that Berman and co-producer Braga seemed to be responsible for much of Star Trek no longer being "bold." Trek writer David Weddle believed that the "moribund aesthetics" of Berman were the "constrictions that slowly strangled the franchise." Berman specifically received criticism for his approach to dramatic musical scoring; composer Ron Jones claimed Berman "always considered music an intrusion." However, former Next Generation star Brent Spiner credits Berman with having "protected Gene Roddenberry's vision." Salon's Robert Wilonsky asserted that Berman deserves credit for producing hundreds of hours of popular programming, and that "without Berman to keep the show alive, there'd be no Berman to blame for the show's death."

In 2005, Berman was involved in developing an eleventh Star Trek movie based on a script written by Erik Jendresen. However, when Gail Berman (no relation) took over as president of Paramount Pictures, Jendresen's script was shelved. In subsequent months, Berman began hinting that his involvement with Star Trek was drawing to a close, stating in November that "when they re-energise the franchise it's going to be the result of someone fresh, someone who has not been extensively involved with Star Trek". In mid-2006, Berman stated he would no longer be involved in producing Star Trek. Since his departure, Berman has indicated he is still involved in television production, as well as projects "not connected to the television business." He also stated an interest in writing a memoir of his experiences on Star Trek.

== See also ==
- List of Star Trek production staff
