= USS Enterprise (NCC-1701-D) =

Fictional starship from Star Trek

- The USS Enterprise in "These Are the Voyages...", the 2005 series finale of Star Trek: Enterprise
- First appearance: "Encounter at Farpoint"; Star Trek: The Next Generation; 1987
- Last appearance: "The Last Generation"; Star Trek: Picard; 2023
- Created by: Andrew Probert

Information
- Affiliation: United Federation of Planets; Starfleet
- Launched: October 4, 2363
- Decommissioned: 2402 (Star Trek: Picard)
- Captain: Jean-Luc Picard; William Riker; Edward Jellico
- Auxiliary vehicles: Shuttlecraft; Captain's yacht

General characteristics
- Class: Galaxy
- Registry: NCC-1701-D
- Armaments: Phasers; Photon torpedoes
- Defenses: Deflector shields
- Maximum speed: Warp 9.65
- Propulsion: Impulse drive Warp drive
- Power: Matter/antimatter reaction

USS Enterprise (NCC-1701-D), or Enterprise-D, to distinguish it as the fifth Federation vessel with the same name and registry, is a fictional starship in the Star Trek media franchise. Under the command of Captain Jean-Luc Picard, it is the main setting of Star Trek: The Next Generation (1987–1994) and the film Star Trek Generations (1994). It has also been depicted in various spinoffs, films, books, and licensed products.

The Next Generation is set in the 24th century, beginning 94 years after the adventures in the original Star Trek (1966–1969). Andrew Probert's Enterprise-D updates Matt Jefferies' iconic 1960s Enterprise design, depicting a ship supporting a larger crew on a longer mission "to boldly go where no one has gone before."

== Development and production ==
=== Concept ===
Paramount Television Group and Star Trek creator Gene Roddenberry announced the development of a new Star Trek series in October 1986. Because the Enterprise had been "just as important to [the original Star Trek] as Kirk, Spock, and McCoy," the new ship was critical.

Whereas Captain Kirk led a five-year mission, the new crew would be outfitted for a mission of at least 10 years. To sustain such a journey, the new vessel would be twice as long, eight times the volume, and include the crew's families. Roddenberry also wanted the ship to depict an improved quality of life for its crew: it would be brighter, less militaristic, and have sleeker and more refined interfaces than the original Enterprise. He wanted the Enterprise to convey a harmony between science and quality of life.

The Enterprise's registry was originally NCC-1701-7. The last 7 became a G to be consistent with the designation for the new USS Enterprise, with registry NCC-1701-A, at the conclusion of Star Trek IV: The Voyage Home (1986). A February 1987 revision to the Next Generation writers' manual specified the show's Enterprise as the NCC-1701-D, carrying a crew of 907 and their families; by March, the crew complement was 1,012 and specified the show occurring 94 years after the original Star Trek.

=== Design ===
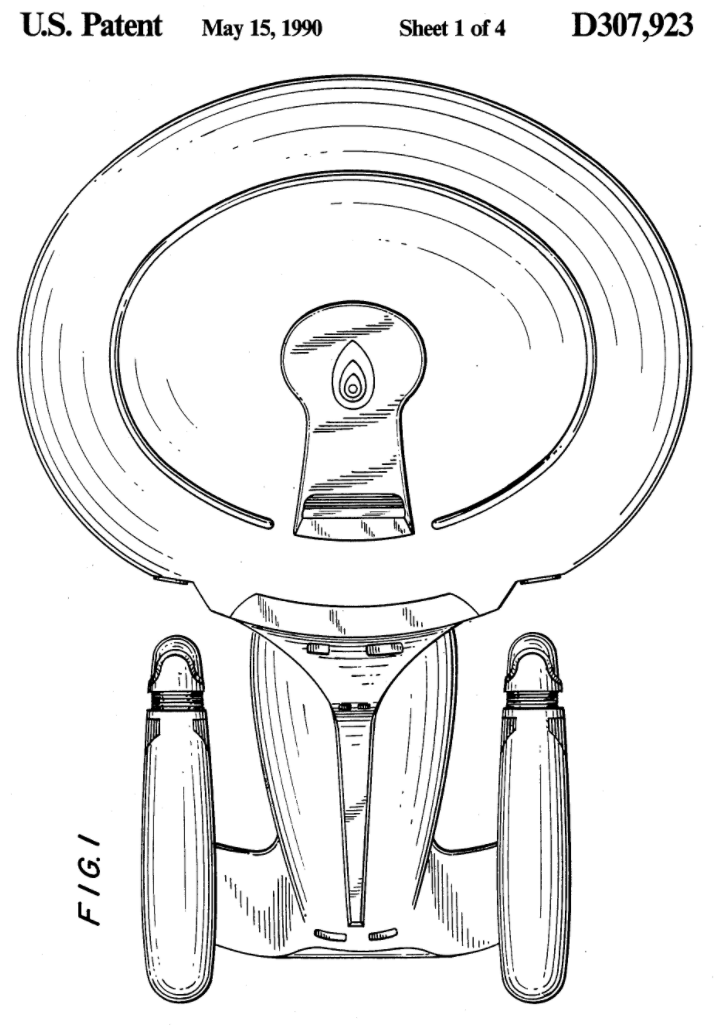
Andrew Probert submitted this art to the United States Patent and Trademark Office for a "toy spaceship" in the likeness of the Enterprise. The illustration shows the top of the ship. The patent was awarded in 1990.

Artists Andrew Probert, Rick Sternbach, and Michael Okuda were among the earliest Next Generation hires, and they had worked on Star Trek films. Probert, a concept artist, focused first on the bridge because that would be a frequent filming location. Roddenberry envisioned the bridge as having a conference table and a forward viewscreen four times larger than the one in Star Trek. As production design continued, the bridge was opened up and the table was moved to an adjacent conference room. Probert proposed to put a transporter near the bridge, but Roddenberry set it further away so characters could have conversations on their way to the transporter room.

Knowing the bridge would need to match the exterior design, Probert pinned up a "what if?" painting he'd made shortly after finalizing the Enterprise redesign for 1979's Star Trek: The Motion Picture . Unbeknownst to Probert, story editor David Gerrold took the image to a producers meeting. The producers liked the design and directed Probert to make it the basis for the new vessel. The sleeker lines and rounded contours that informed the interior design also influenced the exterior. The ship's many windows are meant to allow the crew to be in touch with their environment.

The new Enterprise retains the hallmarks of Matt Jefferies' design for the original Enterprise: a saucer section, engineering section, and a pair of engine nacelles. Probert did this in part to assuage skeptical fans who were concerned about the original Enterprise being "replaced". The design shifted placement and proportion: for example, the saucer section was enlarged and the warp nacelles lowered. Slanting the nacelle support pylons forward conveyed a sense of intense forward movement. The first public depictions of the ship appeared in the July 1987 issue of Starlog.

Probert's design did not originally include the ability for the saucer and engineering sections to separate, and producers rejected his initial concepts for incorporating it. Probert said his biggest design challenge was creating a ship that looked as good in two pieces as it did in one piece. He had meant to add landing gear to the saucer's underside as he had with the film franchise Enterprise, but he got "distracted" and never added them.

=== Sets ===
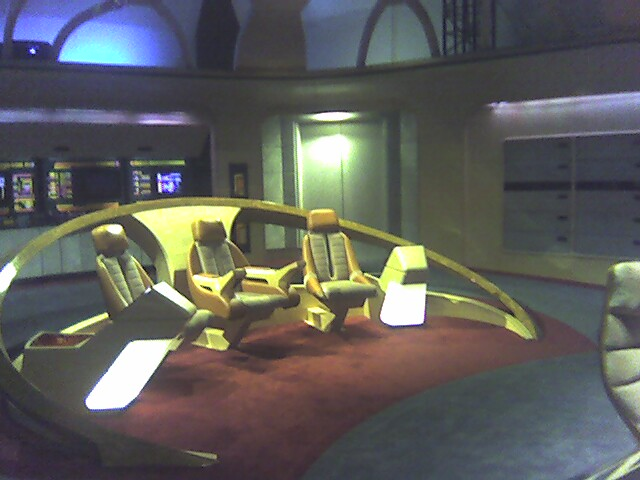
The main bridge was replicated for Star Trek: The Exhibition. The Next Generation bridge set was just as wide and only two feet deeper than the original series' bridge set.

In October 1986, producers began planning the show's sets, including efforts to reuse props and materials from the film franchise. The films' engineering, sickbay, corridor, crew quarters, and bridge were redressed for The Next Generation. To save money in the first season, the observation lounge's windows were covered with carpet to become the sickbay; a new lounge set was created for the second season. A multipurpose set that served as the cargo bay, shuttlecraft bay, holodeck, and gymnasium was built from scratch. While the bridge "seems immense," the set had the same 38-foot (12 m) width as the original series bridge and was two feet (0.61 m) longer. A lounge set was created in unused soundstage space after the first season: producers realized their existing sets were workspaces, and they wanted an area to depict the crew at rest.

The production crew did everything "within reason" to recreate first-season sets and to imagine futuristic upgrades for the series finale, "All Good Things..." (1994), which presents the ship in three time periods. Some props and details, such as the first-season conference-room starship models, had been saved and were reused for the flashback scenes. Sets for the future scenes reused props from other episodes that set the Enterprise further in the future.

=== Filming models and visual effects ===
Producers were aware that audiences had grown accustomed to the cinematic quality of models and effects in the franchise's films. They considered using only CGI models and effects, but anxiety about whether the vendor could consistently deliver high-quality work led to that idea's rejection. The producers turned to Industrial Light & Magic (ILM), who had worked on the Star Trek films, for the "Encounter at Farpoint" pilot.

In March 1987, an ILM team led by Greg Jein and Ease Owyeung began building filming miniatures based on Probert's designs. They created two models for US$75,000 (equivalent to about $213,000 in 2025): a two-foot (0.61 m) model and a six-foot (1.8 m) model that separated into the saucer and engineering sections. The models were made of fiberglass and cast resin over aluminum frames, and neon lights and incandescents provided the models' interior lighting. ILM created several stock footage shots and effects, including the Enterprise's jump to warp. The warp jump was featured in the show's opening sequence, but most of the other shots were too static and "didn't pan out." New Enterprise shots were created as necessary for each episode, and effects supervisor Robert Legato had over 350 such shots in his library by the seventh season. Legato disliked filming the six-foot model: its size made it hard to shoot for long shots, and its lack of surface details—some of which were drawn with pencil—made it difficult to use in close-ups. Jein supervised construction of a four-foot (1.2 m) miniature for the third season that was more detailed than the first two.

=== Transition to film ===
The Enterprise's saucer section plummets into a planet's atmosphere in Star Trek Generations (1994). The crash landing sequence was inspired by an illustration in a technical manual for the show's writers.

Production designer Herman Zimmerman had more freedom for Star Trek Generations (1994) than he had on previous Star Trek films. Producers wanted to ensure Generations stayed true to the television series while also taking advantage of the film production's scope and budget. Interiors were relit and received several cosmetic changes, such as redesigned consoles, metallic accents, and replacing backlit displays with monitors. Some changes, like enhanced detailing and a redesigned bridge ceiling, were necessitated by the film cameras' higher resolution. The increased budget allowed for the creation of sophisticated new sets, such as the stellar cartography lab.

John Knoll led ILM's visual effects for the film, including an all-CGI warp jump effect for the Enterprise. ILM rewired and updated its six-foot Enterprise model for the saucer separation sequence. ILM made a twelve-foot (3.7 m) saucer section model to "crash" into an 80-foot (24 m) planet surface model. An 18-inch (460 mm) model of the saucer's forward edge was used for close-ups of the crashed ship.

=== Return in Star Trek: Picard ===
Despite resistance due to budget and time, Star Trek: Picard executive producer Terry Matalas insisted on the Enterprise appearing in the show's third season (2023): he said they could not "have a Star Trek: The Next Generation reunion without [...] the Enterprise." There was not much construction information available for production designer Dave Blass and art director Liz Kloczkowski to recreate the bridge set, and they created a wall of set photos and screen captures for reference. Blass hired Denise and Michael Okuda, from the Next Generation production team, to assist. Construction of the bridge set took three months and involved approximately 50 people. The large wooden arch in the middle of the bridge was the most difficult part of the build, but remaking the chairs and recreating the carpet was also challenging. Changes in cameras and cinematography required a new approach to lighting the set.

== Depiction ==
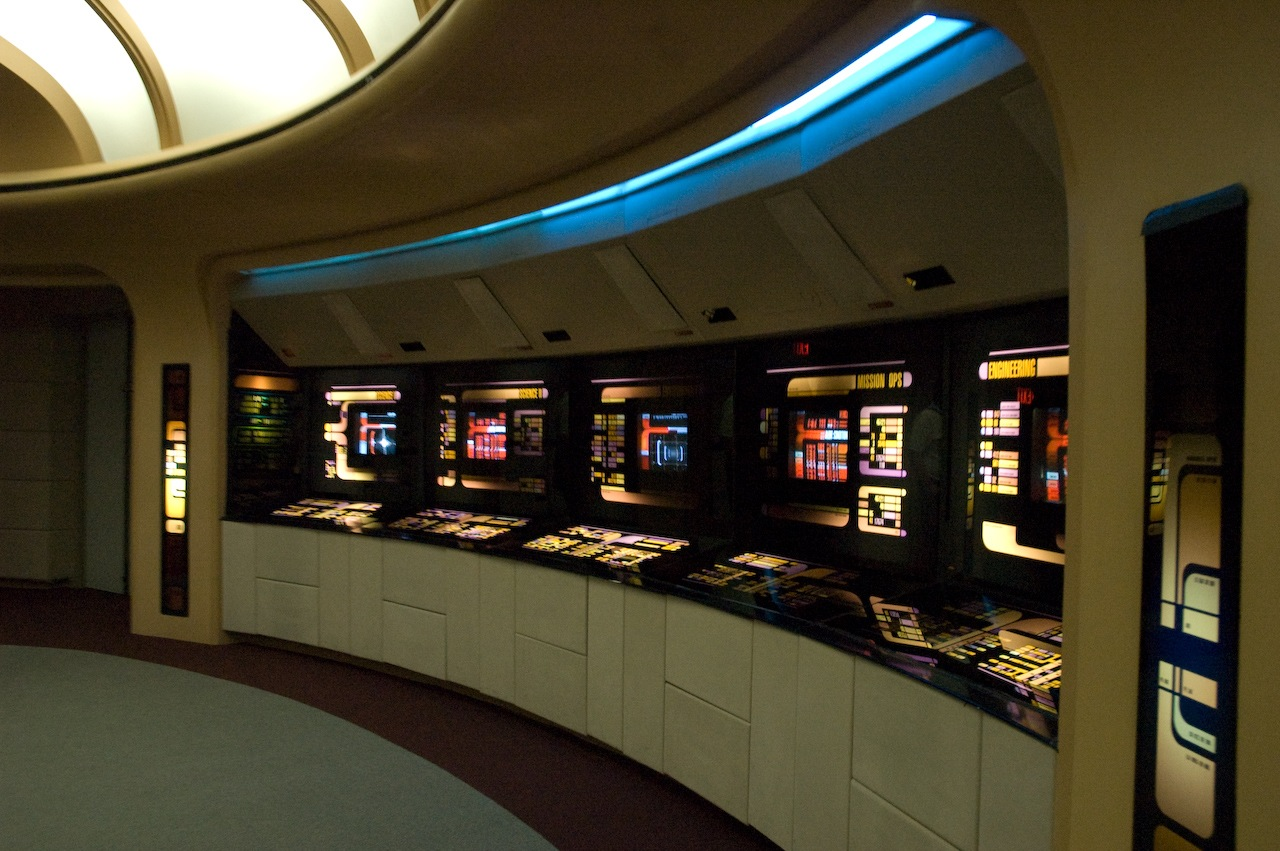
Bridge stations as seen at Star Trek Experience at the Las Vegas Hilton

The Enterprise is itself a protagonist in The Next Generation. Each episode's opening voiceover, which states that "these are the voyages of the starship Enterprise", frames the narrative as belonging to the ship rather than the crew. Jonathan Frakes, who played first officer William Riker, said, "When we negotiate our contracts, Paramount's company line is that the ship is in fact the star of the show!"

Starfleet commissions the Galaxy-class USS Enterprise in 2363 under the command of Captain Jean-Luc Picard. The flagship of the United Federation of Planets, it is on a mission "to boldly go where no one has gone before." The crew explores the galaxy and makes first contact with several new species, including the Q Continuum and the Borg. A pair of two-part episodes depict a change in command—to William Riker in "The Best of Both Worlds" and Edward Jellico in "Chain of Command"—but leadership reverts to Picard at the end of both arcs.

In 2371, as depicted in Star Trek Generations, the Duras sisters attack and heavily damage the Enterprise. A warp drive coolant leak causes an explosion that destroys the stardrive section. The saucer section crash lands on the surface of Veridian III. The final two episodes of Star Trek: Picard's third season (2023) reveal that the saucer section was later recovered from Veridian III, after which Geordi La Forge spent twenty years restoring the vessel as part of his role as curator of the Starfleet Museum. La Forge used parts from another Galaxy-class ship, the U.S.S Syracuse, to rebuild the Enterprise. The older Enterprise is the only Starfleet vessel not tied to a Borg-compromised mainframe, and Picard and his crew use the ship to defeat the Borg. The series finale shows the Enterprise has become part of the Starfleet Museum.

The Enterprise includes Ten Forward - located on deck ten in the forward section of the saucer - which is a bar and social venue for the crew.

== Critical reaction ==
io9 ranked the Enterprise-D as the fifth best version of the franchise's Enterprises, with Popular Mechanics calling it the third best and SyFy ranking it the second best. Space.com said the Enterprise's brief appearance is the highlight of the opening scene of Star Trek: Picard's first episode (2020). Vulture described the Enterprise's return in Picard's third season as "perfect", and Collider compared the crew's reunion on the bridge set to "a fever dream."

== Cultural impact ==
A model of the Enterprise at the Star Trek Experience in Las Vegas.

In October 2006, the six-foot (1.8 m) Enterprise model was auctioned at Christie's, along with other models, props, costumes, and set pieces from the Star Trek franchise. Its projected value was $25,000 to $35,000 (equivalent to about $40,000 to $56,000), but the final sale price was $576,000 (equivalent to about $920,000 in 2025)—the most expensive item in the auction.

The computer voice and conversational system on board the Starship Enterprise in science fiction TV series and movies, beginning with the original Star Trek series and Star Trek: The Next Generation, inspired the virtual assistant, Alexa.
