= Half a Life (Star Trek: The Next Generation) =

- Star Trek: The Next Generation episode
- Episode no.: Season 4 Episode 22
- Directed by: Les Landau
- Story by: Ted Roberts; Peter Allan Fields
- Teleplay by: Peter Allan Fields
- Cinematography by: Thomas F. Denove
- Production code: 196
- Original air date: May 6, 1991

Guest appearances
- Majel Barrett - Lwaxana Troi; Michelle Forbes - Dara; Terrence E. McNally - B'Tardat; Colm Meaney - Chief Miles O'Brien; David Ogden Stiers - Timicin; Carel Struycken - Mr. Homn

Episode chronology
← Previous "The Drumhead"	Next → "The Host"
- Star Trek: The Next Generation season 4

"Half a Life" is the 22nd episode of the fourth season of the American science fiction television series Star Trek: The Next Generation, the 96th episode overall. It was originally released on May 6, 1991, in broadcast syndication. The episode was the first of the series written by Peter Allan Fields, who later joined the writing staff. Director Les Landau said that "Half a Life" was a morality play about "how society deals with the elderly".

Set in the 24th century, the series follows the adventures of the Starfleet crew of the Federation starship Enterprise-D. In this episode, Lwaxana Troi (Majel Barrett) falls in love with Timicin (David Ogden Stiers), a Kaelon scientist who is attempting to test his theories of stellar ignition in the hopes of saving his world's dying star. The experiment fails, and Lwaxana encourages Timicin to continue his research, but as he is about to turn sixty years of age, he prepares instead for a ritual suicide. According to Timicin's cultural tradition, his people voluntarily choose euthanasia to prevent the aged from becoming a burden to the younger generation.

The cast praised the story and the expansion of the Lwaxana character. The episode received positive reviews, with critics noting the performances of Stiers and Barrett, their character's love story, and the changes to the Lwaxana character.

== Plot ==
The USS Enterprise takes aboard Deanna Troi's (Marina Sirtis) eccentric mother Lwaxana (Majel Barrett) and Dr. Timicin (David Ogden Stiers) of Kaelon II. Timicin is brought aboard to conduct an experiment, which he hopes will save his threatened home planet, as its sun is in a state of near-collapse. The Federation enlists the Enterprise to take Timicin to a sun in a similar state of decay to conduct experiments which may yield a method for saving the Kaelon system from destruction.

Upon arrival at their destination, the crew assists Timicin in modifying photon torpedoes to launch into the proxy sun, with the expectation that they will repair the damaged star and prove that the technique can be safely applied to the Kaelon sun. The torpedoes are fired and, although the experiment seems initially to work, the effect is short-lived and the star explodes. The Enterprise returns to Kaelon II. Timicin is crushed, and after some questioning by Lwaxana, he reveals that there are other things troubling him. Timicin tells Lwaxana that he is about to turn 60, and on Kaelon II, everyone who reaches that age performs the "Resolution", a required act of voluntary euthanasia. Lwaxana is outraged to learn of this and brings it to the attention of Captain Jean-Luc Picard (Patrick Stewart). Picard makes it clear to Lwaxana that due to the Prime Directive, he will not interfere in the planet's local affairs. Lwaxana tries to beam herself down to the planet to halt the process, but she is thwarted by Deanna, who comforts her.

After Lwaxana and Timicin spend an evening together, he tries to explain the custom of the Resolution. He tells her that a fixed age had to be selected by the Kaelons, because just randomly choosing a time to die would be heartless. Lwaxana finds the practice barbaric and refuses to accept the Kaelon tradition. She tells Timicin how a Beta-Zed woman on her planet successfully fought the tradition of wearing ornate wigs that contained live, captive animals. It only took one courageous woman to step forward and end this cruel tradition. Lwaxana also compares Timicin's plans to end his life with his research to save his star. If it is Timicin's time to die, Lwaxana argues, perhaps it is time for his star to die as well, so why should he continue to try to prevent it? Timicin thinks about what Lwaxana has told him.

Timicin's analysis of the failed test turns up some promising options, but if he follows through with the Resolution, no one will have his experience and knowledge to carry on his work to save his world. Concerned, Timicin requests asylum on the Enterprise so that he can renounce the Resolution and continue his research. B'Tardat (Terrence E. McNally), the Science Minister on Kaelon II, is outraged after learning of Timicin's request for asylum, and he sends up two warships to ensure that the Enterprise does not leave the system with Timicin on board. As Picard orders the bridge crew to analyze the offensive capabilities of the Kaelonian ships, Timicin realizes that his situation is not as simple as he had hoped, for his home planet will not accept any further reports from him, and he is told that even if he does find a solution, they will not accept it.

Dara (Michelle Forbes), Timicin's daughter, beams on board the Enterprise to insist that he return to Kaelon II and undergo the Resolution. She tells him that she cannot bear the thought of him being laid to rest anywhere but next to her mother and, although she loves him, she is ashamed of him. Timicin realizes that he is not the man to forge a cultural revolution, and agrees to return to Kaelon II. Lwaxana, despite her disagreement, realizes that Timicin's decision is his to make. As it is the custom for loved ones to be present at the Resolution, Lwaxana beams down to be with him at his side at the time of his death.

== Production ==
"Half a Life" was the first Star Trek credit for writer Peter Allan Fields, who would later co-write "The Inner Light" with Morgan Gendel before becoming a staff writer on Star Trek: The Next Generation during season five. Prior to writing the script, Fields reviewed "Haven" and "Manhunt", the two previous Lwaxana Troi episodes, but did not use them as references except to note Lwaxana's level of privilege. "I realized that you give her as much as they'll let her have. She'll take it", he explained.

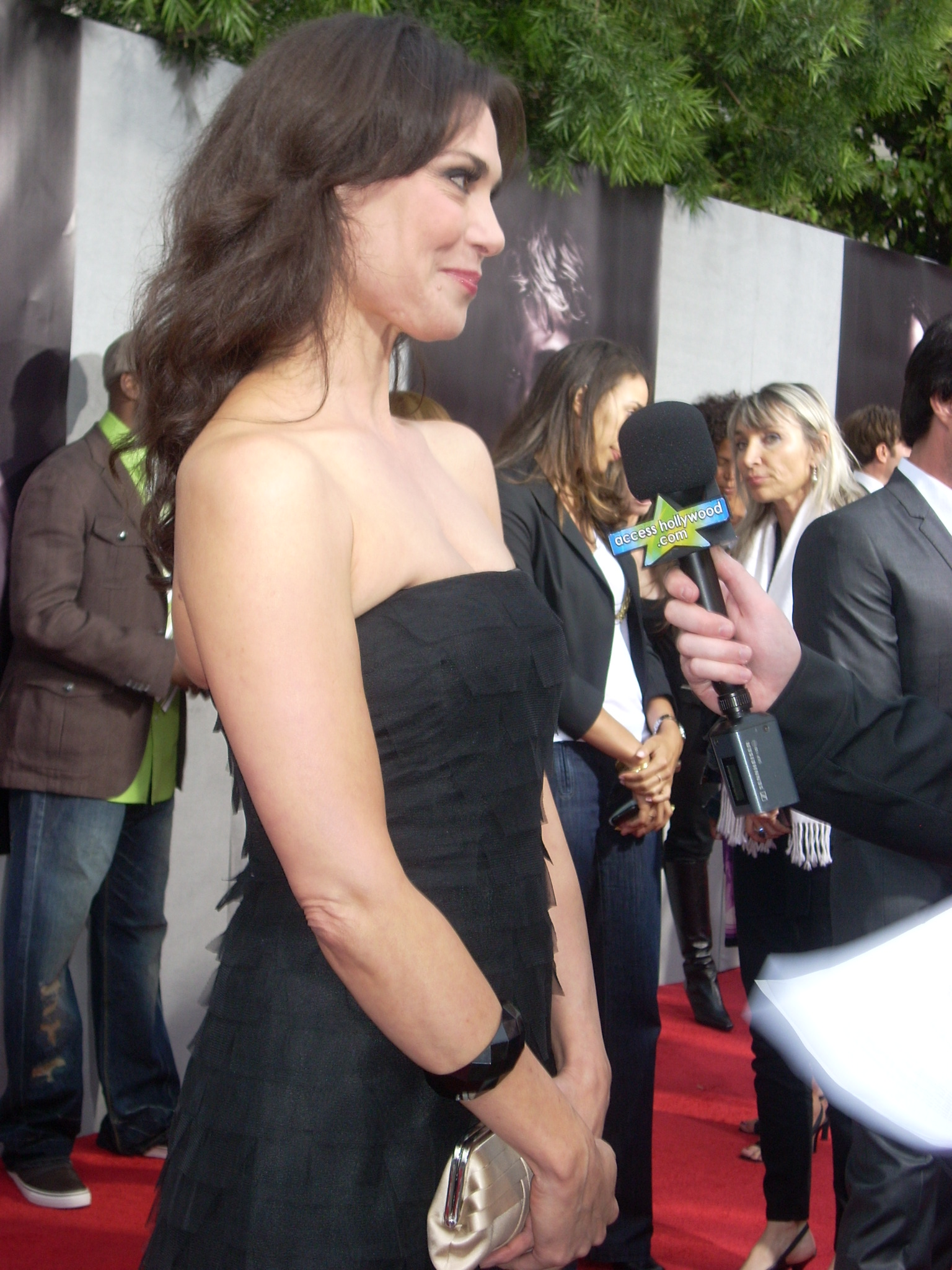
Michelle Forbes made her first Star Trek appearance in "Half a Life".

Marina Sirtis, who played Lwaxana's daughter Deanna Troi on the show, thought that compared to earlier episodes, "Half a Life" showed a different side of her character's mother. Lwaxana's interactions in the episode, argues Sirtis, considerably broadened the character; previous episodes had a tendency to become centered around Deanna and Lwaxana. Sirtis and director Les Landau felt that the plot of "Half a Life" resembled a morality play. Landau noted the similarity between the episode and the morality play-style plots that franchise creator Gene Roddenberry included in Star Trek: The Original Series. "It deals with the whole issue of growing old and how society deals with the elderly and, in my mind, it was one of the most pertinent story-lines I have done", Landau recalled.

=== Casting ===
The episode guest-starred David Ogden Stiers, best known for his role as Major Charles Emerson Winchester III on the American television series M*A*S*H. Stiers, a fan of Star Trek: The Next Generation, was enthusiastic when the producers asked him if he would be interested in appearing on the show. On the set during production, Stiers met Gene Roddenberry, the series producer, and was invited to his house to practice scenes with Roddenberry's wife, Majel Barrett. Stiers described Roddenberry as "a grand old man - not in his behaviour but in people's deference to him".

Speaking highly of the story in "Half a Life", Stiers indicated that the mood of the episode accentuated the debate over Timicin's decision to end his life. "It was an emotionally involved piece. The script quite responsibly argued both sides [of the suicide] issue and left the viewer to determine whether such a practice is acceptable or not," Stiers said. "That episode was more powerful than simply a discussion."

Michelle Forbes makes her first The Next Generation appearance in "Half a Life", in a performance which led directly to her later casting in the larger role of Ensign Ro Laren, a recurring character from season five onwards.

== Reception ==
"Half a Life" was first released within the United States on May 6, 1991, in broadcast syndication. Keith DeCandido, in a review for Tor.com, commended Stiers' acting, saying that he gave "a noble, nuanced performance as Timicin." He also approved of the episode, saying that it was the first time that Lwaxana Troi was treated as a real character without causing him to cringe; at the same time, DeCandido did not forget the problems with her previous appearances on the show. Noting that it was one of the best episodes to feature a Prime Directive debate, DeCandido endorsed the writer's idea not to take sides regarding the suicide. "This is a magnificent, tragic love story, one that takes a thin character and gives her depth, one that gives us a beautifully realized guest character in Timicin (casting Stiers was a masterstroke, as he always brings subtle nuance to his roles), and one that takes its issues seriously," DeCandido wrote. He gave the episode a score of eight out of ten, later concluding that it featured "one of the show's most tragic love stories."

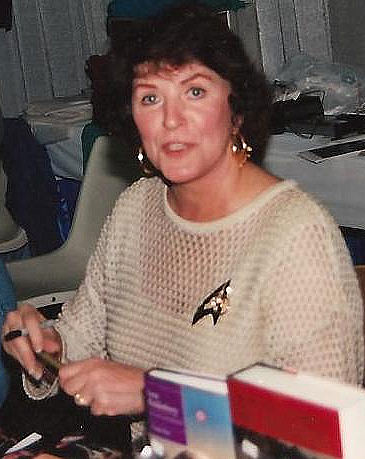
Reviewers praised the performance of Majel Barrett in "Half a Life".

In their book The Unauthorized Trek: The Complete Next Generation, James Van Hise and Hal Schuster observed a significant improvement in Majel Barrett's performance in this episode compared to her previous appearances. They said that Barrett was "capable of depth and feeling", and described the ending of the episode as "touching and disturbing". A society shouldn't naturally evolve to include ritual suicide, Van Hise and Schuster argue, but population control methods such as the one-child policy in China, appear linked to a similar required effect, albeit through different means.

Reviewing the episode for The A.V. Club, Zack Handlen said that Timicin served as an "excellent foil" for Lwaxana and made her "seem less ridiculous". The relationship between Lwaxana and Timicin "has a believable core", even if it is "broad and arguably rushed", writes Handlen. "There are some powerful moments... and it's pleasant for once to see Lwaxana adding, rather than subtracting, from a storyline." Handlen, however, criticizes the setup of Timicin's situation, as it reduced the characterization available to some of the Enterprise crew. In spite of its flaw, Handlen decides that "the episode largely redeems itself by staying true to its main point: No matter how much time you have left, it's never enough."

In 2017, Den of Geek ranked David Ogden Stiers as Timicin, in Star Trek: The Next Generation "Half a Life" as one of the top ten guest star roles on Star Trek: The Next Generation.

== Media releases ==
"Half a Life" was first released on VHS cassette in the United States and Canada on July 23, 1996. The episode was later released in the United States on September 3, 2002, as part of the Star Trek: The Next Generation season four DVD box set. The first Blu-ray release was in the United Kingdom on July 29, 2013, followed by the United States on July 30.
