= Preemptive Strike (Star Trek: The Next Generation) =

- Star Trek: The Next Generation episode
- Episode no.: Season 7 Episode 24
- Directed by: Patrick Stewart
- Story by: Naren Shankar
- Teleplay by: René Echevarria
- Cinematography by: Jonathan West
- Production code: 276
- Original air date: May 16, 1994

Guest appearances
- Michelle Forbes - Lt. Ro Laren; John Franklyn-Robbins - Macias; Natalija Nogulich - Adm. Alynna Nechayev; William Thomas, Jr. - Santos; Shannon Cochran - Kalita; Richard Poe - Gul Evek

Episode chronology
← Previous "Emergence"	Next → "All Good Things..."
- Star Trek: The Next Generation season 7

"Preemptive Strike" is the 176th episode of the syndicated American science fiction television series Star Trek: The Next Generation. It is the 24th episode of the seventh season, and penultimate episode of the series overall, directed by cast member Patrick Stewart (Captain Jean-Luc Picard).

Set in the 24th century, the series follows the adventures of the crew of the Federation starship USS Enterprise-D. In this episode, the recurring character Ro Laren (Michelle Forbes), a court-martialed Starfleet officer who first appeared in the episode "Ensign Ro", finds her loyalties divided between Starfleet and a group of resistance fighters who oppose the Cardassian Union, as she and her fellow Bajorans once did. Ro Laren would later return in Star Trek: Picard's season 3 episode "Imposters" which revealed what became of her after this episode.

In addition to wrapping the last season of Star Trek: The Next Generation', it was meant to bolster Star Trek: Deep Space Nine and Star Trek: Voyager. It was a difficult time for the show's writers because some of them also had to work on the upcoming Star Trek film, Star Trek Generations.

== Casting ==
Actress Michelle Forbes returned as Ro Laren for her sixth and final episode in this series; although there were plans to have the character on Star Trek: Deep Space Nine, Forbes turned down the offer, resulting in the creation of the character of Kira Nerys. She was later offered a lead on Star Trek: Voyager, but did not return to the franchise until 29 years later, in the 2023 episode "Imposters" of Star Trek: Picard.

== Plot ==
The Enterprise is en route to a briefing concerning a situation in Cardassian-Federation demilitarized zone. Meanwhile, newly promoted Lieutenant Ro Laren attends a welcome back party after graduating tactical training on Earth.

The Enterprise responds to a distress call from a Cardassian warship under Maquis attack and quickly forces the Maquis to withdraw. The Enterprise later rendezvous with Vice Admiral Nechayev's ship, she informs Picard of a Starfleet plan to infiltrate the terrorist cell using Ro Laren.

Ro finds her way to a bar where she is contacted by members of a Maquis cell, and after verifying her cover story, they quickly accept her into their ranks. She forms a bond with Macias, whom Ro obviously sees as a father figure. The Maquis know of a Cardassian biogenic weapon project and plan a preemptive strike; however, Macias points out they are short of critical medical supplies. Ro offers to steal the needed supplies from the Enterprise, which she manages with some covert help from the crew.

After debriefing Ro on the Enterprise, Captain Picard plots to use a ruse to draw out the Maquis and then cripple them with a Federation fleet hidden in a nearby nebula. Although Ro is troubled by his plan, she returns to the planet and convinces the Maquis leadership to plan an attack on a Cardassian convoy supposedly carrying components for the biogenic weapon. Cardassian militia raid the compound in a surprise attack, killing Macias. As he dies, he tells Ro that other Maquis like her will step forward to carry on the fight in his place.

Shortly thereafter, a very unsettled Ro meets with Picard because she is having second thoughts. Picard decides to send Commander William Riker with her to keep an eye on her and assure the mission proceeds as planned.

The day for the raid arrives, and as the Maquis fighters close in, Ro decides she cannot go through with the mission. She exposes the Federation attack force, and the Maquis ships break off their attack. With great regret, Ro asks Riker to apologize to Picard on her behalf before beaming to a Maquis vessel. On the Enterprise, Riker tells Picard that Ro seemed very sure of her decision; her only regret was in letting Picard down. The episode ends on Picard's expressionless face as he contemplates Ro's betrayal.

== Reception ==
In 2017, Business Insider listed "Preemptive Strike" as one of the most underrated episodes of the Star Trek franchise at that time.

== Video releases ==
This was released in Japan on LaserDisc on October 9, 1998 as part of the half-season collection Log.14: Seventh Season Part.2. This set included episodes from "Lower Decks" to Part II of "All Good Things", with English and Japanese audio tracks.
