= Ro Laren =

Fictional character

- Star Trek character
- Ensign Ro Laren
- First appearance: "Ensign Ro" (1991) (The Next Generation)
- Last appearance: "Imposters" (2023) (Picard)
- Created by: Gene Roddenberry
- Portrayed by: Michelle Forbes; Megan Parlen (young, "Rascals")

In-universe information
- Species: Bajoran
- Affiliation: Maquis; Starfleet
- Family: Ro Gale (father); Ro Talia (mother)
- Posting: USS Enterprise-D (Seasons 5–7); Starfleet Intelligence (Picard)
- Position: Helmsman; Intelligence Officer (Picard)
- Rank: Commander (Picard); Lieutenant (Season 7, TNG); Ensign (Seasons 5–6, TNG)

Ro Laren /ˈroʊ ˈlærən/ is a fictional character appearing on a recurring basis in the fifth, sixth, and seventh seasons of the American science-fiction television series Star Trek: The Next Generation. The character returned for the third season of Star Trek: Picard. Portrayed by Michelle Forbes, she is a member of the Bajoran species who joins the crew of the USS Enterprise-D over the fervent objection of Captain Jean-Luc Picard (Patrick Stewart), who cited her previous court-martial. Ro, too, was against joining the Enterprise crew, but said, "It is better than prison." The character was intended both to be at odds with the series regulars and to replace Wesley Crusher in the conn officer post on the bridge. Forbes was cast to portray Ro after previously appearing in the series as Dara in the episode "Half a Life".

The character first appears in the fifth-season episode "Ensign Ro", which reveals elements of Ro's backstory. She continues to appear throughout that season, and makes a further appearance in both the sixth and seventh seasons. Starfleet sought her aid to help the Cardassians apprehend a Bajoran terrorist. After joining the Enterprise crew, she wants to abandon the engineering section of the vessel following a series of power failures in "Disaster". Alongside Geordi La Forge (LeVar Burton), she is affected by a Romulan experiment in "The Next Phase", and must help prevent the aliens from destroying the Enterprise. In "Rascals", she is among the crew who are transformed into children and helps prevent a Ferengi plot. When making her final appearance in "Preemptive Strike", she is tasked by Starfleet to infiltrate the Maquis, eventually defecting and joining them permanently.

Ro was also planned to be a main character in Star Trek: Deep Space Nine, but Forbes turned down the role, so Kira Nerys was created to replace her. Reviewers discussed Ro's religious views, comparing them to those of Kira. Ro was received positively by critics and fans alike. Critics have praised Forbes's performance and Ro's interaction with the established characters. She has been placed in several polls listing the most popular characters, with Jordan Hoffman calling her the second-strongest supporting female character in the franchise.

Ro, again played by Forbes, returned for the third season of Picard in the episode "Imposters", serving as a commander for Starfleet Intelligence. Forbes will reprise her role in the upcoming video game Star Trek: Shadow Frontier.

== Concept and development ==
During the course of planning out the fifth season of Star Trek: The Next Generation, the producers were looking to add a recurring character who could conflict with the regular cast at times, as well as a new conn officer to replace Wesley Crusher. With that in mind, the episode "Ensign Ro" was written by Michael Piller, from a story idea created in conjunction with Rick Berman, to specifically introduce the character of Ensign Ro Laren. The episode was designed to show a backstory for the character, who would be at odds with series creator Gene Roddenberry's ideal that Starfleet officers should all work together seamlessly. One of her major character traits was that she would be a member of an oppressed people, whose homeworld had been conquered by another. Supervising producer Jeri Taylor explained that they had sought to add some "fresh life" using a darker character.

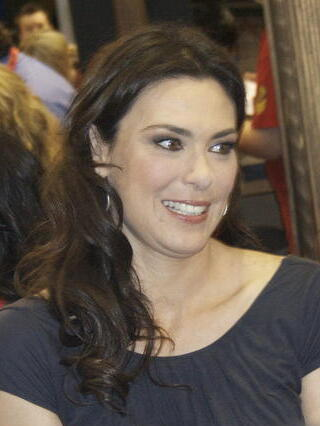
Michelle Forbes was the first actor to wear Michael Westmore's design for the Bajoran make-up.

Michelle Forbes was asked to return to the series, after impressing the producers with her performance as Dara in the episode "Half a Life". The character was the daughter of Timicin, played by David Ogden Stiers, and supported the tradition that her father should commit ritual suicide upon reaching a certain age. The Bajoran make-up was created on her, with Michael Westmore seeking to make her look different from the rest of the crew, but in a way that would not detract from her appearance. Westmore created an appliance over Forbes' nose, before adding a row of ridges on her face. It was designed to be light and flexible, as he wanted the piece to move with Forbes' facial expressions. Her version of the make-up had seven ridges, while other actors in "Ensign Ro" had different numbers, between five and nine, with the male actors wearing larger pieces.

Piller described the addition of Ro to the cast as one of that season's biggest accomplishments, and was pleased that it was well received. He added that in "Ensign Ro", they made a deliberate decision to have Ro embraced by Guinan to ensure that the fans warmed to the new addition. Piller felt that when Guinan took Ro to meet Captain Picard in that episode, the character was effectively presenting Ro to the fans of the series and endorsing her. During the writing process, he felt that once he came across the friendship between Guinan and Ro, he believed "we had really done something magnificent". Forbes, meanwhile, praised the writing and the cast of the series, saying that she had "become very attached to Star Trek".

Piller was disappointed with the following Ro episode, "Disaster", as it put her in the position of disbelieving Counselor Deanna Troi without having had the weight of "victories" in the past to convince the viewer of the power of her convictions. She enjoyed her sudden relationship with Commander William Riker in "Conundrum". Forbes shared the view of that episode, later saying: "When you have amnesia, you wonder if that brings out a side of you that's always wanted to come out. Would you really be comfortable with that? It's an interesting thing. I had a really good time with that episode." Later in the season, "The Next Phase" was written with the idea of being a vehicle for Geordi La Forge and Troi, but it was decided to include Ro, instead, as one of the lead characters. Ro had been included as one of three lead characters in Morgan Gendel's original pitch for the episode "The Inner Light". This would have seen her in a love triangle with Picard and Riker. Instead, the concept was redeveloped to focus solely on Picard.

Ro made a single appearance in the sixth season, in the episode "Rascals", in which a transporter accident reverts Ro and three others into adolescents, with the younger version of Ro portrayed by Megan Parlen. Some consideration arose after the episode about whether or not to keep Ro as a child, as her return to adulthood was never shown on screen. Taylor said that the change would have been "too drastic for us", and the idea was abandoned. Her final appearance, in the penultimate episode of the series, "Preemptive Strike", had been considered a long shot by the producers. After the failure to agree to her appearances on Star Trek: Deep Space Nine, Forbes' agent had warned them to stay away from her. A week prior to filming, no story was created for the episode other than the idea it would follow on from the Deep Space Nine episode "The Maquis", and no agreement had been reached with Forbes to appear. Her agent indicated that Forbes wanted to talk directly to the producers, so she made the phone call, making up a story for the episode as the conversation went on. Forbes agreed, making her final appearance in the series. The character was promoted to lieutenant, and Forbes wore updated Bajoran make-up developed by Westmore for Deep Space Nine.

=== Star Trek: Deep Space Nine ===
"Ensign Ro" influenced the creation of Deep Space Nine, with the Bajorans and Cardassians taken directly from the episode. The character was included in the original series description, stationed on the Bajor-based Starfleet station, and the producers had planned for her to be promoted to lieutenant in an episode of The Next Generation prior to the start of Deep Space Nine. Taylor had expected Ro to be written out of The Next Generation, so had taken some steps to see that the character was replaced. She said, "We all just love Michelle Forbes", but the plans to replace Ro would not seek to add someone with the type of fire shown by the character in such episodes as "The Next Phase". She also said that if Ro were to remain on The Next Generation, then the character would have naturally evolved away from that conflicted position, anyway.

The intention was that Ro would be one of a handful of The Next Generation characters moving over to the new series, alongside Miles and Keiko O'Brien. At this stage, the other characters were only described as a wheelchair-using science officer, (Note: The wheelchair-using science officer was replaced with Jadzia Dax. The idea was brought back for the second-season episode "Melora".) a brash doctor, a civilian law enforcer, a bar owner and the station commander and his son. Ro's position on the station would have been to act as the liaison between the station and the Bajoran government. As described in the series bible, the producers had planned for Ro to be a point of conflict with "by-the-book Starfleet officers". Regarding the other main characters, she was planned to have a friendship with Odo and be mentored by Jadzia Dax.

Both Berman and Piller sought to have Forbes sign on to portray Ro as a main character in the series, but she turned them down. She liked making occasional appearances on The Next Generation, but did not want to tie herself down to a five- to six-year main-cast contract at that point in her career. She was also apprehensive about the types of demands fan appearances made on the stars of that series, and did not want to undertake the level of appearances that would be expected of a main cast member in Deep Space Nine. The producers of Deep Space Nine decided to create a new character to fit a similar mold, which resulted in the creation of Kira Nerys, who was played by Nana Visitor. This was designed to require as minimal a change as possible in the premise of the pilot at that time, which was already under production. During the course of the series, Forbes told interviewers that she was interested in making one-off appearances in the series if she liked the story and role.

== Appearances ==
=== Background ===
In accordance with Bajoran tradition, her family name precedes her personal name. When she first joins the crew of the Enterprise-D during the course of "Ensign Ro", Captain Picard (Patrick Stewart) addresses her as "Ensign Laren". She corrects him, saying that Laren is her given name and Ro is her family name. She is then referred to as "Ensign Ro". Over the course of her several appearances in The Next Generation, information is revealed about her backstory. Bajor had been under the occupation of the Cardassians during her early life, and at the age of seven, she watched as one of the occupiers tortured her father to death. This led to a lifelong hatred of Cardassians.

Ro joined Starfleet, and after being posted to the USS Wellington, she formed part of an away team. During that mission, she disobeyed orders, resulting in the death of eight crewmen. She was subsequently court-martialled and was imprisoned on Jaros II. Admiral Kennelly (Cliff Potts) later gave her a pardon and allowed her to return to Starfleet service in return for convincing Bajoran terrorist Orta (Jeffrey Hayenga) to call off his attacks after a raid on a Federation colony. He brings her to the Enterprise for the purpose of completing this mission.

=== Star Trek: The Next Generation ===
As shown in "Ensign Ro", during an away-team mission to capture Orta, Ro manages to get the team taken hostage. As a result, Picard confines her to her quarters, but discovers that the Bajorans were not responsible for the attack on the Federation colony, and Guinan (Whoopi Goldberg) convinces Ro to tell Picard of Kennelly's plan. Ro was under orders to offer arms to Orta to trick him into revealing his presence so the Cardassians can destroy his vessel. At that point, Kennelly would intervene and order Picard not to intervene to keep the peace treaty with the Cardassians. Picard allows the plan to proceed, but the Cardassians destroy an empty ship before revealing that they had staged the attack to enlist aid against the Bajorans. At the conclusion of the episode, Picard offers Ro a position on the crew of the Enterprise, which she accepts.

In "Disaster", Ro is one of the crew trapped on the bridge of the Enterprise when it undergoes a series of power failures. The ship is placed at risk of destruction because of the potential failure of the containment fields on the antimatter pods. Ro argues that they need to separate the saucer section to save those on board it, since they have no way of knowing if anyone is still alive on the engineering part of the vessel. When the crew undergoes group amnesia in "Conundrum", Ro and Riker act on a mutual attraction until their memories are restored. In "The Next Phase", Ro and La Forge apparently die after a transporter accident after returning from a Romulan Warbird, but they have suffered the side effects of a Romulan cloaking experiment. Ro initially questions whether or not she has died and is now in the afterlife, but together with La Forge, she discovers a Romulan plot. Defeating a similarly cloaked Romulan operative, Ro and La Forge alert the crew and return to normal, warning Picard and averting disaster.

In the episode "Rascals", Ro, Picard, Guinan, and Keiko O'Brien (Rosalind Chao) are transformed into adolescent versions of themselves while retaining their adult intelligence. As children, they foil a Ferengi plot to steal the Enterprise and sell the crew as slave labor.

In her final episode, "Preemptive Strike", Ro returns to the Enterprise as a lieutenant after spending a year at Starfleet Advanced Tactical Training. During the course of her training, her commanding officer, Lieutenant Commander Chakotay, resigns from Starfleet to join the Maquis when his father is killed by the Cardassians. She is asked by Starfleet to infiltrate the rebel Maquis, who are undermining the Federation treaty with Cardassia. During the mission, she finds her loyalties in conflict with her duties, as she becomes increasingly sympathetic to the plight of the Maquis. Despite Picard's effort to force her to do her duty, she joins the rebel group. Riker says she seemed pretty sure she was doing the right thing, though she regrets disappointing Picard. Clearly wounded by Ro's betrayal, Picard remains silent.

=== Star Trek: Picard ===
Ro later returns in "Imposters", the fifth episode of the third season of Star Trek: Picard. Since leaving the Enterprise, Ro had turned herself in to Starfleet and was recruited by Starfleet Intelligence due to her experience with infiltrating terrorist organizations. She arrives on the Titan-A to presumably interrogate Picard and Riker for hijacking the ship, but after a heated exchange with Picard over her betrayal, reveals she is investigating the changelings and believes Starfleet has been compromised at the highest levels. Ro gives Picard a head start to get away, but is betrayed by her security team, actually changelings in disguise, and sacrifices herself to cripple the Intrepid to allow the Titan-A to escape, but not before giving Picard her Bajoran earring, revealed by Riker to be a data chip containing files on her entire investigation. An incoming transmission reveals that she was Worf and Raffi's mysterious handler. Before her death, Picard and Ro manage to come to terms with her betrayal, with Picard finally coming to understand her decisions. Her death greatly affects Picard.

=== Noncanonical appearances ===
Ro makes a series of appearances in the noncanonical novel series based on The Next Generation. Her first appearance is in the novel, War Drums, by John Vorholt, published in 1992, which chronicles a mission to a planet called Selva, and Ro plays a major role. Also included is an expansion on her background and early life in the book Night of the Wolves by S. D. Perry and Britta Dennison. The events of the away mission while she was serving on the USS Wellington were shown in the second special issue of DC Comics' The Next Generation series. Ro's career with the Maquis is also chronicled in the novels. In Rogue Saucer, she is responsible for planning out the attack on the Enterprise in which the Maquis steal a prototype saucer section. Ro appears in the novel Tunnel Through the Stars, set during the events of the Dominion War. Ro and the remaining Maquis join forces with Picard and the Enterprise-E to defeat the Dominion forces that are attempting to build an artificial wormhole to bypass the one near Deep Space Nine.

She began to appear in the Deep Space Nine relaunch novels beginning with the two-part Avatar by Perry. The relaunch novels show the events that occur after the final episode of the television series. In Avatar, Ro enlists in the Bajoran Militia with the rank of lieutenant, and is assigned to Deep Space Nine as the new security chief under the command of Colonel Kira. This move for Ro is also chronicled in the background to the massively multiplayer online role-playing game Star Trek Online.

In Twilight by David R. George III, the first part of the Mission: Gamma miniseries, Quark and Ro start to develop romantic feelings for each other. In Perry's Unity, Ro rejoins Starfleet after Bajor joins the Federation and its military forces are merged. She is initially apprehensive about the prospect, but is convinced to accept a pardon for her time with the Maquis by Picard. Over time, Ro was promoted to captain and as of the Star Trek: The Fall series of books, is in command of the new Deep Space Nine, following the destruction of the original at the hands of a rogue element of the Typhon Pact. Ro was also one of the characters included at launch in the strategy video game Star Trek Timelines by Disruptor Beam.

== Themes ==
The Bajorans have been described as analogues for a variety of displaced peoples, with Star Trek novelist Keith DeCandido comparing them to "Palestinians, Jews, Kurds, Haitians; the sad reality is that you can pretty much pick and choose. History is full of people who have had their homes taken from them, forced to become refugees." The Cardassian occupation of Bajor (the Bajoran homeworld) has been compared to the Holocaust, with Ro singled out as a Holocaust survivor. In his chapter "Speakers for the Dead: Star Trek, the Holocaust, and the Representation of Atrocity" within the book Star Trek as Myth, writer Matthew Wilheim Kapell compared the experiences and reactions of Ro Laren and Kira Nerys following the Cardassian occupation of Bajor. He said that the impact on Ro represented the "non-American view of the holocaust" in that she does not fully recover from the trauma and continues to affect in, for example, preventing her from connecting with her religious beliefs in "The Next Phase". He explains that Kira is a far more "Americanize[d]" character, acting as a "resister and even liberator" during the occupation. As a result, unlike Ro, Kira retains her religious beliefs and does not typically show any ongoing emotional trauma. Further commentary of Ro's relationship to religion have been made. In The Literary Galaxy of Star Trek, James F. Broderick compared the situation in which Ro and La Forge are trapped out of phase in "The Next Phase" to that of the purgatory dweller in Dante Alighieri's Inferno.

== Reception ==
When reviewing "Ensign Ro" for Tor.com, DeCandido described Michelle Forbes as "stellar" and called Ro "one of TNG's best recurring characters". He also added that the character was "a bit of piss and vinegar to add to the syrupy mix of homogeneity that the TNG cast tends to be". In his review of "Preemptive Strike", he said that the Ro character arc "comes full circle: once again making a decision that puts her on the outs with Starfleet." He praised Forbes again, saying that she "inhabits the character so completely, from her awkwardness at the reception in her honor to her playing the role of rebel, to her pain at thinking about her father... to her decision to betray Starfleet and the Enterprise." He did criticise the episode for not wrapping up the Riker-Ro relationship in the same way that closure had been given to her friendship with Picard. Zack Handlen reviewed "Ensign Ro" for The A.V. Club, and described Ro as "terrific" and said that the role represented "one of the rare times that TNG has managed to have a frustrated character who doesn't immediately seem overly hateful or falsely confrontational". But he criticized the manner in which her opinion changed to be more favourable of Picard and the Enterprise, as he felt that Guinan's intervention was detrimental to the plot.

Ro Laren has placed in several polls featuring the characters of the franchise over the course of several years. In a list of the strongest female characters on the official Star Trek website by Jordan Hoffman in 2012, Ro Laren was placed second behind Edith Keeler from the Star Trek: The Original Series episode "The City on the Edge of Forever". He said that Ro was one of the "richest figures in Trek", and wished to be able to see an alternative timeline where Forbes had accepted the main cast position on Deep Space Nine. A poll at the Creation Entertainment official Star Trek convention in 2013, conducted by Hoffman, placed Ro Laren as the fifth most popular recurring character among fans, behind Elim Garak, Q, Gul Dukat and General Martok. Hoffman expressed a view that he had expected her to place higher in the rankings, due to the number of her vocal supporters; however, she also had many booing her. On a poll run on the official Star Trek website in 2014 regarding the fans' favourite supporting character, Ro came eighth out of ten. In 2015, she was included in a list of the 21 "most interesting" supporting characters in the franchise by Lisa Granshaw at Blastr. Granshaw called Ro "a complicated, strong character", and said her "different layers and motivations made her a great character to watch interact with the loyal crew of the Enterprise."

In 2016, the character of Ro Laren was ranked as the 54th-most important character of Starfleet within the Star Trek science-fiction universe by Wired. In 2016, Screen Rant rated Ro Laren as the 15th best character in Star Trek. In 2017, IndieWire ranked Ro Laren as the 12th best character on Star Trek: The Next Generation.

In 2018, CBR ranked Ro Laren the 15th-best recurring character of all Star Trek. They point out she was the first Bajoran presented in Star Trek, and might have ended up as a character on Star Trek: Deep Space Nine.
