= Disaster (Star Trek: The Next Generation) =

- Star Trek: The Next Generation episode
- Episode no.: Season 5 Episode 5
- Directed by: Gabrielle Beaumont
- Story by: Ron Jarvis; Philip A. Scorza
- Teleplay by: Ronald D. Moore
- Production code: 205
- Original air date: October 21, 1991

Guest appearances
- Rosalind Chao - Keiko O'Brien; Colm Meaney - Miles O'Brien; Michelle Forbes - Ro Laren; Erika Flores - Marissa Flores; John Christian Graas - Jay Gordon Graas; Max Supera - Patterson Supera; Cameron Arnett - Mandel; Jana Marie Hupp - Monroe

Episode chronology
← Previous "Silicon Avatar"	Next → "The Game"
- Star Trek: The Next Generation season 5

"Disaster" is the fifth episode of the fifth season of the American science fiction television series Star Trek: The Next Generation, the 105th episode overall. It was originally released on October 21, 1991, in broadcast syndication.

Set in the 24th century, the series follows the adventures of the Starfleet crew of the Federation starship Enterprise-D. In this episode, the crew of the Enterprise must deal with several tasks outside their normal responsibilities, such as Counselor Troi commanding from the bridge, Captain Picard leading children to safety, and Chief of Security Worf delivering a baby.

The character Molly O'Brien is born in Ten Forward and this character is later shown growing up in the spin-off TV show Star Trek: Deep Space Nine (aired 1993–1999) with her parents Miles and Keiko. Troi's experiences in this episode also lead to her pursuing the rank of commander in later seasons.

== Plot ==
The crew of the Enterprise are undertaking routine tasks when suddenly the ship is struck by some outside force, rendering much of it inoperable and cutting communications between different sections. They eventually discover that the ship had collided with a fragment of a quantum filament, make emergency repairs, and set course back to the nearest starbase for a full overhaul.

Several different sub-plots are followed among the various crew members:

- Counselor Troi hesitantly takes command of the ship, as the highest-ranking officer on the bridge at the time, and is accompanied by Chief O'Brien and Ensign Ro. They find that the antimatter containment field in the warp core is rapidly deteriorating, and Ro suggests that they separate the saucer and drive sections of the Enterprise in order to save those in the former. O'Brien objects to this plan, not wanting to abandon any survivors in the drive section; Troi agrees and directs him to divert some of their minimal power reserves to the appropriate panel in Engineering, hoping that someone there can rectify the situation. This is later done by Commander Riker and Lt. Commander Data. Ro apologizes for considering such a drastic action while Troi acknowledges that she could have easily been correct.
- Riker and Data are in Ten Forward along with Worf and the pregnant Keiko O'Brien at the time of the disaster. Ten Forward is set up as a triage area with Worf and Keiko tending to the wounded. Riker and Data realize that without functioning turbolifts, it would be faster to travel through the Jefferies tubes to reach Engineering in order to regain control of the ship rather than to try to make it to the bridge. A high-voltage electrical discharge blocks their way; Data sacrifices his body to disrupt it, but his head remains fully operational and Riker takes it with him. In Engineering, they find the computer offline and Data offers to use his own positronic brain to gain basic control of ship systems. Riker notices the operating panel that indicates the containment field failure, and he and Data quickly set up the proper connections to strengthen it until repairs can be made.
- Captain Picard is giving a guided tour of the ship to three children who have won a science fair, a task he has not been looking forward to as he is uncomfortable around children. They are aboard a turbolift when the accident occurs and Picard fractures his ankle from the sudden stop. He calms the children down, and to boost their morale, assigns them honorary command roles. With their spirits renewed, Picard and the children climb out of the turbolift and up the shaft until they are able to open the lift doors on another floor and climb out safely. Picard comes to appreciate the children and offers to give them another tour once the situation has been resolved.
- Doctor Crusher and Lieutenant Commander La Forge are in a cargo bay examining a recent supply of thruster fuel. When the disaster strikes, they are trapped in the bay and find that a plasma fire has erupted in a nearby panel; it is emitting radiation capable of both endangering their lives and destabilizing the fuel to the point of explosion. By depressurizing the bay, they are able to both expel the fuel into space and extinguish the fire due to a lack of oxygen; they survive by holding on to a ladder and then re-establishing normal air pressure.
- Keiko goes into labor while she and Worf are tending to patients in Ten Forward, forcing Worf to help her deliver her child despite having only basic emergency medical training. Though the delivery is tense, Keiko gives birth to a healthy baby.

== Reception ==
Zach Handlen of The A.V. Club rated the episode a B+, stating it "tries to do too much, but its ambition does it credit, and when it works, it's very charming". Jeremy Conrad of IGN considered it one of the under-appreciated episodes of Season 5, being "a classic 'disaster movie' set in the Star Trek universe" with some funny moments.

In 2009, Time rated "Disaster" as one of the top ten moments of Star Trek including both television and film productions. They praise Counselor Troi as a "tough captain", the Ten Forward lounge turned sickbay, and overall an episode that demonstrated Star Trek: The Next Generation was a TV series that could break its "own formula".

In io9's 2014 listing of the top 100 Star Trek episodes, "Disaster" was listed as the 94th best episode.

In 2019, The Hollywood Reporter ranked "Disaster" among the top twenty-five episodes of Star Trek: The Next Generation. They note that the show puts its ensemble cast to work, but putting them in unusual pairings compared to their normal routine. Within these vignettes, the characters must confront challenges; Troi must command, Picard must help stranded children and Worf has to deliver a baby.

In 2020, this was noted for Star Trek including opera, in this case a scene where Geordi sings some Gilbert & Sullivan.

== Releases ==
The episode was released in the United States on November 5, 2002, as part of the Season 5 DVD box set. The first Blu-ray release was in the United States on November 18, 2013, followed by the United Kingdom the next day, November 19, 2013.
