= The Next Phase =

- Star Trek: The Next Generation episode
- Geordi and Ro coming back "in phase"
- Episode no.: Season 5 Episode 24
- Directed by: David Carson
- Written by: Ronald D. Moore
- Cinematography by: Marvin Rush
- Production code: 224
- Original air date: May 18, 1992

Guest appearances
- Michelle Forbes - Ens. Ro Laren; Thomas Kopache - Mirok; Susanna Thompson - Varel; Shelby Leverington - Brossmer; Brian Cousins - Parem; Kenneth Meseroll - McDowell

Episode chronology
← Previous "I, Borg"	Next → "The Inner Light"
- Star Trek: The Next Generation season 5

"The Next Phase" is the 124th episode of the American syndicated science fiction television series Star Trek: The Next Generation, the 24th episode of the fifth season. It aired in syndication on May 18, 1992.

Set in the 24th century, the series follows the adventures of the Starfleet crew of the Federation starship Enterprise-D. In this episode, the Enterprise responds to a distress call from a Romulan science ship. Lieutenant Commander Geordi La Forge and Ensign Ro Laren are lost in a transporter accident when returning to the Enterprise with a faulty generator from the Romulan ship.

== Plot ==
As the Federation starship Enterprise responds to a distress call from a Romulan ship which has suffered an on-board explosion, Ensign Ro and Lieutenant Commander La Forge are seemingly lost in a beam-in from the Romulan ship to the Enterprise. Ro and La Forge find themselves on the Enterprise, unable to interact with the ship or the crew, but able to interact with each other. While La Forge believes they are still alive, Ro sees Dr. Crusher make out their death certificates and believes they are dead; she tries to make peace with her former crewmates as they prepare a funeral service. Lt. Commander Data traces the cause of the transportation accident to the Romulan ship. Ro and La Forge go along with Data and Lt. Worf as they fly a shuttlecraft to the Romulan ship. Aboard, La Forge discovers a phase inverter device, and theorizes that he and Ro are out of phase, and thus undetectable. He also overhears the Romulan crew discussing a plan to transmit a signal to the Enterprise that will cause the warp core to explode the next time the ship enters warp. The two return with Data and Worf to the Enterprise to try to warn the crew, unaware that a Romulan, also out-of-phase, is following them.

On board the Enterprise, La Forge watches Data as he analyzes the data from the Romulan ship, and discovers high levels of chronoton emissions, part of the failing of the transporter system. La Forge recognizes that by passing through objects on the ship, he can create those emissions, and tries to encourage Data to study them more, but fails. Ro encounters the Romulan, armed with a disruptor, and leads him on a chase through the walls of the crew quarters, releasing more chronoton radiation that catches Data's interest. When Data enters the room where the Romulan has cornered Ro, La Forge rushes the Romulan, causing him to fly through the external hull of the ship into space. La Forge recovers the disruptor.

Although Captain Picard orders the ship into warp after their investigation is complete, Data cautions him to not do so until he completes a sweep of the ship with "anyon" particles to remove the chronoton radiation. Knowing that time is short before the ship will enter warp, Ro and La Forge head to their funeral—for which Data has planned a jazz funeral—and attempt to phase through objects. They fire the Romulan's disruptor to attract the attention of the attendees. When this does not work, Ro sets the disruptor to overload, causing a large burst of chronoton radiation. Data instructs the computer to sweep Ten Forward with anyon particles, causing Ro and La Forge to temporarily become visible in front of Data and Picard. Data deduces the fate of the crew members, and orders another massive flood of anyon particles, which brings Ro and La Forge back into phase. La Forge is able to warn Engineering about the warp core in time. He and Ro then join their "funeral" and celebrate with the rest of the crew with a much more joyous tone to the occasion.

== Cultural references ==
The website Women at Warp compares the mutual-invisibility situation with the Buffy the Vampire Slayer episode "Same Time, Same Place." "When LaForge and Ro end up out of phase with their timeline, they walk around witnessing normal life happening all around them, no one able to see or hear their cries for help. Following her stint in "magic rehab," Willow returns to Sunnydale out of phase with everyone else around her. In this scenario, however, it's not just that Willow's friends don't see her—she can't see them either. While the mechanics may differ, the internal struggle is the same as each character grapples with what it's like to be forgotten."

== Reception ==
In 2017 this episode was noted as one featuring scary and/or eerie Star Trek content.

The fact that the characters could walk through solid objects, but not pass through the floor, has been criticized and mocked in the Stargate SG-1 episode "Wormhole X-Treme!".

== Awards and nominations ==
The episode was nominated at the 44th Primetime Emmy Awards for Outstanding Individual Achievement in Sound Mixing for a Drama Series.

== See also ==
- "The Pegasus" - a seventh season episode involving a Federation phase-shifting cloaking device
- "Vanishing Point" - a second season Star Trek: Enterprise episode in which a character disappears
