= Datalore =

- Star Trek: The Next Generation episode
- Actor Brent Spiner played the dual role of Data (left) and his "brother" Lore (right)
- Episode no.: Season 1 Episode 13
- Directed by: Rob Bowman
- Story by: Robert Lewin; Maurice Hurley
- Teleplay by: Robert Lewin; Gene Roddenberry
- Production code: 114
- Original air date: January 18, 1988

Guest appearance
- Biff Yeager – Argyle

Episode chronology
← Previous "The Big Goodbye"	Next → "Angel One"
- Star Trek: The Next Generation season 1

"Datalore" is the thirteenth episode of the first season of the American science fiction television series Star Trek: The Next Generation, originally aired on January 18, 1988, in broadcast syndication. The story was created by Robert Lewin and Maurice Hurley, and turned into a script by Lewin and the creator of the show, Gene Roddenberry. It was Roddenberry's final script credit on a Star Trek series. The director was originally to be Joseph L. Scanlan, but following delays in pre-production caused by script re-writes, it was reassigned to Rob Bowman.

Set in the 24th century, the series follows the adventures of the Starfleet crew of the Federation starship Enterprise-D. In this episode, the Enterprise crew discover and reassemble Data's "brother", Lore (both Brent Spiner), who is in league with the entity that destroyed the colony on his home world.

The story underwent significant changes prior to filming, with it originally meant to be a romance episode for Data with a female android. It was then altered to an "evil twin" plot at the suggestion of Spiner and elements of Data's origin were introduced, first as an alien creation and then at the hands of Dr. Noonien Soong. Soong was named by Roddenberry after a friend in the Second World War. Edits to the script continued to be made during filming, and while the look of the episode was praised by cast and crew, the characterisations in the script were not. Ratings for the episode came in at 10.3 million for the first broadcast, which was lower than both the previous and subsequent episodes. Critical reception has been mixed, with criticism directed mostly at the quality of the script while Spiner has been praised for his dual role.

== Plot ==
While on the way to Starbase Armus IX for computer maintenance, the Enterprise arrives at the planet Omicron Theta, the site of a vanished colony where the starship Tripoli originally found the android Data (Brent Spiner). An away team travels to the surface and finds that what had been farmland is now barren with no trace of life in the soil. The team also finds a lab which they discover is where Dr. Noonien Soong, a formerly prominent but now discredited robotics designer, built Data. The team also find a disassembled android nearly identical to Data and return with it to the ship. As the course to the Starbase is resumed, the crew reassemble and reactivate Data's "brother" (also played by Brent Spiner) in sickbay. He refers to himself as Lore, and explains that Data was built first and he himself is the more perfect model. He feigns naiveté to the crew, but shows signs of being more intelligent than he is letting on. Later, in private, he tells Data that they were actually created in the opposite order, as the colonists became envious of his own perfection. He also explains that a crystalline space entity capable of stripping away all life force from a world was responsible for the colony's demise.

Lore then incapacitates Data, revealing that he plans to offer the ship's crew to the entity. When a signal transmission is detected from Data's quarters, Wesley Crusher (Wil Wheaton) arrives to investigate. He finds Lore, now impersonating Data, who explains that he had to incapacitate his brother after being attacked. Wesley is doubtful, but pretends to accept the explanation. Soon after, the same crystalline entity that had attacked the colony approaches the ship. Lore, still pretending to be Data, enters the bridge as the object hovers before the Enterprise and explains that he incapacitated his brother by turning him off, causing Doctor Beverly Crusher (Gates McFadden) to be suspicious, since Data had previously treated the existence of such a feature as a closely guarded secret. Lore then explains that he can communicate with the crystalline entity and suggests to Captain Jean-Luc Picard (Patrick Stewart) that he should show a demonstration of force by beaming an object toward the entity and then destroying it with the ship's phasers.

Lore's attempts to imitate Data are imperfect, though, arousing Picard's suspicion, especially when Lore does not recognize Picard's usual command to "make it so". Although Picard sends a security detachment to tail him, Lore overpowers Lt. Worf (Michael Dorn) and evades pursuit. Meanwhile, the suspicious Dr. Crusher and her son, Wesley, reactivate the unconscious Data, and the three of them race to the cargo hold to find Lore plotting with the entity to defeat the Enterprise. When Lore discovers them, he threatens Wesley with a phaser and orders Dr. Crusher to leave. Data quickly rushes Lore and a brawl ensues. Data manages to knock Lore onto the transporter platform, and Wesley activates it, beaming Lore into space. With its conspirator no longer aboard, the crystalline entity departs, and the Enterprise resumes its journey to the starbase.

== Production ==
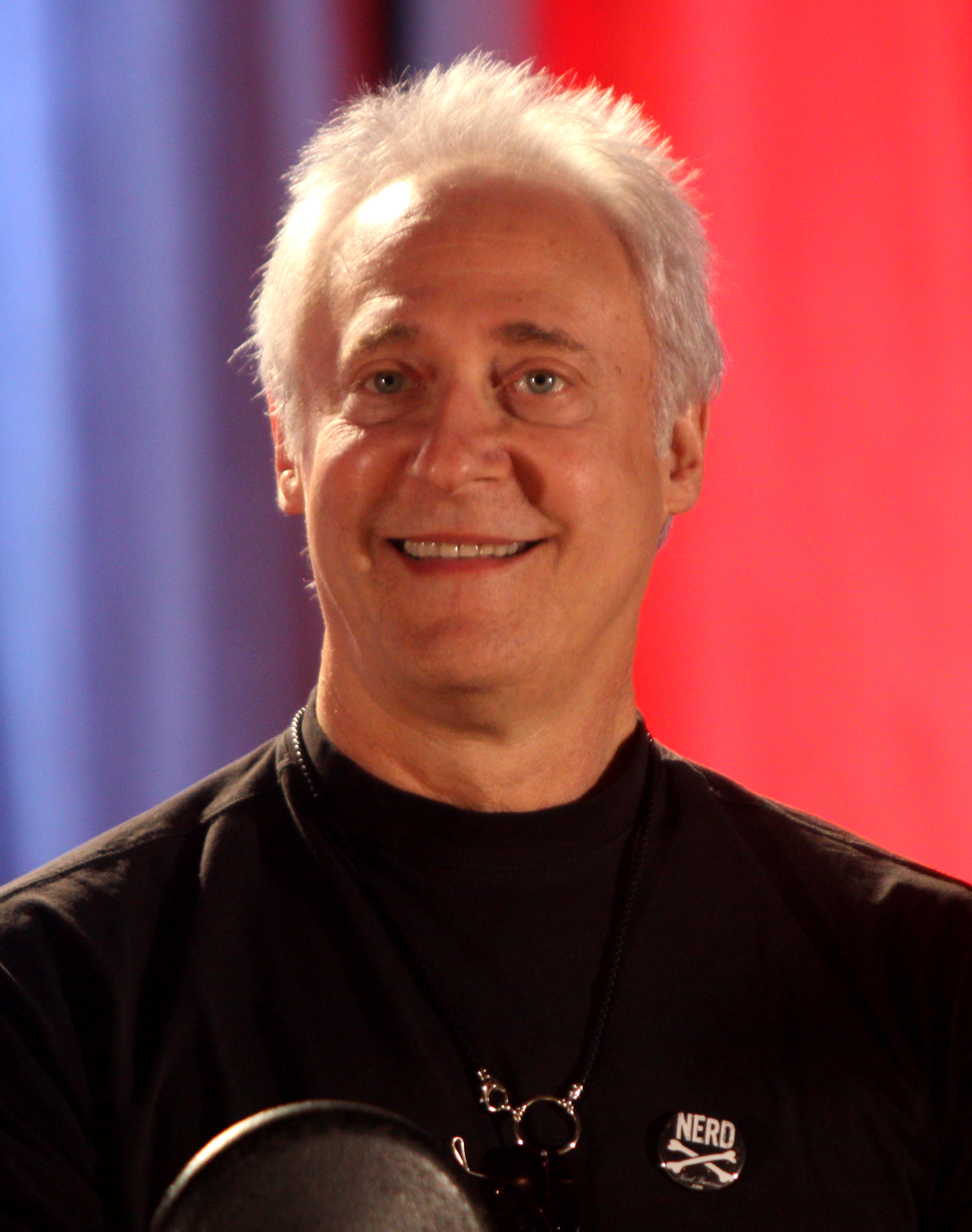
Actor Brent Spiner originally suggested the "evil twin" storyline featured in this episode.

The original story for this episode featured a non-lookalike female android who was intended to be a love interest for Data. The new android was intended to have been created as something that could be deployed into dangerous or hazardous situations, described in the premise as something along the lines of a female android version of Red Adair, the fire fighter. The "evil twin" story was suggested by Brent Spiner, instead, and was originally developed to include the creation of Data by an alien race. This was instead dropped and Dr. Noonien Soong was introduced. Soong was named by Gene Roddenberry after his Second World War friend, Kim Noonien Singh, for whom the character Khan Noonien Singh was also named. It would be Roddenberry's final script credit on a Star Trek series. The script made mention of Isaac Asimov and the Laws of Robotics, something which had been suggested should be included at some point in the show as a spoken credit in a memo dated October 28, 1986 from supervising producer Bob Justman. The episode suffered delays during pre-production caused by re-writes to the script, resulting in the script being switched with "The Big Goodbye", which meant that director Joseph L. Scanlan went on to direct that episode instead. Rob Bowman, who had previously been told by Justman that he was going to direct "The Big Goodbye" after his work on "Too Short a Season", was instead assigned to direct "Datalore".

He took the new episode on as a challenge, in the belief that the producers did not think the episode would work well, which caused him to become determined to put out a good episode. He had numerous discussions with Brent Spiner, Justman, and Rick Berman on aspects of the episode, and the technical requirements and effects required an additional day of filming. Bowman credited Spiner for making the episode work, giving one example, "He did the one scene in his own office with Brent sitting down and Lore discussing what it's like to be human. He did one side, we shot through a double, then turned around, read it the other way and shot the other half of it. Those two characters in those scenes are different people... he really painted those characters differently." Edits were still being made to the script during filming, as the writers wanted to introduce a new element to Data, in order to further distinguish him from Lore: an inability to use contractions. Data had used contractions during earlier episodes, and Spiner refused to shoot the scene until a final decision was reached; production stopped while there was a meeting on this subject between Roddenberry, the producers, and the writers, in the middle of the bridge set.

This episode was the second and last appearance of Biff Yeager as Chief Engineer Argyle. He was the only one of the Chief Engineers introduced during the first season to appear twice, with Geordi La Forge (LeVar Burton) gaining the role in season two. Wil Wheaton later recalled that the stand-in actor used in this episode really irritated Spiner, and was never used again. He described the stand-in as looking like "a break dancer doing the Robot" whenever he had to portray Data or Lore, and said that "I think the guy was really into playing an android, and his enthusiasm got cranked up to eleven, but by the end of the week, pretty much everyone wanted to deactivate him and sell him to the nearest Jawa." The events of the episode would be followed up in later seasons, with the crystalline entity returning in the fifth-season episode "Silicon Avatar". Brent Spiner reprised the role of Lore in the episodes "Brothers" and "Descent".

The music for the episode was composed by Ron Jones. For this episode, Jones created a six-note theme to represent Lore. The crystalline entity was given a theme of three notes which played through two pieces entitled "Crystal Entity" and "Crystal Attacks". The music played when the away team explore Omicron Theta was similar to that created by Jerry Goldsmith for the 1979 film Alien. Jones acknowledged that link saying that, "I was playing with the stuff like Jerry's music at the beginning of Alien, Bowman was like our Ridley Scott—he was like Ridley Scott Jr. and I was Jerry Goldsmith Jr."

== Reception ==
"Datalore" was first broadcast on January 18, 1988, in broadcast syndication. The episode received Nielsen ratings of 10.3 million on the first broadcast, which was a dip between "The Big Goodbye" which received ratings of 11.5 in the previous week, and "Angel One" which gained ratings of 11.4 million in the next week.

Several reviewers re-watched the episode after the end of the series. Keith DeCandido reviewed the episode for Tor.com in June 2011. He summed up, "While it's important in the grand scheme of things in what it establishes about Data's background, the episode itself is horrendously bad, from the clumsy script to the embarrassingly inept body-double work." He thought the ending was anticlimactic, that the characters all acted "as dumb as posts", and that Spiner's performance as Lore was scenery chewing. DeCandido gave "Datalore" a score of four out of ten. Cast member Wil Wheaton watched the episode for AOL TV in December 2007. While he credited the art direction of the episode, he criticised the story, saying that "it comes down to lazy writing that has things happen because they're supposed to happen, rather than having them happen organically. The characters are credulous when they should be skeptical, the audience is not surprised by anything after the second act, and there are story problems that should have never gotten past the first draft." He remembered really enjoying the episode as a child, but felt that it did not hold up on repeat watchings as an adult, and stated that Spiner's "fantastic job creating distinctly different characters in Data and Lore" was not enough to remedy the other faults in the episode. He gave it a D grade.

Michelle Erica Green, who reviewed the episode for TrekNation in May 2007, thought she might be more forgiving in hindsight as she knows that the follow-ups to "Datalore" were great episodes. She praised Spiner's "lovely, subtle performances as both Data and Lore", but felt that Lore's motivations and goals were unclear, and that the crew came off as stupid by their inaction to the Lore threat. She thought that transporting the villain into space was shocking (as the show generally presents androids as having personhood) and inconsistent (as Lore had just told the entity to attack when the shields drop following a transporter activation). Jamahl Epsicokhan at his website "Jammer's Reviews" valued the episode for providing backstory to Data, but agreed that the crew's inability to recognize Lore's threat and unwillingness to listen to Wesley made them seem stupid. He gave the episode a score of three out of four.

Zack Handlen watched "Datalore" for The A.V. Club in April 2010. He noted that Data's origins had significant plotholes, such as that the ship which found Data did not investigate the planet. He thought that Lore was a well-conceived villain who works well with Spiner's strengths as an actor, but that the story only scratched the surface of the character's potential. He considered the contraction issue a problem, as despite saying that Data could not use them, he uses them throughout the episode, including immediately after Lore was beamed off the ship, which "punishes you for paying attention, because now you'll be half-convinced that the wrong robot was beamed away, and that Lore somehow won out in the end." He disliked the response of the crew to Wesley and thought that he was being mistreated, and gave the episode an overall grade of B−.

Producer Maurice Hurley was pleased with the outcome of the episode, saying "The sets, the design of it and the look of that show was brilliant, I thought that might have been the best-looking show of the first season". However, he felt that the characterisations were not quite right. This was the same opinion as that put forward by actor Brent Spiner, who portrayed both Data and Lore, who thought that Data's actions were not in line with his expectations of the character.

== Home media and theatrical release ==
Episodes from "Encounter at Farpoint" to "Datalore" were released in Japan on LaserDisc on June 10, 1995, as part of First Season Part.1. This included half the first-season episodes with a total runtime of 638 minutes on 12-inch optical video discs. The episode was released as part of the season one Blu-ray set on July 24, 2012. In order to celebrate the 25th anniversary of Star Trek: The Next Generation and promote the release of the first season on Blu-ray, the episodes "Datalore" and "Where No One Has Gone Before" received a theatrical release in the United States on July 23, 2012, in nearly 500 cinemas. "Datalore" was chosen by Star Trek experts Mike and Denise Okuda because of the fan favourite status of Brent Spiner. The Crystalline Entity was one of the first uses of CG graphics on the show, and its presentation had to be re-created in new CGI graphics for the Blu-ray release.

== See also ==
- "Silicon Avatar", episode revealing that the deadly crystalline entity was lured to the planet Omicron Theta by Lore
- "Inheritance", in which Data learns why he was given the memories of the colonists of Omicron Theta
- Galactus, a Marvel Comics character who consumes the life force of planets.
