= Ensign Ro (Star Trek: The Next Generation) =

- Star Trek: The Next Generation episode
- Episode no.: Season 5 Episode 3
- Directed by: Les Landau
- Story by: Michael Piller; Rick Berman
- Teleplay by: Michael Piller
- Production code: 203
- Original air date: October 7, 1991

Guest appearances
- Michelle Forbes - Ensign Ro Laren; Scott Marlowe - Keeve Falor; Frank Collison - Dolak; Jeffrey Hayenga - Orta; Harley Venton - Collins; Ken Thorley - Mot; Cliff Potts - Admiral Kennelly; Whoopi Goldberg - Guinan; Majel Barrett - Computer voice

Episode chronology
← Previous "Darmok"	Next → "Silicon Avatar"
- Star Trek: The Next Generation season 5

"Ensign Ro" is the 103rd episode of the American science-fiction television series Star Trek: The Next Generation, the third episode of the fifth season.

Set in the 24th century, the series follows the adventures of the Starfleet crew of the Federation starship Enterprise-D.

== Plot ==
The Solarion IV settlement is destroyed, and the Bajorans claim responsibility. Their homeworld Bajor was annexed by the Cardassians decades ago, and the Bajorans have been refugees ever since, and apparently some of them are using terrorism to draw attention from the United Federation of Planets. Captain Picard meets with Admiral Kennelly, who tells him that the Bajoran responsible is a terrorist named Orta. Picard's mission is to find Orta, and to send him back to the Bajoran settlement camps where he can do less damage. Kennelly assigns a controversial person to assist Picard: Starfleet Ensign Ro Laren, a Bajoran whose reputation is very poor. Kennelly insists she can help, and she comes aboard the Enterprise.

Despite a difficult attitude, Ro works with the crew to locate Orta. Ultimately, they head to the third moon Vallor I where they believe he is based. Meanwhile, Ro receives a secret communication from Admiral Kennelly and tells him all is going exactly as he predicted. The next day, the away team prepares to beam down, but discovers Ensign Ro had pre-empted them by beaming down six hours earlier. They follow her, and are promptly captured by Orta and his people. Orta, who was disfigured by Cardassian torture, tells them that he felt abducting them was necessary, and says that the Bajorans were not responsible for the attack.

Picard finds himself inclined to believe Orta, but confines Ro to quarters for her unauthorized beam down. Guinan, who has befriended Ro, goes to see her, and after learning more is going on than meets the eye, convinces Ro to talk to Picard. Ro reveals that she is on a secret mission by Kennelly to offer Orta Federation weapons in exchange for returning to the camps. Given her experiences, she no longer knows what to do or whom to trust. Picard decides that the best course might be to actually take Orta back to the camps, and see what occurs. However, as the Enterprise escorts a Bajoran cruiser to the camp, two Cardassian ships cross the border and demand the Enterprise leave the ship to them. Picard initially refuses, and the Cardassians give him an hour to reconsider. Far from helping, Kennelly insists that the Cardassian treaty is the more important issue and orders Picard to withdraw.

Picard withdraws, and the Bajoran cruiser is destroyed. However, suspecting a chain of events like this might occur, Picard had ensured no one was aboard, and had the ship operated remotely. Picard informs Kennelly that the Bajoran ships are so old and obsolete that they were incapable of even reaching the Solarion IV settlement, much less attacking it, and suggests that the Cardassians staged everything, hoping to find someone like Kennelly, naive enough to help them solve their problems. With the mystery solved and the mission accomplished, Ro accepts Picard's offer to remain in Starfleet and join the Enterprise crew.

== Casting and impact ==
Actress Michelle Forbes was cast as the troubled Bajoran Starfleet officer Ro Laren, who would become a very popular character on The Next Generation. She was offered lead roles on both Star Trek: Deep Space Nine and Star Trek: Voyager, and attempts were made to set the Ro Laren character up for a role on those series, but it did not work out. One impact of this was that the character Kira Nerys was created as a replacement for Ro Laren on Star Trek: Deep Space Nine, played by actress Nana Visitor.

== Reception ==
Variety listed "Ensign Ro" as one of the top-15 episodes of Star Trek: The Next Generation.

The A.V. Club gave the episode an A− and said that the new character Ro was "terrific".

The character of Ensign Ro led to a recurring role on the series, and was an influential and popular character for the Star Trek franchise. In The Deep Space Nine Companion, Ro is said to be one of the reasons Bajor was picked for the then-new spin-off that became Star Trek: Deep Space Nine. Ensign Ro inspired the character Kira on that show when the original actress was not available.

== Releases ==
On October 22, 1996, this episode and "Silicon Avatar" were released on LaserDisc in the United States.

The episode was later released in the United States on November 5, 2002, as part of the season-five DVD box set. The first Blu-ray release was in the United States on November 18, 2013, followed by the United Kingdom the next day.
