= Silicon Avatar =

- Star Trek: The Next Generation episode
- Episode no.: Season 5 Episode 4
- Directed by: Cliff Bole
- Story by: Lawrence V. Conley
- Teleplay by: Jeri Taylor
- Production code: 204
- Original air date: October 14, 1991

Guest appearances
- Ellen Geer - Kila Marr; Susan Diol - Carmen Davila

Episode chronology
← Previous "Ensign Ro"	Next → "Disaster"
- Star Trek: The Next Generation season 5

"Silicon Avatar" is the 104th episode of the American science fiction television series Star Trek: The Next Generation. It is the fourth episode of the fifth season.

Set in the 24th century, the series follows the adventures of the Starfleet crew of the Federation starship Enterprise-D.

The life form featured in this episode was previously introduced in "Datalore".

== Plot ==
Commander Riker, Lieutenant Commander Data, and Doctor Crusher are visiting the Melona IV colony, when the Crystalline Entity appears and begins tearing up the planetary surface. Although the rapid evacuation into the caves is mostly successful, two of the colonists, one of whom Riker has expressed a possible romantic interest in, die in the onslaught. The Enterprise comes to the survivors' aid and frees them after the Entity leaves. The Enterprise sets out in pursuit of the Entity, with the help of Kila Marr, who is a xenobiologist and expert on the creature. Marr does not trust Data, as she is aware that Data's brother Lore has assisted the Entity in the past. Captain Picard hopes to challenge this perception by having Data work closely with Doctor Marr, in spite of Counselor Deanna Troi's worry that his suggestion will not reduce Doctor Marr's feelings of animosity.

While working around the caves of Melona IV, Marr continues to show animosity towards Data. Slightly confused, Data tries to convince her that he is nothing like Lore and has no affiliation with the Entity. When he asks her what makes her think he had anything to do with the Entity, Marr reveals the source of her prejudice: her 16-year-old son was killed by the Entity at Omicron Theta, which was also Data's homeworld. She shows Data her sense of revenge and justice by threatening that if she finds out that he is involved with the Entity as she suspects him to be, she will have him "disassembled piece by piece". Picard tells Marr that he does not intend to kill the Entity without first attempting to communicate with it. Marr is skeptical but she and Data work out a method for talking to the Entity. As Dr. Marr works with Data, she comes to understand that Data and Lore are different, recognizing Data's stoic yet virtuous personality and high intellect. During their research, Marr discovers Data is programmed with the memories and experiences of the Omicron Theta colony, including those of her dead son, Raymond "Renny". Data tells her about how much her son admired her work as a scientist. At Marr's request, Data reads extracts from her son's journals, in the teenager's voice, causing the emotionally moved woman to cry over hearing the sound of her dead son's voice.

The Enterprise locates the Entity and begins sending a series of graviton pulses toward it. The creature responds and emits a response pattern which is a clear sign of comprehension. Picard is elated at a potential first contact. However, in a moment of intentional malice fueled by the long-held desire to avenge the death of her son, Marr alters the pulse to emit gravitons in a continuous beam and locks the program so it cannot be stopped. The beam reaches a level of resonance where the Entity is shattered. Marr addresses Data as though he is her son, telling him that she destroyed the entity for him. Having taken her long-awaited revenge but sacrificing her career in the process, Marr is near collapse. A disgusted Picard has Data escort Marr back to her quarters. In her quarters, Marr asks Data how long he will function and he replies that he was programmed to function for an eternity. Relieved, Marr tells Data that as long as he functions, her son is alive. Speaking to him as if he were her son, Dr. Marr pleads to Data to let "Renny" know that she destroyed the Entity for him, in the hopes that her deed will give her son's spirit a sense of peace. Data informs her that her son would not have approved of her destroying the Entity, stating that he loved her work as a scientist but that in her grief over his death, she destroyed the very reason her work is so important and that he cannot help her.

== Reception ==
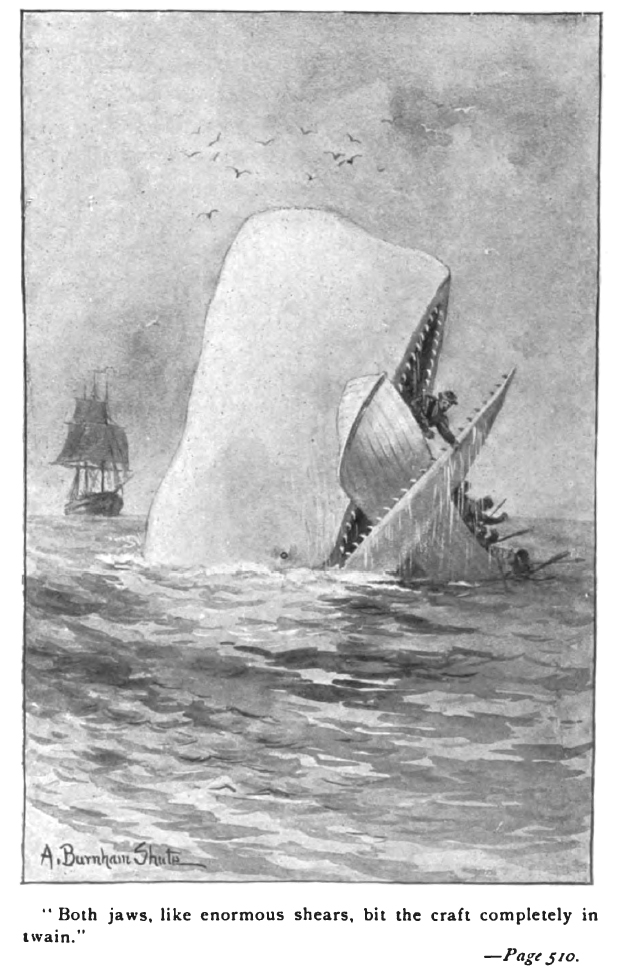
Silicon Avatar has been compared to the Novel Moby Dick, with the Crystalline Entity being compared to the Whale

The Crystalline Entity was noted by Space.com as being one of the more exotic aliens in the Star Trek franchise; they note its snowflake-like appearance—beautiful but deadly. The episode is noted for including a non-carbon based life form, which has been explored a number of other times in the Star Trek franchise.

In Star Trek FAQ 2.0 (Unofficial and Unauthorized): Everything Left to Know About the Next Generation, the Movies, and Beyond by Mark Clark, he states that this is one of the Star Trek episodes that is inspired by the classic novel Moby Dick. He compares the Crystalline Entity to a whale and the character Marr to Captain Ahab. They elaborate that this can be compared to the 1967 Star Trek episode "The Doomsday Machine" which also had elements from that novel. They remark the episode creates an "emotionally charged scenario" and praise actress Ellen Geer's performance as Doctor Marr.

In The Music of Star Trek, they felt that Chattaway's score offered "memorable dramatic support" to "Silicon Avatar".

In Star Trek Visions of Law and Justice they questioned the Crystalline Entity's right to life after it had killed so many.

== Releases ==
On October 22, 1996 this episode and "Ensign Ro" were released on LaserDisc in the United States.

The episode was later released in the United States on November 5, 2002, as part of the season five DVD box set. The first Blu-ray release was in the United States on November 18, 2013, followed by the United Kingdom the next day, November 19, 2013.

== See also ==
- "Datalore", the first season episode where the Crystalline Entity first appears.
- Galactus, a Marvel Comics character who survives by consuming the life force of entire planets.
