= Erika Flores =

American actress

- Born: November 2, 1979 (age 46); Grass Valley, Nevada County, California, U.S.
- Years active: 1990–2009
- Known for: Dr. Quinn, Medicine Woman; Disaster
- Spouse: Bartlett E. "Bart" Burson (m. 2006)

Erika Flores (born November 2, 1979, in Grass Valley, Nevada County, California) is an American former actress, and sister of Melissa Flores, also a former child actress.

== Career ==
She is known for her role as the first Colleen Cooper in the Dr. Quinn, Medicine Woman TV series; Flores left the role in 1995, in the middle of the third season, and the role was then recast with Jessica Bowman taking over as Colleen.

Flores guest-starred on the Star Trek: The Next Generation episode "Disaster". She played Marissa Flores, one of three young science-fair winners aboard the USS Enterprise.

In January 2009, Flores guest starred and had her last role as Sarah, the main patient in "Big Baby", a fifth-season episode of the Fox show, House.

She also made appearances on Dear John, Empty Nest, Step by Step, and CSI: Miami.

== Personal life ==
She married Bartlett E. "Bart" Burson on July 1, 2006, and has two children.

== Filmography ==
Year	Title	Role	Notes
1990	Kaleidoscope	Young Hilary	TV movie
1990	Dear John	Jessica at 12	Episode: "The Blunder Years"
1991	Switched at Birth	Arlena Twigg, age 9	TV movie
1991	The Owl	Lisa	TV movie
1991	Star Trek: The Next Generation	Marissa Flores	Episode: "Disaster"
1991	Empty Nest	Luella	Episode: "Lonely Are the Brave"
1992	She Woke Up	Elizabeth	TV movie
1992	Step by Step	Max	Episode: "Bully for Mark"
1992	Reasonable Doubts	Cindy Nichols	Episode: "Maggie Finds Her Soul"
1992	Bodies of Evidence	Chris Shepherd	Episode: "The Cold Light of Day"
1993	Bloodlines: Murder in the Family	Student #1	TV movie
1993	Visions of Murder	Kimberly	TV movie
1993–1995	Dr. Quinn, Medicine Woman	Colleen Cooper	59 episodes
1996	Soul of the Game	Girl	TV movie
1996	Buried Secrets	Mary Roff	TV movie
1997	The Secret	Sharon	TV movie
1998	Nothing Sacred		Episode: "Felix Culpa"
1999	The Love Boat: The Next Wave	Ashley	Episode: "Three Stages of Love"
2000	The Policewoman	Gina	Short film
2000	Lost in Oz	Kimber Denslow	TV movie
2002	CSI: Miami	Cadet Julie Morales	Episode: "Camp Fear"
2007	Quake	Cybele Fisher	Short film
2009	House	Sarah	Episode: "Big Baby"
