= Switched at Birth (1991 film) =

- VHS cover
- Genre: Drama
- Written by: Michael O'Hara
- Directed by: Waris Hussein
- Starring: Bonnie Bedelia; Brian Kerwin; John M. Jackson; Ariana Richards; Erika Flores
- Music by: Marvin Hamlisch
- Country of origin: United States
- Original language: English

Production
- Executive producers: Richard Heus; Lawrence Horowitz; Barry Morrow; Michael O'Hara; Jeff Wald; Mayank Velhankar
- Producer: Ervin Zavada
- Cinematography: Robert Steadman
- Editors: Paul Dixon; James Galloway
- Running time: 186 minutes
- Production companies: Columbia Pictures Television; Morrow-Heus Productions; O'Hara-Horowitz Productions

Original release
- Network: NBC
- Release: April 28, 1991

Switched at Birth is a 1991 American miniseries directed by Waris Hussein. It is based on the true story of Kimberly Mays and Arlena Twigg, babies switched soon after birth in a Florida hospital in 1978. NBC aired the production as a two-part miniseries over two consecutive nights on April 28, 1991.

== Plot ==
Within days of Arlena Twigg's birth in Florida in late 1978, she is found to have a chronic illness. Blood tests reveal that she is not the biological daughter of Regina and Ernest Twigg. Arlena is ill throughout her life and dies at the age of nine. Subsequently, her parents search for their biological daughter, who they find is being raised as Kimberly Mays by a man who believes that he is her father.

== Cast ==
- Bonnie Bedelia as Regina Twigg
- Brian Kerwin as Robert "Bob" Mays
- John M. Jackson as Ernest Twigg
- Eve Gordon as Darlena
- Jacqueline Scott as Ruth Mays
- Judith Hoag as Barbara Mays
- Caroline McWilliams as Lois Morehead
- Lois Smith as Margaret Hill
- Kelli Williams as Irisa
- Ariana Richards as Kimberly Mays, Age 9-11
- Erika Flores as Arlena Twigg, Age 9
- Ed Asner as Ted Marx
- Beth Grant as Sophie
- Rance Howard as Frank Hill
- Vivian Bonnell as Nurse Ford
- Allison Mack as Normia Twigg

== Factual basis ==
Kimberly Mays and Arlena Twigg were born within a few days of each other in a Wauchula, Florida hospital in November 1978. Kimberly went home with Bob Mays and his wife Barbara, who died of ovarian cancer when Kimberly was three. Ernest and Regina Twigg of Sebring, Florida took home the Mays' biological daughter, whom they named Arlena. The Twiggs learned that Arlena had the wrong blood type to be their biological daughter when she was nine years old. Following Arlena's death from a heart condition, the Twiggs sought information about their biological daughter and located Kimberly Mays, who became the subject of a custody battle between her biological parents and Bob Mays, the man who raised her after she was switched at birth. Bob Mays had agreed in 1989 to grant the Twiggs visitation rights to Kimberly, but he later cut off the visits. The Twiggs then sued for increased visitation or custody of Kimberly. A Wauchula circuit court ruled in 1993 that Kimberly would be allowed to cut off all contacts with her biological family and that Bob Mays was her psychological father. Though Kimberly won the right to stay with Bob Mays, she later ran away and moved in with the Twiggs.

In a 2015 interview with Barbara Walters for the documentary series American Scandals on Investigation Discovery, Kimberly discussed her troubled early adulthood, two divorces, six children, losing custody of her firstborn to her first husband, living in her car with one child, and working as a stripper to buy food for her children.

The court battle was also the subject of a book entitled The Baby Swap Conspiracy by Loretta Schwarz-Nobel.

== See also ==
- Switched at Birth (1999 film)
- Switched at Birth (TV series)
- Paramparça (TV series)
