= Peter Allan Fields =

American screenwriter and producer (1935–2019)

- Born: May 12, 1935
- Died: 19 June 2019 (aged 84)
- Occupations: screenwriter; producer
- Years active: 1965–1999
- Awards: Hugo Award

Peter Allan Fields (May 12, 1935 – June 19, 2019) was a screenwriter and producer, best known for many episodes of Star Trek: The Next Generation and Star Trek: Deep Space Nine. Fields wrote some of the most acclaimed episodes of both series including "The Inner Light" for The Next Generation along with "Duet" and "In the Pale Moonlight" for Deep Space Nine. He also wrote for The Six Million Dollar Man, including the episode "The Seven Million Dollar Man" (1974).

== Early life ==
Before becoming a screenwriter Fields worked as a lawyer while writing short stories in his free time, eventually two law clients told him of a new show seeking writers, namely The Man from U.N.C.L.E., which set his Hollywood career in motion.

In a Twitter thread honoring Fields after his death fellow Star Trek screenwriter Robert Hewitt Wolfe relayed an unconfirmed story that Fields had lied about his age to join the US Marine Corps at 16 during the Korean War fighting at the Battle of Inchon after which he was captured and spent several months as a POW before being released because of his age. He returned to the US only to be drafted into the US Army at age 18 and supposedly sent back to Korea where he fought at the Battle of Chosin Reservoir. After his service he then used the GI Bill to study at the University of Southern California. Wolfe said of the account "So what is true about him and what is a story? I certainly don’t know."

== Television Career ==
After working as a lawyer Fields broke into Hollywood as a screenwriter working on the spy series The Man from U.N.C.L.E. for which he wrote 11 episodes. Over the next three and half decades he would write for shows such as The Rat Patrol, McCloud, The Six Million Dollar Man, Executive Suite, The Eddie Capra Mysteries, Knight Rider, Jake and the Fatman, and Xena: Warrior Princess.

Beginning in 1991 Fields began working as a writer on Star Trek: The Next Generation writing three episodes including the season five episode "The Inner Light" which won the 1993 Hugo Award for Best Dramatic Presentation. Fields served as co-producer and later producer on the first two seasons of Deep Space Nine and wrote a total of ten episodes across the series including the episodes "Duet" and "In the Pale Moonlight".

== Death ==
Fields died on June 19th 2019 at the age of 84. His death was announced by Star Trek: Deep Space Nine showrunner Ira Steven Behr via Twitter.

== Star Trek filmography ==
- Star Trek: The Next Generation
  - "Half a Life"
  - "Cost of Living"
  - "The Inner Light"
- Star Trek: Deep Space Nine
  - "Dax"
  - "Progress"
  - "Duet"
  - "The Circle"
  - "Necessary Evil"
  - "Blood Oath"
  - "Crossover"
  - "For the Uniform"
  - "In the Pale Moonlight"
  - "The Dogs of War'

== Other contributions ==
- The Man from U.N.C.L.E.
- The Spy in the Green Hat
- Heroic Mission (1967 TV Series)
- The Rat Patrol
- It Takes a Thief
- The New Adventures of Huckleberry Finn
- The F.B.I.
- The Young Rebels
- The Name of the Game
- McCloud
- Madigan
- Heatwave!
- Get Christie Love!
- The Six Million Dollar Man
- Executive Suite
- Switch
- Man from Atlantis
- The Eddie Capra Mysteries
- A Man Called Sloane
- Nero Wolfe (1981 TV Series)
- Darkroom
- Cassie & Co. (1982 TV Series)
- Knight Rider
- Jake and the Fatman
- Legend
- Xena: Warrior Princess

== Awards and nominations ==
Year	Award	Category	Series	Episode	Result
1993	Hugo Awards	Best Dramatic Presentation	Star Trek: The Next Generation	"The Inner Light"	Won
