= Morgan Gendel =

American screenwriter and television producer

Morgan Adley Gendel (born 1952) is an American screenwriter and television producer from West Hartford, Connecticut.

== Career ==
Gendel served as co-executive producer for the fourth season of the CW sci-fi series, The 100. He has written for such television shows as Nash Bridges, Law & Order, and Star Trek: Deep Space Nine.

Gendel is perhaps best known for having written "The Inner Light", one of the most popular and lauded episodes of Star Trek: The Next Generation, for which he won the Hugo Award for Best Dramatic Presentation with Peter Allan Fields who wrote the final draft of the script and the episode's director Peter Lauritson. He was the first television writer to win the Hugo for the franchise in 22 years, since the original Star Trek television series received it in 1968 for Harlan Ellison's screenplay to "The City on the Edge of Forever".

As a producer, Gendel brought The Dresden Files novels to the screen as a TV series on the SciFi Channel. He produced the movie Frankenhood for Lionsgate and directed web series Pushed for The WB.com.

== Bibliography ==
- Alien shares a political strain with Andromeda - LA Times Article by Morgan Gendel
- Five Big Issues Raised by The Inner Light, Tor.com
- Interview with The Inner Light Writer Morgan Gendel, Trekcore.com
- Finding The Inner Light at the Star Trek Convention ArtsFuse.org
