= The Inner Light (Star Trek: The Next Generation) =

- Star Trek: The Next Generation episode
- Episode no.: Season 5 Episode 25
- Directed by: Peter Lauritson
- Story by: Morgan Gendel
- Teleplay by: Morgan Gendel; Peter Allan Fields
- Cinematography by: Marvin Rush
- Production code: 225
- Original air date: June 1, 1992

Guest appearances
- Margot Rose – Eline; Richard Riehle – Batai; Scott Jaeck – Ressik Administrator; Jennifer Nash – (adult) Meribor; Patti Yasutake – Alyssa Ogawa; Daniel Stewart – Batai, Son of Kamin

Episode chronology
| ← Previous "The Next Phase" | Next → "Time's Arrow" |
- Star Trek: The Next Generation season 5

"The Inner Light" is the 125th episode overall and the 25th and penultimate episode of the fifth season of the American science fiction television series Star Trek: The Next Generation. The episode was written by freelance writer Morgan Gendel based on his original pitch. It was partly inspired by the Beatles' song "The Inner Light", written by George Harrison and based on verses in the Tao Te Ching. Gendel is credited as writer of the story and co-writer of the teleplay with Peter Allan Fields. It was first broadcast on June 1, 1992.

Set in the 24th century, the series follows the adventures of the Starfleet crew of the Federation starship Enterprise-D. In this episode, Captain Jean-Luc Picard (Patrick Stewart) is struck unconscious by an energy beam from an alien probe. While just 25 minutes pass for the rest of the crew between Picard being struck unconscious and eventually regaining consciousness on the Enterprise bridge floor, the probe makes Picard experience 40 years of lifetime as Kamin, a humanoid scientist whose planet is threatened by the nova of its sun. The probe is later found to contain a flute, which Picard keeps as a memento.

The episode is widely considered by critics and fans as one of the best episodes of the entire Star Trek franchise. In 1993, "The Inner Light" won the Hugo Award for Best Dramatic Presentation. The flute melody, featured prominently in the episode, was composed by Jay Chattaway and has since been re-arranged for a full orchestra.

== Plot ==
On stardate 45944.1, the Enterprise-D finishes a magnetic wave survey of the Parvenium system and finds an unknown probe. The device rapidly scans the ship and directs an energy beam at Captain Picard, who wakes up to find himself on Kataan, a non-Federation planet. A woman, Eline, tells Picard that he is Kamin, an iron weaver recovering from a fever, and that she is his wife. Picard speaks of his life on the Enterprise but Eline and their close friend Batai convince Picard that his memories were only feverish dreams. Picard begins living his life as Kamin in his village, Ressik, having children with Eline and learning to play the flute. Kamin spends much time outdoors and with his Dobsonian telescope studying nature. As years pass, he begins to notice that radiation from the planet's sun is increasing, causing a drought. He sends reports to the planet's leaders, who seem to ignore his concerns.

On Enterprise, the crew continues attempts to revive Picard. They try to block the influence of the probe but Picard nearly dies, so they are forced to let it continue. They trace the rocket's trajectory to a system whose sun went nova 1,000 years before, rendering life extinct in the system.

Years pass and Kamin outlives Eline and Batai. Kamin and his daughter Meribor continue their study of the drought. They find that it is not temporary; the extinction of life on the planet is inevitable. Kamin confronts a government official who privately admits to him that they already know this but keep it secret to avoid panic. The official gravely points out to Kamin that they have only recently launched artificial satellites using primitive rockets: their race simply does not possess the technology to evacuate people before their planet is rendered uninhabitable. He does tell Kamin that a plan is in motion to preserve a record of their culture, but refuses to say more.

One day, while playing with his grandson, an elderly Kamin is summoned by his adult children to watch the launch of a rocket, which everyone seems to know about except him. Knowing that the destruction of the planet will occur soon, Kamin notes his sorrow that his grandson will not get to lead a full life. As he walks outside into the glaring nova light, Kamin sees Eline and Batai, as young as when he first saw them. They explain that he has already seen the rocket, just before he came there. Knowing that Kataan was doomed, its leaders placed memories of their society into a probe and launched it into space, in the hope that it would find someone who could tell others about their species. Picard realizes that he is the one the probe will find, and he has been experiencing these memories of life on Kataan as a typical member of its population.

Picard wakes up on the bridge of the Enterprise to discover that while he perceived many decades to have transpired, only 25 minutes have passed. The probe terminates and is brought aboard the Enterprise. Inside, the crew finds a small box. Riker gives the box to Picard, who opens it to find Kamin's flute. Picard, now adept at the instrument, plays a melody he learned during his life as Kamin.

== Title ==
Morgan Gendel named the episode after "The Inner Light", a song written by George Harrison and released by the Beatles as the B-side of their 1968 single "Lady Madonna". The lyrics of Harrison's song were based on the 47th chapter of the Tao Te Ching, which reads:

Without going outside his door, one understands (all that takes place) under the sky; without looking out from his window, one sees the Tao of Heaven. The farther that one goes out (from himself), the less he knows. Therefore the sages got their knowledge without travelling; gave their (right) names to things without seeing them; and accomplished their ends without any purpose of doing so.

According to Gendel, the song "captured the theme of the show: that Picard experienced a lifetime of memories all in his head."

== Ressikan flute ==
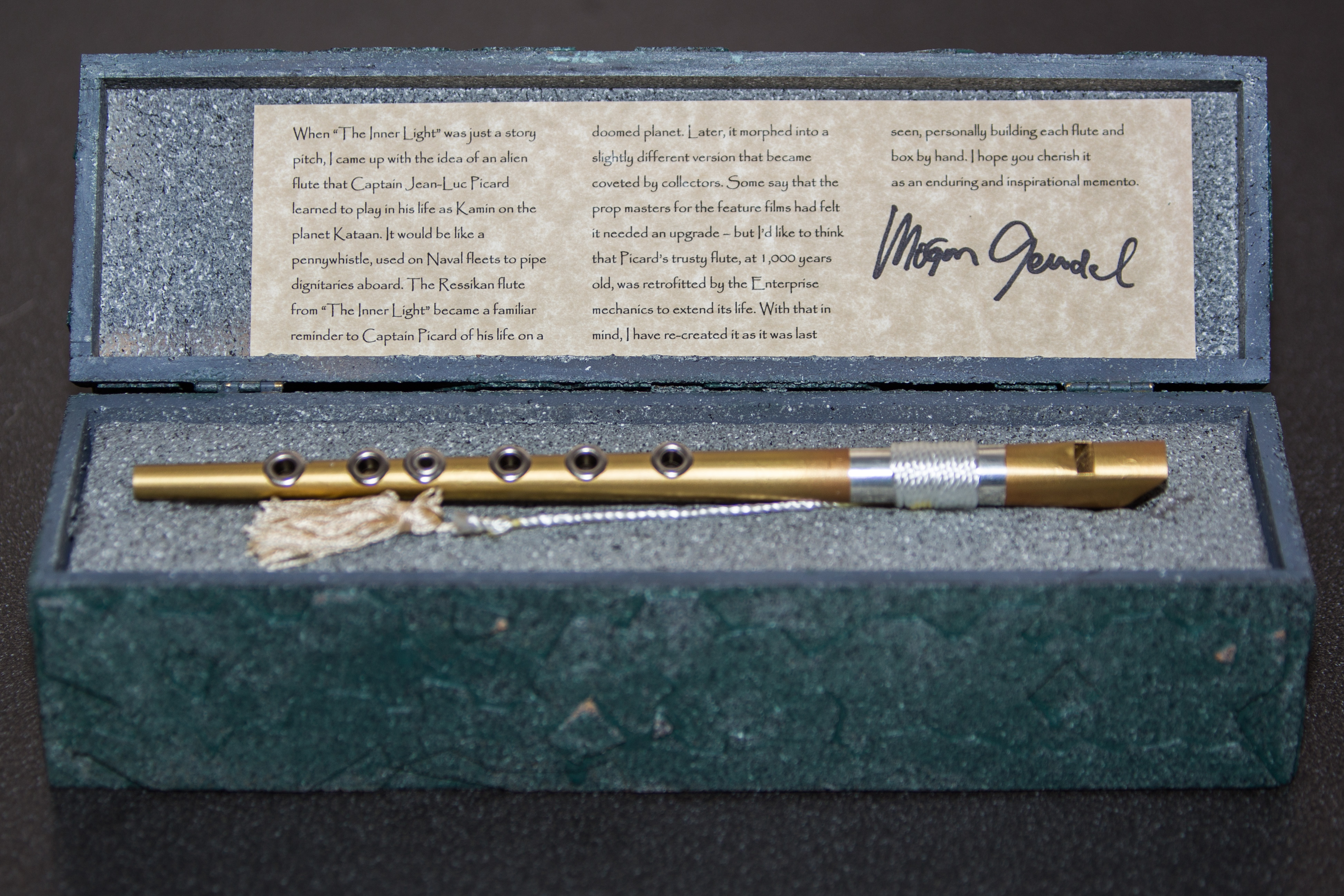
Replica of Ressikan flute by Morgan Gendel

The brass Ressikan flute resembles, and has a similar sound to, a penny whistle or a tin whistle. It is considered a lasting reminder of Picard's virtual life on the planet throughout the rest of the series. In episodes produced after "The Inner Light", the flute can occasionally be seen in its box sitting on his desk. It plays a role in the episode "Lessons", in which Picard develops a romantic relationship with a stellar cartographer assigned to the Enterprise, Nella Daren, an accomplished pianist who encourages his musical side and with whom he performs a duet version of the "Inner Light" theme. Earlier in the sixth season, a scene shows Picard practicing Mozart on the flute in the beginning of "A Fistful of Datas". It later appears in a deleted scene from Star Trek Nemesis; Lieutenant Commander Data picks it up and examines it while discussing human life with Picard. The original placement of this scene was to have been immediately following the wedding ceremony shown early in the film. The most recent appearance of the flute is in Star Trek: Picard, in which Picard picks up and observes the item among his belongings at his château.

A simple recurring theme that Picard plays on the flute was later developed into a full orchestral suite for the 30th anniversary of Star Trek. Another tune heard on the flute in "The Inner Light" was incorporated into the opening theme of Star Trek: Picard.

From October 5–7, 2006, the Ressikan flute and its storage box was one of the items up for bid at Christie's official studio auction of Star Trek memorabilia. The prop flute, which cannot actually be played, was originally estimated to have a sale price of US$300 (equivalent to $479 in 2025), and was thought to be a possible item for "[f]ans with more modest budgets", though auction directors admitted that their estimates for many items did not "factor in that emotional fury generated around this kind of material". The estimate was later raised to $800–$1,200 on Christie's web site. In the days leading up to the auction, Denise Okuda, former Trek scenic artist and video supervisor, as well as co-writer of the auction catalog, said: "That's the item people say they really have to have, because it's so iconic to a much-beloved episode." The final bid for the flute at the auction was US$40,000. Including the additional 20% fee Christie's collected on all items from the winning bidder, the total price for the flute was $48,000 (equivalent to $76,659 in 2025).

On June 29, 2021, the Ressikan flute, along with its storage box and a script from the episode, complete with costume continuity photos and handwritten notes, was auctioned during a Prop Store collectibles auction, with a pre-auction estimate of up to $70,000 (equivalent to $83,200 in 2025); the package sold for $190,000 (equivalent to $225,746 in 2025).

== Critical reception ==
The episode was the favorite episode of actor Patrick Stewart, who played Captain Jean-Luc Picard. Star Trek writer Susan Sackett notes that it is also her favorite episode even though it is not one she wrote.

In 2011, io9 ranked "The Inner Light" as the eighth best episode of all (then) six television series in the Star Trek franchise.

In 2015, The Hollywood Reporter noted this episode's presentation of Picard remembering his probe-life and quietly playing the Ressikan flute in his cabin, ranking it as the fifth "most stunning" moment of Star Trek: The Next Generation.

In 2016, marking the 50th anniversary of the first ever episode in the Star Trek franchise, "The Inner Light" received high recognition within the body of 725 episodes, over 30 seasons, of the then-aired first six television series in the franchise:

- The Hollywood Reporter ranked it the fourth best Star Trek episode.
- Empire ranked this the tenth best Star Trek episode.
- Radio Times said that Picard playing the flute at the end of the episode, having experienced the loving family life of Kamin, showed how "[n]ever has the dutiful captain looked so lonely", ranking it the sixth greatest scene in Star Trek television history.

In 2017:

- Variety listed it as the best episode of Star Trek: The Next Generation.
- Nerdist ranked this the second best episode of Star Trek: The Next Generation.
- Screen Rant rated it as the second most romantic episode of Star Trek, for the relationship between the Picard (as Kamin) and Eline characters.
- Fatherly ranked this as one of the top 10 episodes of Star Trek for kids to watch.
- Den of Geek ranked it as one of top 25 "must watch" episodes of Star Trek: The Next Generation.
- Vulture listed this as one of the best episodes of Star Trek: The Next Generation.

In 2018:

- Popular Mechanics listed it as one of the top 12 episodes for the Picard character, and also calls the climax "among the most stunning turns in any Star Trek script".
- Syfy.com noted the flute solo, composed by Jay Chattaway, as one of the famous pieces of music from Star Trek.

In 2019:

- Screen Rant ranked "The Inner Light" as one of the top ten important episodes to watch in preparation for the series Star Trek: Picard.
- The Hollywood Reporter listed this among the 25 best episodes of Star Trek: The Next Generation.

In 2020:

- "The Inner Light" was ranked the best episode of Star Trek: The Next Generation by 8,500 voters on Episode Hive.
- The Digital Fix said this was the second-best episode of Star Trek: The Next Generation, calling it a "rich, powerful, piece of storytelling" and praising Patrick Stewart's acting as Picard contending with an experience outside his usual job of Starship captain.

In 2021, Robert Vaux, writing for CBR, highlighted this episode among a trio of season five episodes (along with "The Perfect Mate" and "Darmok") that Patrick Stewart shone in. He points out the episode is "widely cited as one of the best Trek episodes of any kind".

== Awards and nominations ==
This episode won the 1993 Hugo Award for Best Dramatic Presentation. The award was given at the Worldcon in San Francisco. "The Inner Light" was the first television program to be so honored since the Star Trek original series episode "The City on the Edge of Forever" won in 1968. The other Hugo Award-winning Star Trek episodes are two different two-part episodes, The Original Series' "The Menagerie" and The Next Generation's series finale, "All Good Things...".

The episode was nominated at the 45th Primetime Emmy Awards for Outstanding Individual Achievement in Makeup for a Series, but lost to Star Trek: Deep Space Nine's "Captive Pursuit".

== Media releases ==
A DVD release came as part of The Best of Star Trek: The Next Generation – Volume 2 on November 17, 2009, in the United States.
