= Michelle Forbes =

American actress (born 1965)

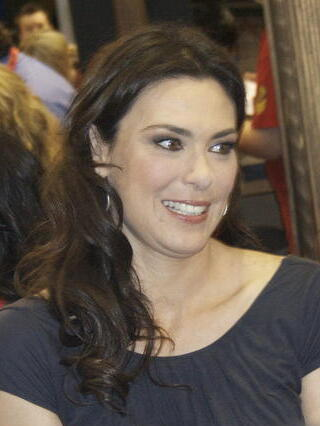
- Forbes at Comic-Con 2009
- Born: Michelle Renee Forbes Guajardo; January 8, 1965 (age 61); Austin, Texas, U.S.
- Occupation: Actress
- Years active: 1980–present
- Known for: Star Trek: The Next Generation; Homicide: Life on the Street; Guiding Light; True Blood; The Killing
- Spouse: Ross Kettle (m. 1990; div. 1999)
- Awards: Saturn Award

Michelle Renee Forbes Guajardo (born January 8, 1965) is an American actress who has appeared on television and in independent films. She is a Saturn Award winner with three nominations.

Forbes first garnered attention for her dual role in the daytime soap opera Guiding Light, for which she received a Daytime Emmy Award nomination. She is known for her recurring appearances on genre and drama shows, including Ensign Ro Laren in Star Trek: The Next Generation and Star Trek: Picard, and her regular role as medical examiner Julianna Cox on Homicide: Life on the Street during the 1990s. She played recurring roles throughout the 2000s in Battlestar Galactica, 24, In Treatment, Durham County, Prison Break and her series regular role as Maryann Forrester on True Blood. She has appeared in significant roles in films such as Escape from L.A., Kalifornia, Swimming with Sharks and Columbus.

She starred in the 2011–2012 AMC television series The Killing, for which she received a Primetime Emmy Award nomination. On June 18, 2019 it was announced that Forbes would join USA Network's action drama series Treadstone, a prequel/sequel to the Bourne franchise.

== Early life ==
Forbes was born in Austin, Texas, of Mexican American heritage.

Forbes hoped to become a ballet dancer. She began receiving formal acting training at the High School for the Performing and Visual Arts in Houston. While on vacation in New York City at the age of 16, she found herself auditioning for a film; although she was not selected, she signed with the William Morris Agency and began her professional acting career.

== Career ==
In 1987, at age 22, Forbes landed the contract role of Sonni Carrera Lewis on the daytime soap opera Guiding Light. The role was expanded to a dual role, with a second character, Solita Carrera, added. Forbes was a cast member for three years and in 1990 earned a Daytime Emmy Award nomination for her performance. She then continued in theater and began appearing in small guest roles on television to raise her profile. She went on to make guest appearances on a few other TV shows before landing the recurring role of Ensign Ro Laren in Star Trek: The Next Generation.

The producers of Star Trek: The Next Generation invited Forbes to reprise Ro in the spin-off series Star Trek: Deep Space Nine but Forbes declined the offer and decided to focus on a career in films. She received praise, as well as a Saturn Award nomination from the Academy of Science Fiction, Fantasy & Horror Films, for her performance as photographer Carrie Laughlin in the 1993 thriller Kalifornia. This was followed with the lead female role in the 1994 black comedy Swimming with Sharks as well as supporting roles in films such as Roadflower, Just Looking (1995), and John Carpenter's 1996 science fiction/action sequel Escape from L.A.

She continued performing on television during this period, with guest spots on Seinfeld, The Outer Limits and Star Trek: The Next Generation, to which she returned to tie up the Ro Laren storyline in the series' penultimate episode.

In 1995, she played one of the leads in J. S. Cardone's crime thriller Black Day Blue Night, alongside Mia Sara and Gil Bellows. The reviews for Black Day Blue Night were positive. Without breaking new grounds, they highlighted its strengths as a well-executed, low-budget noir with engaging performances. Greg Evans of Variety liked the film and of Forbes performance he said that it was "compellingly hard-bitten" and "outdistance the material."

In 1996, Forbes joined the cast of NBC's popular police drama Homicide: Life on the Street, playing chief medical examiner Julianna Cox. She remained with the show for two years then was let go as part of a major cast overhaul (the series was canceled after one more season). However, she reprised her role in the 2000 TV special Homicide: The Movie.

That same year, Forbes became a regular on the ABC series Wonderland but it was pulled from the air after only two episodes. Forbes was next seen in a recurring role on the police drama The District.

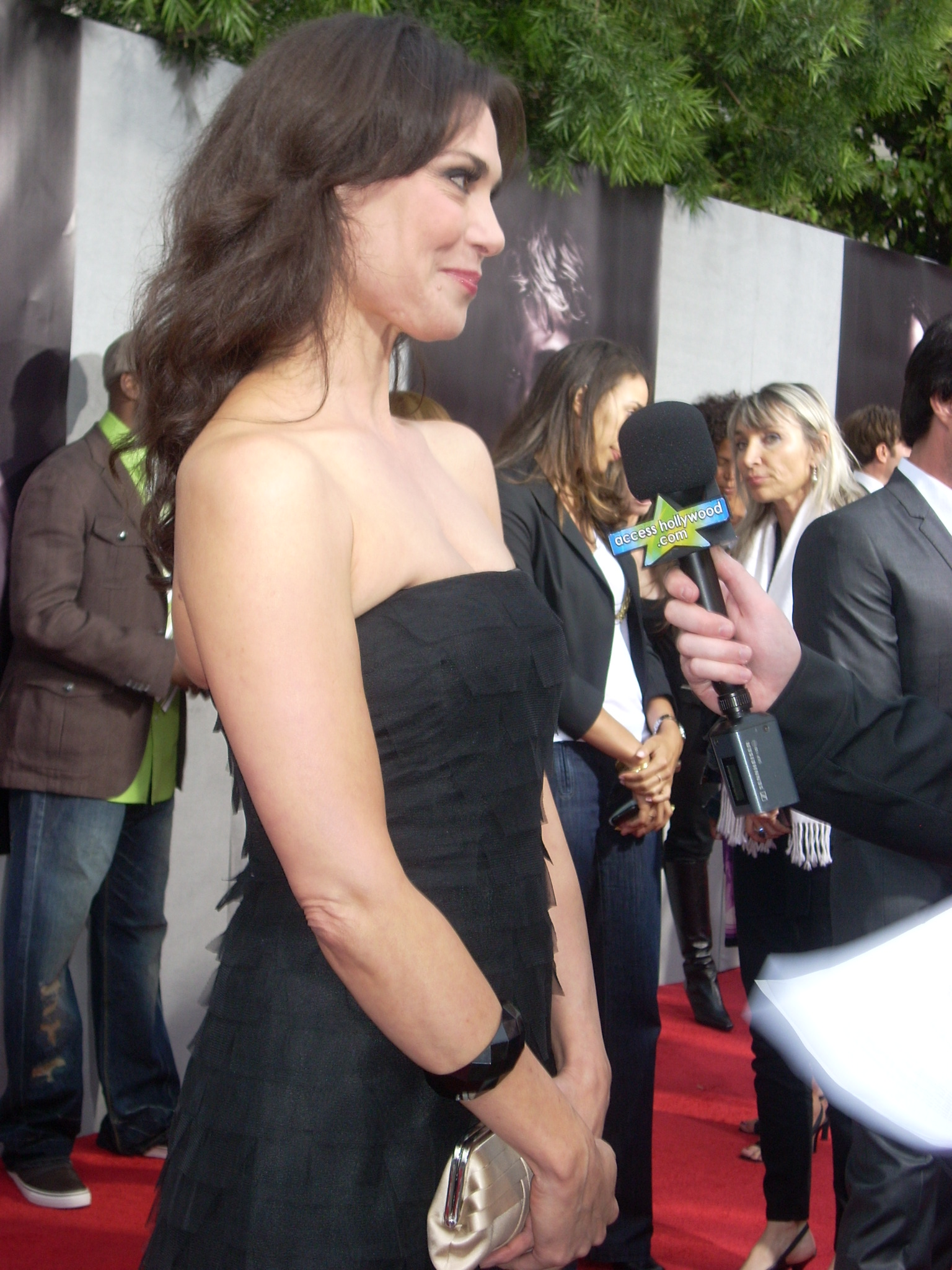
Forbes at the True Blood premiere party, June 2009

She was subsequently given roles in films such as 2001's Perfume and 2002's American Girl as well as the 2001 British television film Messiah (for which she studied British sign language for a week) and its sequel installments: Messiah 2: Vengeance is Mine in 2002 and Messiah III in 2003. During the 2002–2003 TV season, Forbes played the recurring character of presidential aide Lynne Kresge on the second season of the action series 24.

She followed her role on 24 with a guest spot on Alias then went on to play Admiral Helena Cain in three episodes of the re-imagining of the classic sci-fi series Battlestar Galactica as well as appearing in the television film Battlestar Galactica: Razor. She followed this up with a recurring role as Agent Samantha Brinker on the drama Prison Break and guest starred on Boston Legal and Lost.

Forbes starred as the lead in the adaptation of the comic-book Global Frequency, the single produced episode of which leaked online the following year, eight months after the series failed to be picked up by Warner Bros. networks.

Forbes returned to British television screens with guest roles in both Holby City and as a Mossad agent in Waking the Dead. In 2008, Forbes starred in two HBO drama series; In Treatment, portraying the wife of the central character, and in True Blood as a Maenad named Maryann Forrester.

She reprised her semi-regular roles in both series in their respective second seasons in 2009 as well as joining the cast of the Canadian psychological drama series Durham County for its second season as Dr. Penelope Verity.

Forbes played the role of Mitch Larsen in the American television series The Killing, a 2011 remake of the Danish crime series Forbrydelsen. Forbes appeared as Retro Girl in the TV series Powers. She also landed a prominent supporting role in The Hunger Games: Mockingjay – Part 2.

Forbes subsequently played Valerie Edwards in the TV series Berlin Station that aired on Epix from 2016 to 2019. Her character was a no-nonsense administrator who serves as a Berlin Station Internal branch chief.

She appeared in the first season of the ABC drama Big Sky as matriarch Margaret Kleinsasser followed by her appearance as Dr. Veronica Fuentes in the fourth season of New Amsterdam.

In 2023 Forbes reprised her role of Ro Laren in the 3rd season of Star Trek: Picard where the character was eventually killed by the Changelings in episode 5 "Imposters"

== Personal life ==
Forbes had been a vegetarian since her teenage years and became a vegan in 2011.

== Filmography ==
=== Film ===
Year	Title	Role	Notes
1993	Love Bites	Nerissa	
1993	Kalifornia	Carrie Laughlin	Nominated—Saturn Award for Best Actress
1994	Swimming with Sharks	Dawn Lockhard	
1994	Roadflower	Helen	
1995	Just Looking	Mary	
1995	The Chosen One	The Mother	
1995	Black Day Blue Night	Rinda Woolley	
1996	Escape from L.A.	Lieutenant Brazen	
1998	Dry Martini	Valeria	
2000	Bullfighter	Mary	
2001	Perfume	Francene	
2002	American Girl	Madge Grubb	
2004	Dandelion	Ms. Voss	
2004	Al Roach: Private Investigator	Dede Dragonfly	Voice role
2009	Diplomacy	US Secretary of State	
2013	Highland Park	Sylvia	
2013	The Hunters	Jordyn Flynn	
2015	The Hunger Games: Mockingjay – Part 2	Lieutenant Jackson	
2017	Columbus	Maria	
2017	Gemini	Jamie	
2017	Say You Will	Janis Nimitz	
2017	The Honor Farm		Uncredited

=== Television ===
Year	Title	Role	Notes
1987–1989	Guiding Light	Dr. 'Sonni' Carrera-Lewis	Unknown episodes Nominated—Daytime Emmy Award for Outstanding Supporting Actress in a Drama Series
1991	Father Dowling Mysteries	Gym Instructor	Episode: "The Fugitive Priest Mystery"
1991	Shannon's Deal	Maren	Episode: "The Inside Man"
1991	Star Trek: The Next Generation	Dara	Episode: "Half a Life"
1991–1994	Star Trek: The Next Generation	Ensign Ro Laren	Recurring role (Seasons 5–7)
1994	Seinfeld	Julie	Episode: "The Big Salad"
1996	The Outer Limits	Jamie Pratt	Episode: "A Stitch in Time"
1996	The Prosecutors	District Attorney Rachel Simone	TV movie
1996–1998	Homicide: Life on the Street	Dr. Julianna Cox	Main cast (Seasons 5–6); Nominated—Viewers for Quality Television Award for Best Supporting Actress in a Quality Drama Series
1998	Brimstone	Assistant District Attorney Julia Trent	Episode: "Executioner"
2000	The District	Helen York	Recurring role (Season 1)
2000	Homicide: Life Everlasting	Dr. Julianna Cox	TV movie
2000	Wonderland	Dr. Lyla Garrity	Main cast
2001–2004	Messiah	Susan Metcalfe	Main cast (Series 1–3)
2002	Strong Medicine	Assistant District Attorney Jill Sorenson	2 episodes
2002	Jackson County War	Rory Hammett	TV movie
2002	Fastlane	Lena	Episode: "Get Your Mack On"; uncredited
2002–2003	24	Lynne Kresge	Recurring role (Season 2); Nominated—Screen Actors Guild Award for Outstanding Performance by an Ensemble in a Drama Series
2004	Love is the Drug	Reena	3 episodes
2004	Global Frequency	Miranda Zero	Unsold pilot
2005	Alias	Dr. Maggie Sinclair	Episode: "Another Mister Sloane"
2005	The Inside	Zoya Petikof	Episode: "Thief of Hearts"
2005–2006	Battlestar Galactica	Admiral Helena Cain	Recurring role (Season 2)
2005–2006	Prison Break	Samantha Brinker	Recurring role (Season 1)
2006	Boston Legal	Juliette Monroe	Episode: "The Nutcrackers"
2007	Unthinkable	Jamie McDowell	TV movie
2007	Battlestar Galactica: Razor	Admiral Helena Cain	TV movie
2007–2008	Waking the Dead	Sarah	3 episodes
2008	Lost	Karen Decker	Episode: "There's No Place Like Home: Part 1"
2008–2009	In Treatment	Kate Weston	Main cast (Season 1)
2008–2009	True Blood	Maryann Forrester	Recurring role (Seasons 1–2); Satellite Award for Best Cast – Television Series; Nominated—Saturn Award for Best Guest Starring Role on Television; Nominated—Screen Actors Guild Award for Outstanding Performance by an Ensemble in a Drama Series
2009	Durham County	Dr. Pen Verrity	Main cast (Season 2)
2011–2012	The Killing	'Mitch' Larsen	Main cast (Seasons 1–2); Saturn Award for Best Supporting Actress on Television; Nominated—Critics' Choice Television Award for Best Supporting Actress in a Drama Series; Nominated—Primetime Emmy Award for Outstanding Supporting Actress in a Drama Series; Nominated—Satellite Award for Best Supporting Actress – Series, Miniseries or Television Film
2013	Chicago Fire	Gail McLeod	Recurring role (Season 2)
2014	Orphan Black	Dr. Marian Bowles	Recurring role (Season 2)
2014	Rake	Lucy Marks	Episode: "Jury Tamperer"
2015	Powers	Janis Sandusky / Retro Girl	Main cast (Season 1)
2015	The Returned	Helen Goddard	Recurring role
2016–2019	Berlin Station	Valerie Edwards	Main cast
2019	Grey's Anatomy	Vicki Ann Rudin	Episode: "Silent All These Years"
2019	Treadstone	Ellen Becker	Main cast
2021	Big Sky	Margaret Kleinsasser	Recurring role (Season 1)
2021–2022	New Amsterdam	Dr. Veronica Fuentes	Recurring role (Season 4)
2023	Star Trek: Picard	Commander Ro Laren	Episode: "Imposters"

=== Video games ===
Year	Title	Voice role
2004	Half-Life 2	Dr. Judith Mossman
2006	Half-Life 2: Episode One	Dr. Judith Mossman
2007	Half-Life 2: Episode Two	Dr. Judith Mossman
2009	The Chronicles of Riddick: Assault on Dark Athena	Captain Gail Revas
2011	DC Universe Online	Circe
2017	Wolfenstein II: The New Colossus	Zofia Blazkowicz
TBA	Star Trek: Shadow Frontier	Ro Laren

== Awards and nominations ==
Year	Award	Category	Production	Result
1990	Daytime Emmy Award	Outstanding Supporting Actress in a Drama Series	Guiding Light	Nominated
1990	Soap Opera Digest Award	Outstanding Daytime Villainess	Guiding Light	Nominated
1993	Saturn Award	Best Actress	Kalifornia	Nominated
2003	Screen Actors Guild Award	Outstanding Performance by an Ensemble in a Drama Series	24 (shared with the cast)	Nominated
2010	Saturn Award	Best Guest Starring Role in Television	True Blood	Nominated
2010	Screen Actors Guild Award	Outstanding Performance by an Ensemble in a Drama Series	True Blood (shared with the cast)	Nominated
2011	Primetime Emmy Award	Outstanding Supporting Actress in a Drama Series	The Killing	Nominated
2011	Critics' Choice Television Award	Best Supporting Actress in a Drama Series	The Killing	Nominated
2011	Saturn Award	Best Supporting Actress in Television	The Killing	Won
2023	Hollywood HCA Award	Best Guest Actress in a Drama Series	Star Trek: Picard	Nominated
