= Star Trek: The Next Generation season 4 =

1990–91 season of American television series

Star Trek: The Next Generation
- Season 4
- Region A/1 Blu-ray cover art
- No. of episodes: 26

Release
- Original network: Broadcast syndication
- Original release: September 24, 1990 – June 17, 1991

Season chronology
- ← Previous; Season 3 Next → Season 5

The fourth season of the American science fiction television series Star Trek: The Next Generation commenced airing in broadcast syndication in the United States on September 24, 1990, and concluded on June 17, 1991, after airing 26 episodes. Set in the 24th century, the series follows the adventures of the crew of the Starfleet starship Enterprise-D.

This season saw the show embracing the notion of serialized storylines. A recurring theme throughout the season is the notion of a brewing Duras-Romulan plot against the Federation, coupled with Worf's effort to reclaim his family honor. Both storylines were introduced in Season 3's "Sins of the Father". Worf's discommendation is a major theme in "Family" and "The Drumhead", while his dishonor and the Duras-Romulan plot take center stage in the episodes "Reunion", "The Mind's Eye", and "Redemption".

A second recurring storyline in the season is the growth of Miles O'Brien as a character. His first and middle name are revealed in "Family", he marries in "Data's Day", his past is revealed in "The Wounded", and his marriage is explored in "In Theory".

Season 4 featured many family-themed episodes. The first episode following "The Best of Both Worlds" deals with Picard and Worf's family, and the second with Data's. Worf's son Alexander appears later in the season, as does Tasha Yar's sister, and the Enterprise encounters an infant alien space entity.

While a stand-alone syndicated series, the series was paired with other shows for the two night syndicated programming block Hollywood Premiere Network from Chris-Craft TV and MCA TV.

== Cast ==
- Patrick Stewart as Captain Jean-Luc Picard
- Jonathan Frakes as Commander William T. Riker
- Brent Spiner as Lt. Cmdr. Data
- Gates McFadden as Dr. (Cmdr.) Beverly Crusher
- LeVar Burton as Lt. Cmdr. Geordi La Forge
- Marina Sirtis as Counselor (Lt. Cmdr.) Deanna Troi
- Michael Dorn as Lt. Worf
- Wil Wheaton as Ensign Wesley Crusher (episodes 1–9)

== Recurring characters ==
- Colm Meaney – Transporter Chief (Lt.) Miles O'Brien (14 episodes)
- Whoopi Goldberg – Guinan (7 episodes)
- Majel Barrett – Computer Voice (4 episodes)/Lwaxana Troi (1 episode)
- Patti Yasutake – Ensign Alyssa Ogawa (3 episodes)
- Rosalind Chao – Keiko O'Brien (4 episodes)
- Denise Crosby – Commander Sela (2 episodes)
- Pamela Winslow – Ensign McKnight (2 episodes)
- Robert O'Reilly – Gowron (2 episodes)
- John de Lancie – Q (1 episode)
- Dwight Schultz – Lt. Reginald Barclay (1 episode)
- Jon Paul Steuer – Alexander Rozhenko (1 episode)

== Episodes ==
In the following table, episodes are listed by the order in which they aired.

No. overall	No. in season	Title	Directed by	Written by	Original release date	Prod. code	Nielsen rating
75	1	"The Best of Both Worlds, Part II"	Cliff Bole	Michael Piller	September 24, 1990	175	12.3
Picard is rescued from the Borg as the Enterprise races to save Earth. Data interfaces with the half-Borg Picard and finds a way to shut down the Borg ship. Guest star Elizabeth Dennehy as Starfleet Commander Shelby.
76	2	"Family"	Les Landau	Ronald D. Moore	October 1, 1990	178	9.6
While the Enterprise is undergoing repairs at Earth, Captain Picard visits his brother's family in France, Lt. Worf's adoptive human parents come to see him aboard the ship, and Dr. Crusher gives her son Wesley a personal holo-recording left by his late father shortly after his birth.
77	3	"Brothers"	Rob Bowman	Rick Berman	October 8, 1990	177	10.9
Data is summoned by his creator Noonien Soong. They are joined by Data's brother, Lore.
78	4	"Suddenly Human"	Gabrielle Beaumont	Story by : Ralph Phillips; Teleplay by : John Whelpley and Jeri Taylor	October 15, 1990	176	10.3
Picard must help a human boy, raised by aliens, to decide his fate.
79	5	"Remember Me"	Cliff Bole	Lee Sheldon	October 22, 1990	179	11.4
After an apparent failure of a warp-field experiment, people begin to disappear from the Enterprise with only Dr. Crusher remembering that they ever existed.
80	6	"Legacy"	Robert Scheerer	Joe Menosky	October 29, 1990	180	12.0
Tasha Yar's sister Ishara seeks to restore order on their conflict-ridden colony world.
81	7	"Reunion"	Jonathan Frakes	Story by : Drew Deighan and Thomas Perry & Jo Perry; Teleplay by : Thomas Perry & Jo Perry and Ronald D. Moore & Brannon Braga	November 5, 1990	181	12.2
Worf's former lover returns, and along with Picard, the two mediate a Klingon power dispute. Worf discovers more family.
82	8	"Future Imperfect"	Les Landau	J. Larry Carroll & David Bennett Carren	November 12, 1990	182	12.0
Riker finds himself sixteen years in the future. His memory of the interim is erased by a dormant virus.
83	9	"Final Mission"	Corey Allen	Story by : Kacey Arnold-Ince; Teleplay by : Kacey Arnold-Ince & Jeri Taylor	November 19, 1990	183	11.5
Wesley sets off on his final mission with the Enterprise accompanied by Picard. They become stranded on a desert planet.
84	10	"The Loss"	Chip Chalmers	Teleplay by : Hilary J. Bader and Allan J. Adler & Vanessa Greene; Story by : Hilary J. Bader	December 31, 1990	184	12.2
An unknown force captures the Enterprise and causes Deanna to lose her empathic powers.
85	11	"Data's Day"	Robert Wiemer	Story by : Harold Apter; Teleplay by : Harold Apter and Ronald D. Moore	January 7, 1991	185	11.7
Data gets dancing lessons from Dr. Crusher in preparation of Chief O'Brien's wedding as the Enterprise brings Ambassador T'Pel to the Romulans for negotiations.
86	12	"The Wounded"	Chip Chalmers	Story by : Stuart Charno & Sara Charno and Cy Chermak; Teleplay by : Jeri Taylor	January 28, 1991	186	12.1
A rogue Starfleet Captain (Bob Gunton) jeopardizes the Cardassian peace treaty.
87	13	"Devil's Due"	Tom Benko	Story by : Philip LaZebnik & William Douglas Lansford; Teleplay by : Philip LaZebnik	February 4, 1991	187	13.0
A powerful mythic figure from a millennium ago returns to enslave a planet in accordance with a contract. However, Picard is convinced she is an opportunistic charlatan. Guest star Marta DuBois as Ardra.
88	14	"Clues"	Les Landau	Story by : Bruce D. Arthurs; Teleplay by : Bruce D. Arthurs and Joe Menosky	February 11, 1991	188	12.3
The crew, with the exception of Data, is rendered unconscious for 30 seconds after going through a localized wormhole. However, various clues suggest they were unconscious for an entire day.
89	15	"First Contact"	Cliff Bole	Teleplay by : Dennis Bailey (Note: Credited as Dennis Russell Bailey) & David Bischoff and Joe Menosky & Ronald D. Moore and Michael Piller; Story by : Marc Scott Zicree	February 18, 1991	189	11.4
Riker is hospitalized during a botched pre-first contact mission. Xenophobia results in increasing hostility toward his presence.
90	16	"Galaxy's Child"	Winrich Kolbe	Story by : Thomas Kartozian; Teleplay by : Maurice Hurley	March 11, 1991	190	11.7
The Enterprise accidentally kills a space creature, and the crew rush to save its unborn offspring. Meanwhile, Geordi meets the engineer he fell in love with and finds to his shock that she is nothing like the woman he encountered on the holodeck. Guest star: Susan Gibney as Dr. Leah Brahms.
91	17	"Night Terrors"	Les Landau	Story by : Shari Goodhartz; Teleplay by : Pamela Douglas & Jeri Taylor	March 18, 1991	191	11.2
The Enterprise is trapped in a rift, the crew succumbs to REM sleep deprivation, and Deanna has a recurring nightmare.
92	18	"Identity Crisis"	Winrich Kolbe	Story by : Timothy DeHaas; Teleplay by : Brannon Braga	March 25, 1991	192	10.9
Geordi transforms into an alien creature with a strong instinct to return to its planet of origin.
93	19	"The Nth Degree"	Robert Legato	Joe Menosky	April 1, 1991	193	11.0
After an encounter with an alien probe, Barclay experiences great leaps in confidence and intelligence.
94	20	"Qpid"	Cliff Bole	Story by : Randee Russell and Ira Steven Behr; Teleplay by : Ira Steven Behr	April 22, 1991	194	10.8
Q returns to test Picard's love for an old flame.
95	21	"The Drumhead"	Jonathan Frakes	Jeri Taylor	April 29, 1991	195	10.5
A witchhunt ensues for suspected Romulan spies aboard the Enterprise. Guest star Jean Simmons as Rear Admiral Norah Satie.
96	22	"Half a Life"	Les Landau	Story by : Ted Roberts and Peter Allan Fields; Teleplay by : Peter Allan Fields	May 6, 1991	196	Unknown
Lwaxana Troi finally finds love but discovers her man must undergo a ritualistic suicide. Guest star David Ogden Stiers as Timicin.
97	23	"The Host"	Marvin V. Rush	Michel Horvat	May 13, 1991	197	11.3
Dr. Crusher falls in love with Odan, a peace negotiator, only to discover that he is a symbiont. When his original host dies, he is implanted into Riker temporarily to finish his negotiations.
98	24	"The Mind's Eye"	David Livingston	Story by : Ken Schafer and René Echevarria; Teleplay by : René Echevarria	May 27, 1991	198	10.1
The Romulans brainwash Geordi to carry out a covert mission.
99	25	"In Theory"	Patrick Stewart	Joe Menosky & Ronald D. Moore	June 3, 1991	199	9.8
Data participates in a romantic relationship with a fellow crew member.
100	26	"Redemption, Part I"	Cliff Bole	Ronald D. Moore	June 17, 1991	200	10.9
Worf leaves the Enterprise to fight on behalf of Gowron in a Klingon civil war.

== Home media ==
Star Trek: The Next Generation – Season 4
Set details		Special features	
Episodes: 26; Discs: 7 (DVD) / 6 (Blu-Ray); Aspect Ratio: 1.33:1; Subtitles: Danish, Dutch, English, French, German, Italian, Japanese, Norwegian, Spanish, Swedish; Dubbed: French, German, Italian, Japanese, Spanish		DVD and Blu-ray: Mission Overview: Year Four; Selected Crew Analysis: Year Four; Departmental Briefing, Year Four: Production; New Life and New Civilizations; Chronicles from the Final Frontier	
Release dates
DVD		Blu-ray	
Region 1	Region 2	United States (Region free)	United Kingdom (Region free)
Unknown	Unknown	Unknown	Unknown

== Reception ==
In 2019, CBR rated Season 4 of Star Trek: The Next Generation as the 12th best season of all Star Trek seasons up to that time.
