= In Theory =

- Star Trek: The Next Generation episode
- Episode no.: Season 4 Episode 25
- Directed by: Patrick Stewart
- Written by: Joe Menosky; Ronald D. Moore
- Production code: 199
- Original air date: June 3, 1991

Guest appearances
- Michele Scarabelli – Jenna D'Sora; Rosalind Chao – Keiko O'Brien; Colm Meaney – Miles O'Brien; Pamela Winslow – Ensign McKnight; Whoopi Goldberg – Guinan

Episode chronology
| ← Previous "The Mind's Eye" | Next → "Redemption I" |
- Star Trek: The Next Generation season 4

"In Theory" is the 25th episode of the fourth season of the American science fiction television series Star Trek: The Next Generation, originally aired on June 3, 1991, in broadcast syndication. The episode was written by Joe Menosky and Ronald D. Moore and was the directorial debut of cast member Patrick Stewart.

Set in the 24th century, the series follows the adventures of the Starfleet crew of the Federation starship Enterprise-D. In this episode, Data (Brent Spiner), an android on the Enterprise crew, accepts the affections of shipmate Jenna D'Sora (Michele Scarabelli) and pursues a romantic relationship with her. However, Jenna soon comprehends the downside of a relationship with a partner who does not experience human emotions. As the couple attempts to work out their problems, the Enterprise moves into an area of space rendered deadly by a nebula that is tearing small gaps in the fabric of space, deforming any matter that comes into contact with them.

"In Theory" received Nielsen ratings of 9.8 percent, making it the second least viewed episode of the fourth season on first broadcast. Reviewers were ambivalent about the episode. They criticized elements of the plot, such as the choice of Captain Jean-Luc Picard to pilot a shuttle in a subplot instead of an experienced shuttle pilot, and felt that Data's romance was ineffective. Keith DeCandido had the view that it was a re-hash of the second season episode "The Dauphin".

== Plot ==
While configuring probes to explore a nearby nebula, Data and Jenna D'Sora discuss the latter's lingering feelings for her ex-boyfriend. Data attempts to comfort her, but does not notice her developing affection for him. After another work session, she kisses him on the cheek and then on the lips before leaving. Data seeks the opinion of his friends, including Captain Jean-Luc Picard (Patrick Stewart), Guinan (Whoopi Goldberg), Geordi La Forge (LeVar Burton), Commander William Riker (Jonathan Frakes), Deanna Troi (Marina Sirtis) and Worf (Michael Dorn), about the advisability of attempting to pursue a romantic relationship with D'Sora. Soon, Data goes to D'Sora's cabin with a bunch of flowers, and he informs her that he has created a romantic subroutine for the relationship. Later, D'Sora visits Data's cabin with a gift, but is frustrated by Data's lack of understanding of how to interact with her in an affectionate manner. At Data's next visit with D'Sora, he acts erratically, trying to find an appropriate response to make her happy.

Meanwhile, as the Enterprise explores the nebula, numerous odd phenomena occur on the ship: objects fall off of tables; Data's cat Spot escapes from his quarters; the observation lounge briefly depressurizes. When the ship approaches the coordinates of a planet, they find nothing there. It becomes evident that the nebula is causing distortions in space; Picard orders the ship to leave the nebula as quickly as possible, but this speeds up the distortions. Data discovers that pockets of dark matter are causing the distortions. The ship can detect the pockets at short range, but not in enough time to move out of the way. Worf proposes using a shuttle to lead the Enterprise out, and Picard insists on piloting it alone. Picard pilots the shuttle through the field of distortion pockets, and the Enterprise follows closely behind. Chief Miles O'Brien (Colm Meaney) transports the Captain back to the ship before the shuttle is destroyed; the ship is now close enough to the edge of the nebula to leave without further damage.

Afterwards, D'Sora reveals to Data over a romantic dinner in his quarters that she broke up with her boyfriend because he was emotionally unavailable, and then pursued Data because he was the same. Data realizes that she is breaking up with him and responds that he will delete the subroutine. D'Sora departs and Data is seemingly unperturbed, although Spot jumps into his lap as if to comfort him.

== Production ==
"In Theory" marked the directorial debut of cast member Patrick Stewart. Stewart sought the advice of fellow cast member Jonathan Frakes prior to filming, as Frakes had already directed three episodes of The Next Generation, making Stewart the second cast member to do so. Frakes thought that Stewart did a good job, saying that "he was fabulous and took to it beautifully".

The story was written by Joe Menosky and Ronald D. Moore, who were the show's two executive story editors during season four. The guest stars included Michele Scarabelli, who had previously appeared as Susan on Alien Nation. Pamela Winslow appeared as Ensign McKnight, who had previously been referred to in the episode "Clues" but not seen on screen.

== Reception ==
The episode aired during the week commencing June 3, 1991, in broadcast syndication. According to Nielsen Media Research, it received ratings of 9.8 percent. This means that it was watched by 9.8 percent of all households watching television during its timeslot. It was the second lowest viewed episode of the season on first broadcast, only ahead of "Family". Both of those episodes were the only ones in season four to receive ratings under 10 percent.

Several reviewers re-watched the episode after the end of the series. Zack Handlen watched the episode for The A.V. Club in February 2011. He thought that the two plots didn't tie in together but said of the episode that "while I didn't exactly love it, I'm happy it exists". He thought that the scenes with D'Sora and Data were "very, very odd", and that the ending didn't reveal anything new about Data at all. The subplot involving the nebula was described as "an interesting hook, but it doesn't go anywhere". He gave the episode a B grade. Jamahl Epsicokhan at his website Jammer's Reviews described the main plot as "pleasant enough" but couldn't understand D'Sora's motivations in pursuing the relationship with Data. He described the subplot as "pure perfunctory filler barely worthy of mention" and didn't know why Picard piloted the shuttle instead of a more experienced shuttle pilot. He gave the episode a score of 2.5/4.

Michelle Erica Green watched the episode for TrekNation in May 2009. She also thought that it was a pleasant episode but that it "never approaches greatness". She felt that D'Sora never achieved the intimacy that Tasha Yar did with Data, and that the subplot was simply something created so that Picard had something to do. She summed up the ending of the episode by saying that "I don't believe that Data can't be hurt emotionally, but he's more invested in his cat than he ever seems to be in Jenna D'Sora." Keith DeCandido reviewed the episode for Tor.com in May 2012, describing it as a "clunker" and a re-hash of the earlier episode "The Dauphin" but "without the gravitas". He thought that having Picard pilot the shuttle was ridiculous, especially as the character admitted in the episode "11001001" that it had been years since he had worked the helm of a ship. He summed it up saying that, "ultimately, it's a rehash of a Wesley Crusher episode. A really really bad Wesley Crusher episode" and gave it a score of two out of ten.

In 2019, Den of Geek noted this episode for featuring a romance story. In 2019, Screen Rant ranked "In Theory" the fifth funniest episode of Star Trek: The Next Generation.

== Home media release ==
The first home media release of "In Theory" was on VHS cassette, appearing on September 5, 1991, in the United States and Canada. The episode was later released on LaserDisc on September 24, 1996, and also included on the Star Trek: The Next Generation season four DVD box set, released in the United States on September 3, 2002. It was also one of the episodes included in the anthology DVD box set Star Trek Fan Collective - Captain's Log, for which it was picked by Patrick Stewart; the set also includes the TNG episodes "Chain of Command" (Parts I & II) and "Darmok" among other episodes from the franchise.

The first Blu-ray release was in the United Kingdom on July 29, 2013, followed by the United States on July 30.
