= The Best of Both Worlds (Star Trek: The Next Generation) =

Two-part episode bridging seasons 3–4

- Star Trek: The Next Generation episodes
- Blu-ray release cover
- Episode nos.: Season 3 and 4 Episodes 26 and 1
- Directed by: Cliff Bole
- Written by: Michael Piller
- Cinematography by: Marvin Rush
- Production codes: 174 and 175
- Original air dates: June 18, 1990; September 24, 1990

Guest appearances
- Colm Meaney as Miles O'Brien; Elizabeth Dennehy as Lt. Commander Shelby; George Murdock as Admiral J.P. Hanson; Whoopi Goldberg as Guinan; Majel Barrett as Computer Voice

Episode chronology
← Previous "Transfigurations"	Next → "Family"
- Star Trek: The Next Generation season 3

"The Best of Both Worlds" is the 26th episode of the third season and the first episode of the fourth season of the American science fiction television series Star Trek: The Next Generation. It comprises the 74th and 75th episodes of the series overall. The first part was originally aired on June 18, 1990, and the second on September 24, 1990, in broadcast syndication television.

Set in the 24th century, the series follows the adventures of the Starfleet crew of the Federation starship Enterprise-D. In this two part episode, the Enterprise must battle the Borg who are intent on conquering Earth, with a captured and assimilated Captain Picard as their emissary. Part 1 was the finale to season three, while Part 2 was the premiere of season four. It is considered one of the most popular Star Trek episodes.

In April 2013, "The Best of Both Worlds" was re-released edited together as a single feature film, released on Blu-ray disc and shown as a one-night only event in movie theaters.

== Plot ==
=== Part I ===
The Starship Enterprise responds to a distress call from the Federation colony on Jouret IV and arrives to discover the colony gone. The Federation suspect the Borg—a hive mind of cybernetic humanoids.

Starfleet Admiral Hanson arrives on board the Enterprise with Lieutenant Commander Shelby, an expert on the Borg, who assists the crew in determining the cause of the colony's disappearance. Hanson informs Captain Picard that Commander Riker has been offered the command of the Starship Melbourne and suggests that Riker take the position, having turned it down twice previously. Shelby's research confirms that the colony was destroyed by the Borg. Tension emerges between Riker and the ambitious Shelby, who wants to take over his position as first officer; at one point, Shelby goes over Riker's head to suggest to Picard that the Enterprise split into its component saucer and stardrive sections, after Riker rejects the idea.

Hanson advises Picard that another Federation vessel encountered a strange "cube shaped" vessel before sending a distress call that ended abruptly. Enterprise moves to intercept and confronts a Borg cube. The Borg demand that Picard surrender himself, which he refuses. The Borg lock the vessel in a tractor beam and begin cutting into the hull. Shelby suggests randomly changing the frequency of the ship's phasers to prevent the Borg from adapting to the attack, which frees the vessel. The Enterprise escapes to a nearby nebula, where Chief Engineer Geordi La Forge and Ensign Wesley Crusher adapt a technique suggested by Shelby to modify the ship's deflector dish to fire a massive energy discharge capable of destroying the Borg cube. The Borg flush Enterprise from the nebula, board the ship, and abduct Picard. The Borg Cube moves at high warp speed towards Earth, with Enterprise in pursuit.

"I am Locutus of Borg. Resistance is futile.
Your life as it has been is over. From this time forward, you will service... us."

— Locutus

Riker, now in command of the ship, prepares to join an away team to board the Cube to rescue Picard, but Counselor Troi reminds him his place is now on the bridge. Shelby leads the away team onto the Borg cube, where they are ignored by the Borg drones. The team locate Picard's uniform and communicator and destroy power nodes inside the cube, forcing it out of warp. As the team prepares to transport back to Enterprise, they see Picard, with cybernetic attachments turning him into a Borg drone. The Borg contact Enterprise, speaking through Picard; he identifies himself as "Locutus of Borg" and tells them that "Resistance is futile." Riker orders Worf to fire the deflector dish.

=== Part II ===
The deflector dish discharge has no effect on the Borg cube; Locutus reveals that the Borg prepared for the attack using Picard's knowledge. The Borg cube continues at warp speed towards Earth, with the crippled Enterprise unable to follow. Upon reporting their failure to Hanson, Riker is promoted to captain and makes Shelby his first officer. The crew learns that a fleet of starships is massing at Wolf 359 to stop the Borg. Guinan, the Enterprise's bartender and Picard's friend, suggests to Riker that he "let go of Picard", since Picard's knowledge is being used to thwart Starfleet tactics, in order to defeat the Borg and possibly save Picard's life.

The Enterprise arrives at Wolf 359 to find the fleet has been destroyed, including the Melbourne. It follows the cube's warp trail to an intercept point, where Riker offers to negotiate with Locutus. The request is denied, but the communication reveals Locutus's location within the cube. Riker orders the Enterprise to separate into saucer and stardrive sections—but contrary to Shelby's original suggestion, Riker orders the saucer section rather than the stardrive to fire an anti-matter spread on the cube, disrupting its sensors so that a shuttlecraft piloted by Lieutenant Commander Data and Lt. Worf can bypass the Borg shields, allowing them to transport aboard the cube. They kidnap Locutus, although the Borg ignore this and continue to Earth.

Data and Dr. Crusher create a neural link with Locutus to gain access to the Borg's collective consciousness. Data attempts to use the link to disable the Borg's weapons and defensive systems, but cannot, as they are protected by security protocols. Picard breaks free from Borg control enough to mutter, "sleep". Data realizes that Picard is suggesting accessing the Borg regeneration subroutines, which are less protected than key systems like weapons or power. Data issues a command to the Borg to enter sleep mode, causing their weapons and shields to deactivate. A feedback loop builds in the Borg cube, which destroys the vessel. Dr. Crusher and Data remove the Borg implants and augmentations from Picard.

The Enterprise is awaiting repairs at an orbital shipyard, and Riker, although offered command of his own ship, insists on remaining as first officer. Shelby is reassigned to a task force dedicated to rebuilding the fleet. Picard recovers, but is still disturbed by his ordeal.

== Production ==
=== Development ===
Executive producer Michael Piller was in charge of the writer's room and decided he wanted the series to take some risks, and that the season would end on a cliffhanger, something Star Trek had not done before. The producers also wanted a cliffhanger because of contract problems with various actors and uncertainty over who would return. Although audiences may have seen it as a Picard episode, Piller considered it to be a Riker-centric episode and he related the character's quandary over whether or not to leave the Enterprise to his own experiences as an executive producer on Star Trek. Piller felt ready to move on rather than remain second in command, but he was persuaded to stay by Gene Roddenberry and Rick Berman.

Piller wrote "Part I" with no idea how "Part II" would end, and said "we're going to figure it out next season." When production for season four began, there was an almost entirely new writing staff and they worked together in the writer's room to break the story. Writer Ronald D. Moore felt that "Part II" had a little too much technobabble, and was not as satisfying as the first half.

During the writing process on the episodes, Piller worked with Moore, who wrote the following episode "Family". The two writers considered "Family" to be the final installment of "The Best of Both Worlds" as a trilogy. Initially, there was no plan to have an episode reflecting on the ongoing effects on Picard after the traumatic events of the two-parter, but after Piller raised the issue with Roddenberry and Berman, it was agreed to be added as long as it included a science fiction story. Instead, Moore and Piller agreed to have three family stories contained in the episode which would resonate with each other.

=== Makeup and props ===
Makeup supervisor Michael Westmore said it took many makeup artists and a lot of time to create the Borg. At that time the process took at least three hours to apply the makeup and costumes. They had it organized into a production line to make it as fast as possible. He found that results were inconsistent as each makeup artist used different techniques to shade the faces. This laborious process prompted Westmore to take an airbrush course, allowing for more consistent results and after that he insisted that any makeup artist hired knew how to use an airbrush.

Alan Sims was in charge of props, and designed the remote control Borg prosthetic arms. The head mounted laser on Patrick Stewart's costume was a $200 laser that Michael Westmore, Jr. had acquired and had not been used in television production previously.

=== Special effects ===
The Borg cube was created by visual effects coordinator Gary Hutzel using parts from off-the-shelf model kits. The show was not using CGI and all the space ship models in the show had to be built. The budget was limited and because they could not afford to have a model maker construct it for them, Hutzel built it himself. He stapled chickenwire to a framework and then stuck boards covered in the various bits to it. For the climactic explosion in "Part II" a pyrotechnician rigged the cube with primer cord. The stage was cleared before detonation but it exploded like a grenade and shards were embedded in the stage walls. Visual effects coordinator Judy Elkins suggested using toys and model kits to expand the fleet, and they invited various people from the art department and other people on the show for a kit bash. They were allowed to modify the ships however they wanted and give the ships their own names. Hutzel said, "We were able to get quite a few ships made that way with pretty minimal effort and money. I rigged them all with internal lighting to make them look like they are on fire and we shot them that way. The toy company gave them to us for free."

=== Music ===
The musical score was composed and conducted by Ron Jones and eventually released as an album in 1991. Jones composed similar cliffhanger music for the 100th episode of Family Guy, "Stewie Kills Lois" as Seth MacFarlane and David A. Goodman had wanted to use the actual music, but couldn't get the rights from Paramount.

The album was re-released in 2013 as a two-part, extended edition by GNP Crescendo Records [GNPD 8083], to include previously unreleased material by Jones.

== Broadcast and release ==
Part I was originally broadcast on syndicated television starting on June 18, 1990, then Part II was broadcast starting on September 24, 1990. Many watchers note the frustration of having to wait to see the conclusion.

On October 3, 1995 "Best of Both Worlds, Part I" and "Transfigurations" were released on LaserDisc in the United States. On February 27, 1996 "Best of Both Worlds, Part II" and "Suddenly Human" were released on LaserDisc in the USA. In June 1996, both parts of "Best of Both Worlds" were released in the United Kingdom on a PAL-format LaserDisc, with a Dolby Surround audio track. Both parts were released on a PAL-format LaserDisc in Germany also, cover title "Angriffsziel Erde" with a German language dubbed audio track.

"Part I" of the episode was released with Star Trek: The Next Generation season three DVD box set, released in the United States on July 2, 2002. "Part II" was later released in the United States on September 3, 2002, as part of the Star Trek: The Next Generation season four DVD box set. Both sets have a Dolby Digital 5.1 audio track for "Best of Both Worlds". "The Best of Both Worlds" has also been released on DVD, such as in the 14-episode collection, Star Trek Fan Collective - Borg in 2006, and on VHS tapes as well.

The two episodes, prepped for Blu-ray optical video disc release and to promote the release of the third season Blu-ray, were combined with interviews and outtakes and shown as a one-night only event in movie theaters across the US and Canada on the night of April 25, 2013. In this version, the short summary of Part I at the start of Part II is removed and there is no second opening credits montage. The 90-minute single also has some special features and audio commentary available for the episode. A review of the Blu-Ray release noted that it was a "better-than-average Star Trek adventure" noting the difficulties faced by Riker (played by Jonathan Frakes) as well as the featurette and extras.

== Reception ==
The first episode won Emmy Awards for "Outstanding Art Direction for a Series" and "Outstanding Sound Editing for a Series".

The storyline appeared in TV Guide's "100 Most Memorable Moments in TV History" (July 1, 1996), ranked number 50. The episode was also ranked #70 on "The 100 Greatest TV Episodes of All Time". Part I was ranked eighth on the top ten Star Trek episodes for the magazine's celebration of the franchise's 30th anniversary.

In 2012, Keith R.A. DeCandido of Tor.com rewatched the episodes. He rated the first part ten out of ten, and the second part six out of ten.

This episode has continued to be widely praised. It was listed as the best in the series by Empire in 2008. In 2016, The Washington Post ranked it the best episode of all Star Trek and said it had the greatest cliffhanger in television history. Riker's line "Mr. Worf: Fire" was described by TheWrap as one of the greatest cliffhangers in television history. The Hollywood Reporter in 2016 ranked "The Best of Both Worlds" as the second-greatest episode across all Star Trek series. In 2009, the episode was ranked #36 on TV Guide's list of "TV's Top 100 Episodes of All Time".

Lt. Commander Shelby as a character has also been praised. In 2017, Den of Geek ranked Elizabeth Dennehy's role in "The Best of Both Worlds" (Parts I and II) as one of the top ten guest roles on Star Trek: The Next Generation. They remark that Elizabeth Dennehy does a great job of holding her own with the rest of the cast and portraying a capable officer. In 2016, Wired ranked her as the 56th most important character of Starfleet within the Star Trek science fiction universe including both films and television series.

In 2017, Netflix announced that both parts of "The Best of Both Worlds" were in the four Star Trek: The Next Generation episodes (Note: Star Trek: The Next Generation was also represented on the list by "Clues" and "Q Who". When compiling its top ten list, Netflix purposely excluded the series premiere and second episode from each of the then-six series in the franchise, in order to "seek data beyond default behavior".) in the top ten most re-watched Star Trek franchise episodes on its streaming service, based on data since the franchise was added to Netflix in 2011.

In 2018, Entertainment Weekly ranked "The Best of Both Worlds" as one of the top ten moments of Jean-Luc Picard.

Space.com recommended in 2020 watching this episode as background for Star Trek: Picard. Also, Games Radar recommended watching this episode before that series. In 2020, SyFy Wire listed this episode in their guide "Best of Borg Worlds" as one of seven essential Borg-themed episodes to watch as background before Star Trek: Picard. In 2020, Screen Rant ranked "Best of Both Worlds" the 12th best episode of all Star Trek franchise television episodes up to that time, and in 2021 said it was the best Borg episode based on an IMDB rating of 9.4 out of 10 at that time. In 2019, they had said the two-part episode was "one of the finest stories in all of science fiction," and noting it as a powerful use of the show's "cybernetic hive race". In 2020, The Digital Fix determined this was the best episode of Star Trek: The Next Generation.

== See also ==
- "Emissary (Star Trek: Deep Space Nine)", which begins with the Battle of Wolf 359
