= Brothers (Star Trek: The Next Generation) =

- Star Trek: The Next Generation episode
- Episode no.: Season 4 Episode 3
- Directed by: Rob Bowman
- Written by: Rick Berman
- Cinematography by: Marvin Rush
- Production code: 177
- Original air date: October 8, 1990

Guest appearances
- Cory Danziger - Jake Potts; Colm Meaney - Miles O'Brien; Adam Ryen - Willie Potts; James Lashly - Kopf

Episode chronology
← Previous "Family"	Next → "Suddenly Human"
- Star Trek: The Next Generation season 4

"Brothers" is the 77th episode of the syndicated American science fiction television series Star Trek: The Next Generation, the third episode of the fourth season.

Set in the 24th century, the series follows the adventures of the Starfleet crew of the Federation starship Enterprise-D. In this episode, Commander Data (Brent Spiner) aborts an emergency mission and hijacks the Enterprise in response to a homing command from his "father".

== Plot ==
A misguided prank between two young brothers exposes the younger of them to a toxic parasite that cannot be treated aboard the USS Enterprise, but Dr. Crusher (Gates McFadden) is able to stabilize his condition in a controlled environment in sickbay while the ship sets out for a starbase that can cure the boy. As Commander Data (Brent Spiner) escorts the older brother to visit his sibling, he suddenly stops and returns to the bridge where, unseen by the crew, he sets a new course for the ship and triggers a life support alarm, causing the evacuation of the bridge to be ordered. Captain Picard (Patrick Stewart) orders Geordi La Forge (LeVar Burton) to transfer the controls to Engineering while the rest of the bridge crew evacuates, but Data instead remains on the Bridge, mimics Picard's voice and locks down control of the ship with a complex access code, preventing any interference with his actions. The crew discover Data's lockdown and manually disable the transporter's site-to-site function to prevent Data from easily moving about the ship. Once the Enterprise is in orbit about the planet Terlina III, Data creates a programmed sequence of force fields to allow him to move from the bridge to the nearest transporter room without being stopped by security, and then beams down to the planet, leaving the Enterprise still under his lockdown. Picard orders his crew to attempt to override Data's lockdown of the ship, while Dr. Crusher attempts to keep the infected boy stabilized.

Data finds himself in the home of his creator, Dr. Noonien Soong (Brent Spiner). Soong states that he called Data to him using a form of automatic recall and makes a manual adjustment on Data to return him to normal. As they talk, they are joined by Lore (Brent Spiner), inadvertently also drawn by the same recall that Data received, since Soong assumed that Lore was still disassembled. Lore expresses resentment towards his creator and starts to leave, but stops when Soong tells both of his creations that he is dying and wishes to give Data an "emotion chip" he has created. Soong decides to rest before implanting the chip, leaving Data and Lore to talk. When he returns, he proceeds to implant the chip but discovers too late that Lore had managed to deactivate Data and switch clothing with him, so that he now possesses the emotion chip. Soong tries to warn Lore the chip is not designed for him, but Lore instead injures Soong and transports off the planet.

The crew of the Enterprise find a way to beam down an away team to the planet, where they discover the dying Soong and the deactivated Data. After Data is reactivated, he cannot recall any of what he did on the Enterprise to arrive at this planet, until Soong reveals to him where he can find that information stored in his memory files. Data apologizes to Soong that he will not be able to grieve for his loss, but Soong tells him he will grieve in his own way. After Soong states that he wishes to die on the planet, the Enterprise leaves and returns to its course to the medical facility, where the sick boy is successfully treated. Data observes the brothers at play after forgiving each other for the accident, which causes him to contemplate his own brotherhood with Lore.

== Production ==
Rick Berman's initial story did not involve Lore. The character was added at Michael Piller's suggestion, who believed the story needed an additional jeopardy element. Piller recalled:

We were standing around going through Rick's story and my feeling was that after reading his first draft that the idea of Data going back to see Dr. Soong and the story of the child who was hurt in the practical joke were not enough elements to hold up the episode. Once Data goes back to see Dr. Soong, it's basically a chat and without some jeopardy or another event to go on I was afraid it was going to be flat. We talked about what we could do and, ultimately, the obvious thing was that we bring Lore back. ..I knew from the moment we came up with it that Brent Spiner in three roles was going to make for an unforgettable episode and I think it was.

== Reception ==
Empire ranked "Brothers" 19th in the 50 top episodes of all Star Trek in 2016.

In 2016, The Hollywood Reporter rated "Brothers" the 76th best television episode of all Star Trek franchise television shows. And they ranked "Brothers" as 21st of 25 of the top episodes of Star Trek: The Next Generation in 2016.

In 2020, GameSpot recommended this episode for background on the character of Data.

== Home video ==
On February 27, 1996 "Brothers" & "Family" were released on LaserDisc in the United States. "Brothers" was released in the United States on September 3, 2002, as part of the Star Trek: The Next Generation season four DVD box set.

== See also ==
- Abdul Abulbul Amir
- "Borderland" (Star Trek: Enterprise) (Brent Spiner plays Noonien Soong's ancestor Arik Soong in this episode, as well as in "Cold Station 12" and "The Augments")
