= Identity Crisis (Star Trek: The Next Generation) =

- Star Trek: The Next Generation episode
- Episode no.: Season 4 Episode 18
- Directed by: Winrich Kolbe
- Story by: Timothy De Haas
- Teleplay by: Brannon Braga
- Production code: 192
- Original air date: March 25, 1991

Guest appearances
- Patti Yasutake - Alyssa Ogawa; Maryann Plunkett - Susanna Leijten; Dennis Madalone - Hendrick; Mona Grudt - Graham; Amick Byram - Paul Hickman; Paul Tompkins - Anthony Brevelle

Episode chronology
← Previous "Night Terrors"	Next → "The Nth Degree"
- Star Trek: The Next Generation season 4

"Identity Crisis" is the 92nd episode of the American science fiction television series Star Trek: The Next Generation. The 18th episode of the fourth season. The episode first aired in broadcast syndication on March 25, 1991.

Set in the 24th century, the series follows the adventures of the Starfleet crew of the Federation starship Enterprise-D. In this episode, Lt. Commander Geordi La Forge and an old friend reunite and find that disturbing events have happened to members of an away team mission they were on.

== Plot ==
Geordi La Forge’s friend and former crewmate, Lieutenant Commander Susanna Leijten, has come aboard the Enterprise-D. She is concerned because of a previous mission, in which she, Geordi, and three crewmates from the USS Victory were part of an away mission to the planet Tarchannen III; their crewmates have all deserted their posts, stolen shuttlecraft and attempted to return, leaving Leijten and La Forge as the only ones unaffected. Picard orders the ship to Tarchannen III; there, they find one of the stolen craft, operated by Lt. Hickman, attempting to land. The Enterprise is unable to establish communication with Hickman, and the craft is incinerated during atmospheric entry.

On the surface, Leijten and La Forge discover another shuttlecraft, empty; strange footprints are seen near it. Leijten starts feeling ill, and they return to the Enterprise. Leijten improves immediately, but Dr. Crusher finds evidence of alien skin in Leijten's body, not indigenous to the planet. While reviewing the data on the original Victory away team, Leijten becomes jittery, insists they return to the planet, and starts exhibiting bright blue veins across her body, three of her fingers fusing together on either hand and her nails becoming claws. In Sick Bay, Dr. Crusher restrains Leijten, determines she is mutating into another species, and worried that this fate will also befall La Forge. La Forge continues to study the data and discovers an anomaly in the original mission recording.

He notices a shadow that does not appear to belong to anyone on the mission. Starting to feel the same effects as Leijten, La Forge has the computer utilise the mission data to recreate the scene in the holodeck. By eliminating members of the mission from the scene he manages to discover that their team was in the presence of an invisible alien humanoid creature that created the shadow. It resembles what Leijten was mutating into. He suddenly goes into convulsions and soon mutates into an alien creature himself. Due to his newfound invisibility, Geordi easily evades the Enterprise sensors and transports to the surface.

Dr. Crusher discovers that Leijten's metamorphosis was triggered by an alien parasite that was capable of overwriting its host's DNA; removing the parasite quickly returns Leijten to normal. Leijten tells Dr. Crusher that placing the parasite in the host is the aliens' method of reproduction. Leijten joins the away team on the surface searching for La Forge, because (having previously suffered the metamorphosis) she will be able to track him. Using ultraviolet light, they discover a number of the creatures, all mutated members of the colony and the former Victory crewmembers. Leijten recognizes one as La Forge, and is able to coax him away and take him back to the ship where he is similarly cured. However, the other crewmen have been mutated far too long to be saved, and they are left behind on the planet; Picard orders warning beacons placed in orbit to protect the creatures (and prevent more victims from being mutated).

== Reception ==
In 2012, this episode was noted by Forbes as an alternative top ten Star Trek: The Next Generation episode selection. They described it as "suspenseful and creepy".

In 2012, Wired said this was one of the best episodes of Star Trek: The Next Generation.

In 2020, ScreenRant ranked this the 6th most frightening episode of Star Trek: The Next Generation, calling it a "terrifying episode"

== Home video ==
This episode was released in the United States on September 3, 2002, as part of the Star Trek: The Next Generation season four DVD box set.

== See also ==
- "Favorite Son" (Star Trek: Voyager)
