= Legacy (Star Trek: The Next Generation) =

- Star Trek: The Next Generation episode
- Episode no.: Season 4 Episode 6
- Directed by: Robert Scheerer
- Written by: Joe Menosky
- Cinematography by: Marvin Rush
- Production code: 180
- Original air date: October 29, 1990

Guest appearances
- Beth Toussaint - Ishara Yar; Don Mirault - Hayne; Colm Meaney - Miles O'Brien; Vladimir Velasco - Tan Tsu; Christopher Michael - Coalition Lieutenant

Episode chronology
← Previous "Remember Me"	Next → "Reunion"
- Star Trek: The Next Generation season 4

"Legacy" is the 80th episode of the syndicated American science fiction television series Star Trek: The Next Generation, the sixth episode of the fourth season. It marked the point at which the series surpassed the number of episodes in the original series.

Set in the 24th century, the series follows the adventures of the Starfleet crew of the Federation starship Enterprise-D. In this episode, the Enterprise crew is caught in the midst of a civil war on Turkana IV, former crew member Tasha Yar's homeworld. While negotiating with one of the factions, they discover that the faction's representative is Tasha's younger sister, Ishara Yar.

== Plot ==
The Enterprise, under the command of Captain Jean-Luc Picard (Patrick Stewart), responds to a distress call from the freighter Arcos. The Enterprise arrives just as the Arcos explodes; its escape pod lands on the planet Turkana IV, the birthplace of the Enterprise's late chief of security, Tasha Yar. Since Turkana IV is a lawless planet ruled by warring factions, the freighter crew's lives are in danger, and Picard decides to attempt a rescue.

Commander Riker (Jonathan Frakes) leads an away team to the surface, where they end up in a standoff with one of the two remaining factions, the Coalition. Their leader, Hayne (Don Mirault), explains that the other faction, the Alliance, holds the Arcos survivors hostage. He offers the Enterprise the Coalition's support, with Tasha's sister Ishara Yar (Beth Toussaint) as liaison. Ishara gradually gains the Enterprise crew's trust, befriending Commander Data (Brent Spiner), who was especially close to Tasha. Ishara seems ready to leave behind her life in the colony.

To find the hostages, Chief Engineer Geordi La Forge (LeVar Burton) suggests using the crashed escape pod's instruments; Ishara recommends that she beam separately to a nearby location as a distraction, because her implanted proximity sensor will set off the Alliance's alarms. The crew executes the plan, but Ishara is wounded in the attempt. Riker rescues her, and is impressed by her bravery.

When the Enterprise receives a message that the Alliance intends to kill the Arcos crew, Picard agrees to execute Ishara's proposed rescue plan: Dr. Crusher (Gates McFadden) removes Ishara's proximity device, which she gives to Data as a memento. Riker leads an away team to the planet, where they rescue the hostages, but Ishara disappears in the confusion. Data finds her trying to disable the Alliance security grid to allow a nearby Coalition force to attack. Data concludes that her interaction with the crew was a ploy. Riker arrives, distracting Ishara as she fires at Data, who dodges and then stuns her and reverses her attempted sabotage. Riker notes that her phaser was set to kill.

With the away team back aboard the Enterprise, Hayne demands that Picard return Ishara. While Riker argues that they have cause to hold her for firing on two Starfleet officers, Picard decides to allow her to leave. As Data escorts her to the transporter room, Ishara claims he was the closest thing she had to a friend. Later, Data is puzzled to realize that, although she betrayed his trust, he misses her.

== Releases ==
"Legacy" was released in the United States on September 3, 2002, as part of the Star Trek: The Next Generation season four DVD box set.
