= Devil's Due (Star Trek: The Next Generation) =

- Star Trek: The Next Generation episode
- Episode no.: Season 4 Episode 13
- Directed by: Tom Benko
- Story by: Philip Lazebnik; William Douglas Lansford
- Teleplay by: Philip Lazebnik
- Cinematography by: Marvin Rush
- Production code: 187
- Original air date: February 4, 1991

Guest appearances
- Marta DuBois - Ardra; Paul Lambert - Howard Clarke; Marcelo Tubert - Acost Jared; Thad Lamey - Devil Monster; Tom Magee - Fek'lhr

Episode chronology
← Previous "The Wounded"	Next → "Clues"
- Star Trek: The Next Generation season 4

"Devil's Due" is the 13th episode of the fourth season of the American science fiction television series Star Trek: The Next Generation, originally aired on February 4, 1991, in broadcast syndication in the United States. Based on an episode written by William Douglas Lansford for the planned Star Trek: Phase II (1978) television series, it was adapted for The Next Generation by Philip Lazebnik and directed by Tom Benko.

Set in the 24th century, the series follows the adventures of the Starfleet crew of the Federation starship Enterprise-D. In "Devil's Due", the crew of the Enterprise confront an individual claiming to be Ardra (Marta DuBois), a mythological entity from the planet Ventax II. She claims that the planet, and the orbiting Enterprise, are her legal property due to an agreement signed a thousand years earlier. Together, Captain Jean-Luc Picard (Patrick Stewart) and the crew reveal Ardra to be a con artist, leading to her arrest by the Ventaxian authorities.

Numerous changes were made from the original Phase II script, with only the general theme of the episode remaining. Originally pitched for use during season three, following changes made, it was added to season four. Critical reception of the episode has been mixed, with it generally being thought to be very reminiscent of Star Trek: The Original Series.

== Plot ==
The USS Enterprise receives a distress call from Dr. Howard Clarke (Paul Lambert), the leader of a Federation scientific delegation on Ventax II, where the population is in a state of panic, because they are convinced that their world will soon end. After the Enterprise arrives, they rescue Dr. Clarke who brings them up to date: A thousand years ago, according to Ventaxian history, the population entered a Faustian deal with Ardra, their mythology's devil. In exchange for ending wars and restoring the ecological balance, and improving their heavily polluted planet, the population would become the personal slaves of Ardra a thousand years later. As the millennium is about to come to a close, the planet has recently begun experiencing mild earthquakes, as well as seeing images of Ardra in the skies. These were said to be signs of her arrival.

As Captain Picard and Commander Data (Brent Spiner) discuss the matter with the Ventaxian leader, Accost Jared (Marcelo Tubert), a woman appears in the chamber, announcing herself as Ardra. She demonstrates her identity by starting an earthquake at will, and transforming into the Klingon devil Fek'lhr of Gre'Thor. Ardra states that she has come to claim the planet. Picard is instantly suspicious and orders Data to examine the contract that supposedly was signed by Ardra and the leaders of the planet a thousand years earlier. Picard returns to the Enterprise afterwards, and Ardra appears on the bridge, sitting in the Captain's chair. Security Chief Worf (Michael Dorn) is unable to remove her. Data returns just then and confirms the language of the contract as well as Ardra's claim to the planet and anything in its orbit, including the Enterprise.

Later, in a meeting with the senior staff, after speculating if she is Q in disguise or another member of the Q Continuum, Picard expresses his belief that she is a con artist and points out that all of her alleged powers can be recreated with theatrically delivered technology. After the meeting, Picard goes to bed for the evening. As Picard sleeps, Ardra appears and tries to seduce him, but he rejects her. She transports him to the planet dressed in his pajamas. Data comes to collect Picard by shuttle after Worf is unable to transport him back the normal way. When Picard and Data attempt to return to the Enterprise, the ship disappears. Not knowing what to do, they return to the planet.

Citing old legal precedent, Picard calls for a Ventaxian arbitration hearing, to which Ardra agrees, provided Data acts as the arbitrator, as he will act with impartiality. Picard explains to Jared that his people had actually improved their planet by themselves, through their own gradual hard work, ingenuity, and dedication. However, continued demonstrations of powers further the claim that Ardra is indeed who she says she is. During the course of the hearing, Chief Engineer La Forge (LeVar Burton) and Clarke discover that Ardra has a cloaked ship nearby, that she is indeed using technology to simulate magic, and that she is a known criminal. Picard sends an away team, led by Commander Riker (Jonathan Frakes), to take control of Ardra's ship, giving Picard control of her powers. He demonstrates technology-based fraud and she is taken into custody by local authorities. As Ardra has voluntarily withdrawn her suit, Data proclaims that the 1,000-year-old contract is null and void. Now convinced that Ardra is not Ardra from his culture's mythology, Jared thanks Picard for saving him and his people from their doom. Picard however, states that Jared and the Ventaxians have saved themselves a long time ago.

== Production ==
The episode was originally developed from a premise for the cancelled Star Trek: Phase II, although it underwent significant changes. It first appeared in a memo dated August 16, 1977, as part of a status update for the cancelled series. The only other episode of Phase II to be redeveloped for The Next Generation was "The Child" from season two.

In the original version, the Enterprise visits Naterra and meets the planet's leader, Zxolar, who is concerned that Captain Kirk is an alien called Komether, who is due to return within twenty days to destroy their world. Zxolar suddenly collapses and Doctor McCoy tries to help him, but an energy field surrounds the doctor's head and he runs into a wall and disappears. The landing party searches for McCoy, to no avail, and Zxolar is beamed to the Enterprise. Doctor Chapel attempts to help him, but the energy field appears around her and she passes out. Xon and Kirk discuss the energy and realize it wants Zxolar to die, as it has attacked anyone who helps him. The pair beam back down the planet to investigate the palace in which they met Zxolar and discover an archive that shows them the original agreement made by six philosophers, including a much younger Zxolar, and Komether a thousand years earlier. They note one of the philosophers is Zxolar and Komether is the energy being that attacked the two doctors. As in the later version used on Star Trek: The Next Generation, the agreement was that the being would correct the pollution of the planet in return for ownership of the planet a thousand years later. Xon and Kirk decide to move Zxolar to a life support table and ask for other volunteers, as it is apparent that Komether will attack them as they attempt to save Zxolar. Scotty, Sulu and Chekov all volunteer as well, and the alien disables each of them as they move Zxolar. It is only because of Xon's strength as he is being attacked that they manage to attach Zxolar to a life support machine and his life signs immediately improve. Zxolar tells Kirk about the contract, who retrieves it from the planet's surface and challenges it. Komether appears and agrees to a trial with the Enterprise's computer acting as an impartial judge. Kirk realizes that Komether was created by the six philosophers, and as the last remaining, Zxolar is in control of it. Zxolar manages to defeat the creature using his will and releases the stunned crewmen. He finds that McCoy was trapped within the wall and releases him, too. The Enterprise departs shortly thereafter.

The story was once again brought up during a story pitch for the season three of The Next Generation, and it was modified by several staff writers. Michael Piller made several changes, including making the devil character female. Marta DuBois was cast as Ardra, after Stella Stevens and Adrienne Barbeau were also considered. Paul Lambert had previously appeared in the episode "When the Bough Breaks" as a member of the Aldean race.

== Release ==
The episode was originally aired on February 4, 1991, in broadcast syndication in the United States. It was first released on VHS cassette on May 21, 1996. The episode was later included on the Star Trek: The Next Generation season four DVD box set, released in the United States on September 3, 2002. The first Blu-ray release was in the United Kingdom on July 29, 2013, followed by the United States on July 30.

On May 25, 1996, episodes "Devils Due" and "Clues" were released on LaserDisc in the United States. Published by Paramount Home Video, the single 12" double sided disc retailed for 34.95 USD. The disc video was NTSC format with a Dolby Surround audio track.

CBS announced on September 28, 2011, in celebration of the series' twenty-fifth anniversary, that Star Trek: The Next Generation would be completely re-mastered in 1080p high definition from the original 35mm film negatives. For the remaster almost 25,000 reels of original film stock were rescanned and reedited, and all visual effects were digitally recomposed from original large-format negatives and newly created CGI shots. The release was accompanied by 7.1 DTS Master Audio. On July 30, 2013 "Devil's Due" was released on 1080p high definition as part of the Season 4 Blu-ray box set in the United States. The set was released on July 29, 2013, in the United Kingdom.

== Reception ==
Several reviewers re-watched Star Trek: The Next Generation after the end of the series. Keith DeCandido watched the episode for Tor.com, and thought that Marta DuBois' performance was "the only reason why this episode is in any way watchable. Barely". He thought that the episode felt more similar to an original series story than a normal Next Generation story, and that was due to the episode's origins. He said "overall, it’s just dumb" and gave it a score of two out of ten. Zack Handlen thought more positively of the episode when he reviewed it for The A.V. Club. He did think that Captain Picard was pretending to be Captain Kirk for most of the episode and that it didn't have any real drama, but that it was "silly, goofy fun for the most part". He thought the episode was "cute" and gave it an overall score of B+. This episode illustrates Arthur C. Clarke's Third Law: "any sufficiently advanced technology is indistinguishable from magic."

Robert Blackman was nominated for a Primetime Emmy Award for Outstanding Costumes for a Series for his work in this episode. It was instead awarded to Bill Hargate for his work on the Murphy Brown episode "Eldin Imitates Life". Blackman would go on to win the award for the following two years for the episodes "Cost of Living" and "Time's Arrow, Part II".

== See also ==
- "Barge of the Dead" (Star Trek: Voyager) - further explores Klingon afterlife including Gre'thor
