= Eric Menyuk =

American attorney and former actor

- Born: November 5, 1959 (age 66); Brookline, Massachusetts, U.S.
- Education: Vassar College (1981); Loyola Law School (1998)
- Occupations: Actor (1987–98); Attorney (1998–present)
- Years active: 1987-2014, 2024
- Spouse(s): Laurie Menyuk; 2 children
- Website: navlaw.net/eric-menyuk/

Eric Menyuk (born November 5, 1959) is an American attorney and former actor. He is best known for his brief appearances in the television series Star Trek: The Next Generation as the Traveler. He was originally considered for the role of the android Data, which was eventually given to Brent Spiner. Upon retiring from acting, Menyuk retrained as an attorney, focusing on representing children with disabilities and advocating for children's education rights.

== Acting career ==
Menyuk was in the running to play the android character Data in Star Trek: The Next Generation. A memo from John Pike to John Ferrard dated April 13, 1987, listed Menyuk as one of several actors who were in contention for the role, also including Mark Lindsay Chapman, Kevin Peter Hall, and Kelvin Han Yee. Brent Spiner was eventually chosen for the role over Menyuk.

He was subsequently cast in the role of the Traveler, first appearing in the first season in the episode "Where No One Has Gone Before" and returning in the fourth-season episode "Remember Me" and season seven's "Journey's End". To portray the character, he had to undergo a three-hour make-up process on each day of shooting, including prosthetics applied to his face and to both hands to reduce the number of fingers shown. He later remarked that although he respected the work of Michael Westmore, he disliked the prosthetics on his hands and went out of his way during shooting to hide them. Following his appearances on Star Trek, he has appeared on the convention circuit, including Star Trek-themed cruises on Carnival Cruise Lines.

In 2024, he reprised the role of the Traveler in a voice cameo in "The Devourer of All Things, Part I" in Star Trek: Prodigy season 2.

== Personal life ==
He is an attorney, having graduated from Loyola Law School, Los Angeles, in 1998 after he retired from film and television. He and his wife Laurie have a son and a daughter.

Due to his son's special needs, he has moved into the field of law involving children's education rights. He was admitted to the State Bar of California on July 12, 1998. He earned his undergraduate degree from Vassar College in 1981.

== Select filmography ==
=== Movies ===
- Ghost Dad (1990) as Clinic Doctor
- Fearless (1993) as Sears Salesman
- The Air Up There (1994) as Mark Collins
- The Babysitter (1995) as Joe
- Thieves (2018) as Boss

=== TV guest appearances ===
- Hill Street Blues as Carney (1 episode, 1987)
- The Betty Ford Story (1987) (TV movie) as Jake
- L.A. Law as Roland Burnet (2 episodes, 1987–1989)
- Matlock as Al White (3 episodes, 1987–1994)
- Star Trek: The Next Generation as The Traveler (3 episodes, 1987–1994)
- Cheers as Larry the Mailman (1 episode, 1988)
- Falcon Crest as Dr. Peters (1 episode, 1989)
- thirtysomething as Man #4 (1 episode, 1990)
- Jake and the Fatman (2 episodes, 1990)
- Married... with Children as Black Bob (2 episodes, 1990–1993)
- Night Court as Pizza Guy (1 episode, 1991)
- Melrose Place as Physician (1 episode, 1993)
- University Hospital as Max Whistler (1 episode, 1995)
- Ellen as Jim Hogan (1 episode, 1996)
- Voice from the Grave (1996) (TV movie) as Nate Bradshaw
- Diagnosis: Murder as Peter (1 episode, 1996)
- L.A. Doctors as Dr. Daniel Dalsky (1 episode, 1998)
- Star Trek: Prodigy as The Traveler (1 episode, 2024)

== Sources ==
- Nemecek, Larry (2003). Star Trek: The Next Generation Companion (3rd ed.). New York: Pocket Books. ISBN 0-7434-5798-6.
