= Family (Star Trek: The Next Generation) =

- Star Trek: The Next Generation episode
- Episode no.: Season 4 Episode 2
- Directed by: Les Landau
- Written by: Ronald D. Moore
- Production code: 178
- Original air date: October 1, 1990

Guest appearances
- Jeremy Kemp – Robert Picard; Samantha Eggar – Marie Picard; Theodore Bikel – Sergey Rozhenko; Georgia Brown – Helena Rozhenko; Dennis Creaghan – Louis; Colm Meaney – Miles O'Brien; David Tristan Birkin – René Picard; Doug Wert – Jack Crusher; Ian Abercrombie – Voiceover; Whoopi Goldberg – Guinan

Episode chronology
← Previous "The Best of Both Worlds, Part II"	Next → "Brothers"
- Star Trek: The Next Generation season 4

"Family" is the second episode of the fourth season of the American science fiction television series Star Trek: The Next Generation, and the 76th episode overall. It was originally released on October 1, 1990, in broadcast syndication. It was written by Ronald D. Moore, from an idea by Michael Piller. It featured additional work taken from a spec script by Susanne Lambdin. "Family" was directed by Les Landau.

Set in the 24th century, the series follows the adventures of the Starfleet crew of the Federation starship Enterprise-D. In this episode, the Enterprise is docked at Earth following the events of "The Best of Both Worlds". Captain Jean-Luc Picard (Patrick Stewart) visits his brother's family in France, where he begins to come to terms with his treatment by the Borg. Wesley Crusher (Wil Wheaton) views a holographic recording made by his deceased father, Jack (Doug Wert). Meanwhile, Lt. Worf's (Michael Dorn) adoptive parents Sergey (Theodore Bikel) and Helena Rozhenko (Georgia Brown) come on board the Enterprise to comfort him following his discommendation.

Initially, executive producer Rick Berman wanted a science-based subplot included, but Piller convinced him otherwise. The premise was hated by series creator Gene Roddenberry, but Moore's script went into production nonetheless. "Family" had an extended guest cast, some of whom returned later in the series. The episode received a Nielsen rating of 9.6 percent, the lowest of the season. However, it has been referred to by critics as one of the best episodes of the series. The guest cast was praised, as was the Picard-centric plot with Stewart's performance in the scene where he confesses his feelings about the Borg held up as a highlight.

== Plot ==
The Enterprise-D is docked at Earth Station McKinley, undergoing repairs and refitting following its battle with the Borg. The episode follows the interactions of three members of the crew with their family members.

Lt. Worf's (Michael Dorn) adoptive human parents, Sergey (Theodore Bikel) and Helena Rozhenko (Georgia Brown) visit the Enterprise, having only just learned about his discommendation. Worf, wishing to bear his shame alone, at first is embarrassed by their presence and their “human” feelings of love and support but in the end appreciates their concern.

Doctor Beverly Crusher (Gates McFadden) retrieves a chest, kept in storage on Earth, containing her late husband Jack's mementos, including a holographic recording he made for Wesley (Wil Wheaton) when their child was only 10 weeks old. Beverly, though worried that the two of them have only recently truly come to terms with Jack's death, eventually gives the recording to Wesley. Wesley runs the recording and is uplifted by the message.

Captain Jean-Luc Picard (Patrick Stewart), recovering from his Borg assimilation, visits his family's vineyard in La Barre, France, which is run by his elder brother Robert (Jeremy Kemp) along with his wife Marie (Samantha Eggar) and son René (David Birkin). Jean-Luc is considering a position on Earth with an underwater research project called Atlantis that his friend Louis (Dennis Creaghan), a supervisor of the project, recommended to him. Robert has always been jealous of his brother's success and is concerned that Jean-Luc's presence will drive René to also join Starfleet. The two have a bitter argument that escalates into a physical fight and finally culminates in an emotional reunion, with Jean-Luc breaking down and admitting his feelings of powerlessness and guilt at the things he did under the control of the Borg. Robert states that Jean-Luc will have to learn to live with what he did, regardless of where he goes. Jean-Luc decides to go back to the Enterprise. The two spend the night getting drunk as they resolve their differences. After Jean-Luc leaves, Robert decides to let René follow his dream to join Starfleet as René sits under a tree and looks up at the stars.

== Production ==
=== Writing ===
The writing team initially looked to extend the Borg-based "The Best of Both Worlds" into a trilogy, but executive producer Rick Berman turned down the idea. So Michael Piller sought to have a plot in which Picard could address the effects of Borg assimilation. This caused some problems with the producers, as they were accustomed to bottle episodes and expected the status quo to be returned to at the end of each installment. But Piller managed to convince both Berman and Gene Roddenberry. However, Berman had a caveat: the episode had to have a science-based plot on board the Enterprise. The writers attempted to include this request in several versions, suggesting plots such as a child stowaway and a crewmember suffering from a nightmare in which they see other members of the crew disappearing. Berman relented on his request after several weeks, although the latter idea was later used in "Remember Me".

Ronald D. Moore wrote the script, and pitched it directly to Roddenberry in a meeting along with Piller and Berman. Roddenberry said that he hated the episode idea, as he felt that the animosity shown by the Picard brothers would not exist at that point in the future. He said it was not Star Trek as it had no action or jeopardy. After the meeting was over, Moore asked Piller and Berman what he should do and was advised to ignore Roddenberry's comments and write the script. He never heard what happened with Roddenberry, but the script went through without any issues. Picard's family was later mentioned once again in the 1994 film Star Trek Generations. The original idea was for Robert to die following a heart attack, but instead the writers opted to kill off both Robert and René off-screen in a fire. Throughout the years of The Next Generation, dozens of Jack Crusher related spec scripts had been received. The scenes in "Family" were taken from one submitted by Susanne Lambdin. Piller found the scenes powerful, as the episode was produced shortly after the birth of his daughter.

=== Filming and guest casting ===
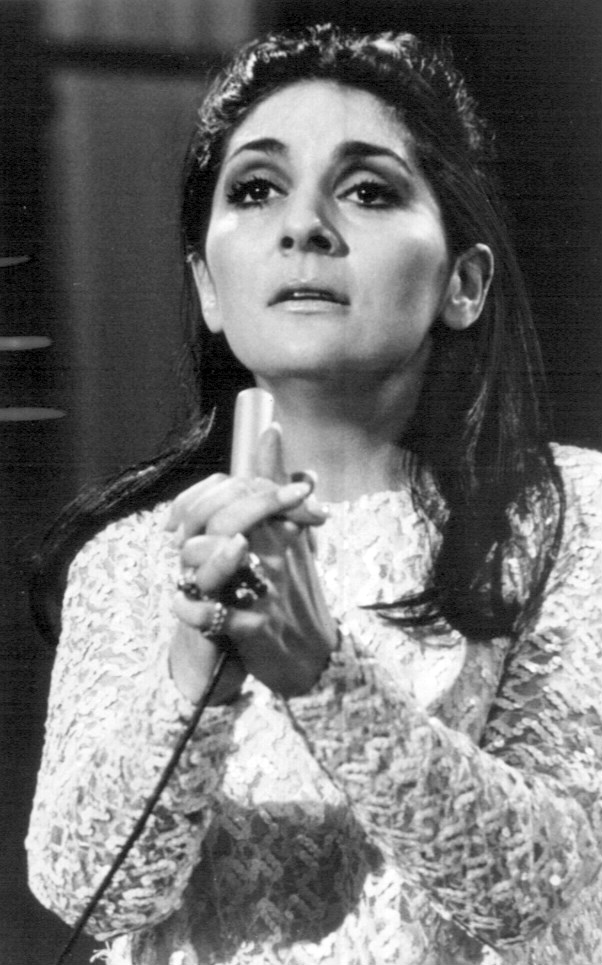
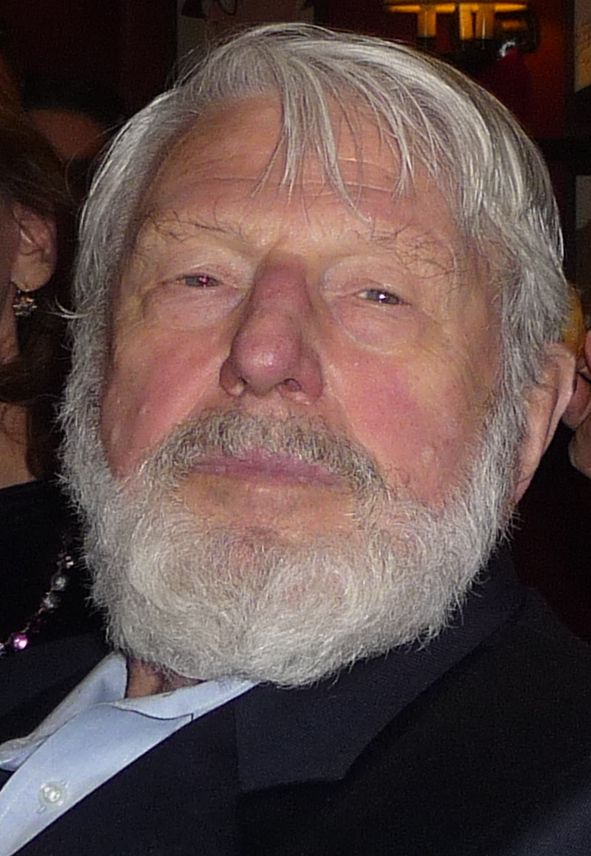
Georgia Brown and Theodore Bikel made their Star Trek debuts in "Family".

Although the episode was the second episode of the fourth season broadcast, it was the fourth episode produced. The scenes with the Picard family were shot on location at a private home in Encino, Los Angeles, and the vineyard was filmed at a dryland farming site in Lancaster, California, near Edwards Air Force Base. The two separate locations were merged on-screen digitally by visual effects supervisor Dan Curry using matte paintings. Most unusually, "Family" did not have any scenes set on the bridge of the Enterprise. Director Les Landau said it was the best episode of the series he'd directed, and one of the best episodes in general.

"Family" had a diverse guest cast, portraying the various family members of the crew. Bikel and Brown were both well known in Yiddish theatre circles, although there were concerns from the crew that they might seem comically Jewish on screen. But their fears were unfounded and the duo later returned in the fifth season episode "New Ground". Kemp and Eggar were known from a variety of television and stage performances. Birkin returned in the sixth season episode "Rascals" as Captain Jean-Luc Picard, when the character is changed into a pre-adolescent child by the transporter. The characters of Robert and René were later mentioned in the film Star Trek Generations, as they were killed off-screen in a fire. Doug Wert portrayed Jack Crusher, and later returned as the character in the fifth-season episode "Violations". The episode was also the only episode of The Next Generation in which Brent Spiner did not appear as Data.

== Reception ==
=== Broadcast and awards ===
"Family" aired in broadcast syndication during the week commencing October 1, 1990. It received Nielsen ratings of 9.6, reflecting the percentage of all households watching the episode during its timeslot. It was the least watched episode of the season, and one of only two episodes, alongside "In Theory", to receive a rating of less than 10 percent.

Marvin V. Rush's work in "Family" was nominated for Outstanding Cinematography for a Series at the 43rd Primetime Emmy Awards.

=== Critical reception ===
Mark Jones and Lance Parkin, in their book Beyond the Final Frontier : An Unauthorised Review of Star Trek, described "Family" as "wonderful small-scale stuff" and praised the performances of Stewart and Kemp. They criticised the Wesley and Worf storylines, but only because they took screen time away from the Picard story. James Van Hise and Hal Schuster in The Complete Trek: The Next Generation also criticized the Wesley and Worf stories for the same reason, but called "Family" one of the best The Next Generation episodes as it "bravely deals with human issues rather than galactic conflict." The duo suggested that it might have been considered for awards if the writers had concentrated solely on the Picard plot.

In 2010, Zack Handlen gave "Family" a rating of A for The A.V. Club. He said it was "one of the best hours TNG has ever done" and that the Picard scenes were the highlights. He called the scene where Picard confesses his feelings about the Borg to Robert his favourite of "all Stewart's amazing acting moments on the show so far". He summed up "Family", saying "It's also a remarkable episode, thoughtful, a little sad, but in the end full of hope. The final shot shows Picard's nephew dreaming under the stars. Like much of this episode, it could've been corny. And like all of this episode, it isn't." "Family" was included in a top ten list of the non-typical best episodes of the series by Carol Pinchefsky for Forbes; she called the scene where Picard admits his feelings towards the Borg the highlight of the episode.

Keith DeCandido reviewed the episode for Tor.com, rating it ten out of ten. He suggested the episode may have had "the most impressive collection of guest stars of any episode of Star Trek", lending further praise to Wert, Birkin and Dennis Creaghan as Louis. But he added that Kemp, Eggar, Bikel and Brown were "near perfect casting". He said that "Family" was "an absolute high point of TNG and one of the best episodes they ever did", as it made the characters appear as "people". He said that the writing "cemented [Ronald D. Moore's] place as one of the top writers of the franchise", and described the acting as "simply phenomenal".

“I tried so hard but I wasn’t strong enough. I wasn’t good enough.”

— Picard sobbing in "Family" as noted by Radio Times

In 2014, the episode was ranked as the 73rd best out of the 700 plus episodes in the Star Trek franchise by Charlie Jane Anders for io9. She described it as "revolutionary" due to it showing the outcome of a "big 'event' episode". James Hunt, in his review for Den of Geek in 2015, said that it was an "off-template" episode which was likely to cause a strong reaction from viewers. He said that he had enjoyed it, as it took time to address the trauma of the previous two episodes whereas episodes such as "Hard Time" in Star Trek: Deep Space Nine saw characters getting over such incidents in a matter of minutes of screen time. Because the plot of "Family" followed on from the events of "The Best of Both Worlds", Hunt considered it to be the third part in the arc. Aaron Couch, when writing about the Borg story arc for The Hollywood Reporter, described "Family" as "an understated but highly acclaimed episode".

In 2015, The Hollywood Reporter, noted this episode's scenes with Picard and his brother, as one of the top ten "most stunning" moments of Star Trek: The Next Generation. A year later, The Hollywood Reporter rated "Family" the 10th best television episode of all Star Trek franchise television shows prior to Star Trek: Discovery including live-action and animated series but not counting the movies. In 2016, U.K magazine Radio Times said that Picard's tearful breakdown as the 10th greatest scene in all Star Trek film and television. They commend the writers for taking a bold risk, by having the television lead actually cry which they felt made the character more credible. In the same year, IGN ranked "Family" the 11th best episode of all Star Trek series. In 2018, Tom's Guide rated "Family" one of the 15 best episodes featuring Captain Picard. In 2019, The Hollywood Reporter listed this among the twenty five best episodes of Star Trek: The Next Generation. The year after, SciFiPulse.net ranked this episode one of the top seven about the character Captain Picard.

In the run-up to Star Trek: Picard, IGN, Space.com, Games Radar, and Vulture all ranked "Family" as one of the episodes to watch before Star Trek: Picard. Games Radar noted that this Picard-character heavy episode was one that helped to "define the character."

== Home media release ==
"Family" was first released on VHS cassette in the United States and Canada on February 6, 1996. On February 27, 1996 "Brothers" & "Family" were released on LaserDisc in the United States.

The episode was later released in the United States on September 3, 2002, as part of the Star Trek: The Next Generation season four DVD box set. The first Blu-ray release was in the United Kingdom on July 29, 2013, followed by the United States on July 30.
