= The Nth Degree (Star Trek: The Next Generation) =

- Star Trek: The Next Generation episode
- Episode no.: Season 4 Episode 19
- Directed by: Robert Legato
- Written by: Joe Menosky
- Production code: 193
- Original air date: April 1, 1991

Guest appearances
- Dwight Schultz – Reginald Barclay; Saxon Trainor – Linda Larson; Page Leong – April Anaya; Jim Norton – Albert Einstein; David Coburn – Brower; Kay E. Kuter - Cytherian

Episode chronology
← Previous "Identity Crisis"	Next → "Qpid"
- Star Trek: The Next Generation season 4

"The Nth Degree" is the 93rd episode of the American science fiction television series Star Trek: The Next Generation, and the 19th episode of the fourth season. Set in the 24th century, the series follows the adventures of the Starfleet crew of the Federation starship Enterprise-D. Rob Legato directed and oversaw visual effects for the episode. He created a 3-D effect where the Cytherian's huge head appears to pop out of the screen, allowing him to have a face-to-face conversation with Picard.

== Plot ==
The teaser starts with Dr. Beverly Crusher and Lt. Reginald Barclay performing a scene from the 19th century play Cyrano de Bergerac. While Dr. Crusher performs well, Lt. Barclay struggles with his stuttering and anxiety, making mistakes and forgetting lines. As a minor character, this serves to re-introduce the viewer to Barclay and his typical extreme shyness and social awkwardness.

The Enterprise is sent to investigate the shutdown of the Argus Array, a deep-space telescope and radio antenna. Geordi La Forge and Lt. Barclay take a shuttlecraft to examine the array closely, discovering the presence of an alien probe nearby; the probe fires a pulse as they near it, disabling the shuttlecraft and knocking out Barclay. The Enterprise crew recovers the shuttle and are forced to destroy the probe when it follows the ship, believing the Argus Array was affected by a similar pulse. Barclay recovers, but the crew finds him much more intelligent than before. His IQ continues to increase, and La Forge finds that he has spent the night in a holodeck arguing quantum physics with Albert Einstein.

The Array starts to undergo a series of catastrophic failures. Barclay, with his newfound intelligence, casually explains how they can use the Enterprise computers to prevent the failures in only two days, much to his colleagues' disbelief. Barclay's solution works temporarily, but the failure rate increases, and Barclay finds the Enterprise computer too slow to keep up with it. He goes to the holodeck and creates a device that allows him to interact directly with the Enterprise and array computer systems, putting an end to the Array's failures. The crew finds that Barclay has become too integrated with the computer, and when they try to shut down the computer, Barclay sends the ship into a "subspace inversion", sending the ship across a great distance at a velocity significantly faster than conventional warp drive.

They arrive at the center of the Milky Way galaxy, and are met by a representative of a race of beings called the Cytherians, who are far more advanced than humans and find amusement in their "bipedal locomotion" and "hierarchical collective command structure". They free Barclay from the computer, and, minus his heightened intelligence, he arrives on the bridge to help explain what happened. The Cytherians are friendly explorers like the Federation, but instead of traveling to meet other races, they have launched probes that convey the necessary technical knowledge for other beings to come to them. The probe was unable to reprogram the Argus Array or the Enterprise shuttlecraft, causing them to fail. But it was able to reprogram Barclay, giving him the power to accomplish the task.

The Enterprise stays with the Cytherians for ten days, exchanging knowledge that will take decades to fully understand. The Cytherians then return the Enterprise to the Argus Array. Barclay finds himself back to normal, although he keeps vivid memories of his temporary transformation.

== Cultural references ==
The website Women at Warp compares the "sidekick-turned-supervillain" situation with the Buffy the Vampire Slayer episode "Grave". "While Barclay's run as a supergenius in 'The Nth Degree' is short lived and Willow's progression into a black magic wielding ultra-witch spans multiple episodes, their arcs are strikingly similar. Both Barclay and Willow (particularly in the first 4 seasons) are depicted as meek and shy, cast in their own minds as the 'sidekick' to their more powerful peers. When each is suddenly imbued with a terrifying amount of power, their friends fear how far they will go. Ultimately both must cope with returning to their former, less powerful states, but with the knowledge of the terror they inflicted on the people they cared about."

When confronted on the holodeck and ordered by Captain Picard to disconnect from the ship's computer, Barclay responds via disembodied voice, "I'm afraid I can't do that, sir". This is a reference to a line spoken by HAL 9000 in 2001: A Space Odyssey.

== Reception ==
James Hunt, reviewing for the site Den of Geek, jovially recaps the plot ("...they meet a giant floating head alien who speaks like he was bussed in from Hercules: The Legendary Journeys. Apparently the race in this star system are so lazy that they like to explore by bringing ships to them, so Barclay did exactly what they want. The Enterprise crew stick around to share information, and try not to think about the array they failed to repair."), remarks on trivia and passes judgment on the episode:

Perhaps my favourite thing is that it didn't just go full Flowers for Algernon, which would've been the easy way out of the plot. Nope, the Enterprise crew completely loses control of the situation and basically they would've died if the circumstances had been less benevolent. In narrative terms it's probably not particularly satisfying for the lead characters to be passive observers to the story's climax, but as a sci-fi nerd I enjoyed the exploration of an idea through to its natural conclusion.

Keith DeCandido, in his review for Tor.com, gave the episode an 8 out of 10, writing, "It's an excellent episode that works on pretty much every level. It's a good sequel to Hollow Pursuits, as it gives Barclay what he always wanted—confidence, creativity, intelligence—but yanks it away from him at the end. It provides a wonderfully alien species in the Cytherians, who are in the fine Star Trek tradition of aliens who seem menacing but turn out to be more complicated than that. It makes very good use of Cyrano de Bergerac, one of the greatest plays in the history of human theatre... Ultimately, what sells it is Dwight Schultz, who gives a superb performance..."

Jamahl Epsicokhan, also citing Daniel Keyes's classic science fiction novel in a review of 4 out of 4 stars, writes, "The character outline is Flowers for Algernon, except instead of taking a mentally challenged man and turning him into a genius, it takes a man of average intelligence (for this crew) and turns him into an ultra-confident, cosmic super-genius. In the opening scene, regular-Barclay is playing Cyrano de Bergerac in a performance that, let's face it, is pathetic despite his best efforts. Later, watch how genius-Barclay's acting is so mesmerizing that it practically makes Crusher weep." He goes on,

The way the crew reacts to all this is absolutely honest human nature; they fear what they cannot predict or understand... especially when Barclay puts an energy field off the starboard side of the ship and prepares to send the crew 30,000 light-years through it... The suspense of what waits at the other side is one of the true moments of unpredictable awe in the Trek canon. What actually waits there, alas, cannot live up to that awe, but I did still enjoy the episode's sense of whimsical curiosity, in which it turns out that advanced aliens used Barclay as an implement to bring the Enterprise here in carrying out their own exploration of the galaxy. Barclay is of course returned to normal... "The Nth Degree" is a splendidly unique amalgam of tones and themes, plot and characterization, imagination and bemusement, and it ends up being one of the most fascinating hours in TNG's run.

In 2020, Screen Rant ranked the Cytherians the 8th smartest aliens of the Star Trek franchise, highlighting their knowledge of subspace distortions.

== Home video ==
This episode was released in the United States on September 3, 2002, as part of the Star Trek: The Next Generation season four DVD box set.

CBS announced on September 28, 2011, in celebration of the series' twenty-fifth anniversary, that Star Trek: The Next Generation would be completely re-mastered in 1080p high definition from the original 35mm film negatives. For the remaster almost 25,000 reels of original film stock were rescanned and reedited, and all visual effects were digitally recomposed from original large-format negatives and newly created CGI shots. The release was accompanied by 7.1 DTS Master Audio. On July 30, 2013 "The Nth Degree" was released on 1080p high definition as part of the Season 4 Blu-ray box set in the United States. The set was released on July 29, 2013, in the United Kingdom.
