= Night Terrors (Star Trek: The Next Generation) =

- Star Trek: The Next Generation episode
- Episode no.: Season 4 Episode 17
- Directed by: Les Landau
- Story by: Shari Goodhartz
- Teleplay by: Pamela Douglas; Jeri Taylor
- Production code: 191
- Original air date: March 18, 1991

Guest appearances
- Rosalind Chao - Keiko O'Brien; John Vickery - Andrus Hagan; Duke Moosekian - Gillespie; Craig Hurley - Peeples; Brian Tochi - Peter Lin; Lanei Chapman - Sariel Rager; Colm Meaney - Miles O'Brien; Whoopi Goldberg - Guinan; Deborah Taylor - Chantal Zaheva

Episode chronology
← Previous "Galaxy's Child"	Next → "Identity Crisis"
- Star Trek: The Next Generation season 4

"Night Terrors" is the 91st episode of the American science fiction television series Star Trek: The Next Generation; the 17th episode of the fourth season.

Set in the 24th century, the series follows the adventures of the Starfleet crew of the Federation starship Enterprise-D. In this episode, the Enterprise investigates a derelict starship while Deanna Troi has strange dreams, and the crew begins to behave erratically.

This episode was aired on television on March 18, 1991. The episode guest stars John Vickery as Hagan.

== Plot ==
The Enterprise is searching a binary star system in an effort to find the USS Brittain, a Federation science vessel which went missing a month earlier. The crew locates the ship but the Brittain is derelict, and all the crew are dead save one: the ship's Betazoid science adviser, Andrus Hagan, who is discovered hiding in a room just off the bridge. Hagan has somehow survived, but he has been shaken by the experience and is in a profound catatonic state. Counselor Deanna Troi tries to use her telepathy to contact Hagan. Meanwhile, Geordi La Forge and Data set to work repairing the Brittain but discover that although everything is in working order, the ship still fails to move. Dr. Beverly Crusher determines that all of the Brittain's crew died at each other's hands. That night onward, Troi has trouble sleeping, encountering the same dream in which she levitates and drifts in the direction of a mysterious voice repeating, "Eyes in the dark, one moon circles".

Four days later, with the investigation stalled, Captain Picard decides that the time has come to move on, but the crew find the ship also stalled like the Brittain. Data discovers that both ships are trapped in a spatial phenomenon known as a "Tyken's Rift", and they can only escape through the force of a tremendous explosion. However, as they work at determining how to create this explosion, the crew starts becoming irritable and experiences hallucinations. Dr. Crusher realizes that everyone but Troi has failed to achieve REM sleep since entering the rift, leading to their current state. As violence begins to erupt around the ship, Picard assigns Data, who does not sleep or dream and is therefore unaffected, as acting Captain.

Data eventually attempts to use a pulse from the deflector aimed at the center of the rift to create the explosion, but this fails to produce any effect. Meanwhile, as Troi listens to Hagen, she hears him mention "eyes in the dark" and realizes that he has been having the same dream she has. This leads her to realize that it is not a dream, but a message. As Data looks for other solutions with Troi, they realize that "eyes in the dark" may refer to the nearby binary star system, and "one moon circling" may be a description of a hydrogen atom. Data and Troi work out that there must be another ship from a psychic race trapped on the other side of the rift who is aware of their presence but looking for hydrogen to create an explosion. Troi goes to sleep to contact the other species through the dream, while Data vents hydrogen into the rift. An explosion soon occurs, and both the Enterprise and the alien ship are freed. As the crew recovers, Data returns the ship to Picard, but not before ordering everyone to get some sleep.

== Production ==
The episode's story was devised by Shari Goodhartz, with the script by Pamela Douglas and Jeri Taylor.

The episode made use of hydrogen as a plot device.

The episode was intended as a vehicle for Marina Sirtis, but she disliked it due to her fear of heights and the requirement that she be strapped into a flying harness.

The model used for the USS Brattain is the same as was used for the USS Reliant in Star Trek II: The Wrath of Khan. The ship is occasionally referred to as the USS Brittain due to a spelling error on the exterior of the model.

== Reception ==
Zack Handlen of The A.V. Club noted that the episode "...lacked that mild twist at the end to make it memorable" but also that "This kind of episode is really the meat-and-potatoes of this sort of show, so it's impressive to realize that TNG has gotten to the point where delivering the expected is no longer entirely satisfactory". According to James Hunt of Den of Geek "It’s not completely incompetent, but it’s hard to imagine anyone loving this episode".

TechRepublic placed the episode in its list of "The five worst Star Trek: The Next Generation episodes ever".

Jonathan Frakes referred to the episode as "a yawner".

H&I noted this episode as one featuring scary Star Trek content. TheGamer ranked this one of the top 25 creepiest episodes of all Star Trek series. They note a number of scenes with frightening imagery, depicted in hallucinations or dreams. Den of Geek ranked this episode the 22nd most scary episode of all Star Trek series up to that time. They also felt the episode was "weird" and were critical of the Troi dream sequences and outfits, particularly her sleep attire, "..a sleeveless halter neck with a choker-style collar? Did she just get back from clubbing..?" ScreenRant ranked this the most frightening episode of Star Trek: The Next Generation, elaborating, "it's unsettling to say the least" as the crew, unable to REM sleep, contend with paranoia, exhaustion, and fear. They also ranked it as the 4th scariest episode of all Star Trek franchise episodes. In particular they praised the creepiness of Dr. Crusher's hallucination on the Enterprise, when a morgue full of corpses come alive in unison, giving a macabre surprise.

== Home video ==
This episode was released in the United States on September 3, 2002, as part of the Star Trek: The Next Generation season four DVD box set.

== DVD ==
- Star Trek The Next Generation DVD set, volume 4, disk 5, selection 1.
