= The Drumhead =

- Star Trek: The Next Generation episode
- Episode no.: Season 4 Episode 21
- Directed by: Jonathan Frakes
- Written by: Jeri Taylor
- Cinematography by: Marvin Rush
- Production code: 195
- Original air date: April 29, 1991

Guest appearances
- Jean Simmons - Norah Satie; Bruce French – Sabin Genestra; Spencer Garrett – Simon Tarses; Henry Woronicz – J'Dan; Earl Billings – Thomas Henry; Ann Shea – Nellen Tore

Episode chronology
← Previous "Qpid"	Next → "Half a Life"
- Star Trek: The Next Generation season 4

"The Drumhead" is the 95th episode of the syndicated American science fiction television series Star Trek: The Next Generation and the 21st episode of the program's fourth season. The episode was directed by cast member Jonathan Frakes. It takes the form of a courtroom drama, and is named for a drumhead court-martial, which is one that takes place on the field of battle.

Set in the 24th century, the series follows the adventures of the Starfleet crew of the Federation starship Enterprise-D. In this episode, an explosion aboard the Enterprise leads to a high-level investigation headed by Admiral Norah Satie (Jean Simmons), a retired officer renowned for her skill at exposing conspiracies.

== Plot ==
When an explosion within the dilithium chamber of the Federation starship Enterprise's main engineering appears to be the work of sabotage, Starfleet Command dispatches Norah Satie (Jean Simmons), a retired rear admiral from the legal division of its support services section, to lead an investigation to uncover the cause.

Worf (Michael Dorn) discovers that J'Dan (Henry Woronicz), a Klingon exchange officer, had been using modified hypospray syringes to encode information into amino acid sequences for secret transport. J'Dan admits his collaboration with the Romulans but attests that he did not sabotage the chamber. Satie and Captain Jean-Luc Picard (Patrick Stewart) interview crew members who associated with J'Dan, including Dr. Beverly Crusher and medical technician Simon Tarses (Spencer Garrett). Satie's aide Sabin (Bruce French) suspects Tarses of lying when questioned, and Satie orders surveillance on Tarses despite Picard's objection that there is no evidence against him.

Meanwhile, Chief Engineer Geordi La Forge (LeVar Burton) and Lieutenant Commander Data (Brent Spiner) determine that the explosion was caused by simple metal fatigue, not sabotage. Picard considers the matter closed, but Satie intensifies her investigation of Tarses, forcing him to reveal that his grandfather was a Romulan. When Picard attempts to put a stop to the investigation, Satie begins investigating Picard himself, with Admiral Thomas Henry (Earl Billings) from Starfleet Security in attendance.

Satie attempts to cast doubt on Picard's loyalty by citing a number of recent incidents, including Picard's assimilation by the Borg. Picard responds with a quote from Satie's own father, respected jurist Aaron Satie: "With the first link, the chain is forged. The first speech censured, the first thought forbidden, the first freedom denied, chains us all irrevocably." Satie is enraged at him invoking her father and condemns Picard as a traitor. Admiral Henry becomes disgusted with Satie's fanaticism and calls a halt to any additional investigation. After they leave the ship, Picard discusses the incident with Worf, noting that humanity has not advanced as much beyond historical injustices as they would like to believe, and humanity must remain vigilant against fanatics such as Satie to protect their freedom.

== Reception ==
Zack Handlen of The A.V. Club gave the episode a grade A. Keith DeCandido of Tor.com rated it three out of ten.

"The Drumhead" was rated the 15th best episode of Star Trek: The Next Generation in 2016 by The Hollywood Reporter. Actor Michael Dorn, who played the character Worf on the show, has stated this was his favorite episode of the series, and in particular liked Worf and Picard's scene at the end of the episode.

In 2014, "The Drumhead" was rated as the 34th best episode of Star Trek by io9, when reviewing the top 100 episodes of all series up to that time (including animated and live-action television series). In 2018, Tom's Guide rated "The Drumhead" one of the 15 best episodes featuring Picard. In 2017, Den of Geek ranked Jean Simmons' role as one of the top ten guest stars on Star Trek: The Next Generation.

In 2017, Vulture.com listed this episode as one of the best of Star Trek: The Next Generation.

In 2018, Entertainment Weekly ranked "The Drumhead" as one of the top ten moments of Jean-Luc Picard. In 2018, Popular Mechanics highlighted "The Drumhead" as one of the best Picard episodes, and as recommended viewing for audiences to prepare for a new television series based on that character, Star Trek: Picard.

In 2019, The Hollywood Reporter ranked it among the top 25 episodes of Star Trek: The Next Generation, noting the acting performance by guest star Jean Simmons and its narrative warning about those who spread fear, of fanatical biases and McCarthyism.

In 2020, Games Radar recommended watching this episode prior to viewing Star Trek: Picard.

In 2020, Space.com considered Picard's speech (beginning "With the first link, the chain is forged. The first speech censored. The first thought forbidden. The first freedom denied—chains us all irrevocably") as one of the character's top ten moments.

In 2020, ScreenRant ranked "The Drumhead" as the most important TNG episode with a morality message, noting that "in an age of social media and out of control fake news, Admiral Satie's rhetoric has been taken to insane extremes within our culture, forcing us to once again examine our propensity for falling victim to conspiracy theories and nefarious agendas perpetuated by bad-faith actors".

== Home media releases ==
This episode is featured on the Star Trek: The Next Generation – Jean-Luc Picard Collection DVD set for Region 1 only, released in 2004.

CBS announced on September 28, 2011, in celebration of the series' twenty-fifth anniversary, that Star Trek: The Next Generation would be completely re-mastered in 1080p high definition from the original 35mm film negatives. For the remaster almost 25,000 reels of original film stock were rescanned and reedited, and all visual effects were digitally recomposed from original large-format negatives and newly created CGI shots. The release was accompanied by 7.1 DTS Master Audio. On July 30, 2013 "The Drumhead" was released on 1080p high definition as part of the Season 4 Blu-ray box set in the United States. The set was released on July 29, 2013, in the United Kingdom.

This episode was released in the United States on September 3, 2002, as part of the Star Trek: The Next Generation season four DVD box set.
