= Paradise Found (musical) =

- Music: Johann Strauss II
- Lyrics: Ellen Fitzhugh
- Book: Richard Nelson
- Basis: Joseph Roth novel The Tale of the 1002nd Night
- Productions: 2010 London

Paradise Found is a musical based on the Joseph Roth novel Die Geschichte von der 1002. Nacht (The Tale of the 1002nd Night). The musical's book is by Richard Nelson, with lyrics by Ellen Fitzhugh set to the music of Johann Strauss II. It premiered in 2010 at London's Menier Chocolate Factory in a production co-directed by Hal Prince and Susan Stroman.

== Production history ==
In an interview, Hal Prince said that the musical would "center on a Middle Eastern ruler who travels to Vienna in search of romantic 'inspiration,' and the machinations that occur when he demands a rendezvous with a noblewoman who turns out to be the empress of Austria." It had been planned to bring the musical to Broadway after its premiere in London. Early readings featured John Cullum, Mandy Patinkin, Shuler Hensley, Judy Kaye, Emily Skinner, Rebecca Luker and Kate Baldwin.

Paradise Found opened in London on May 26, 2010, after previews starting on May 19, at the Menier Chocolate Factory and closed on June 26. The musical was directed by Prince and Susan Stroman (who also choreographed), with scenic design by Beowulf Boritt, costume design by Judith Dolan and arrangements and orchestrations by Jonathan Tunick. The cast featured John McMartin as the Shah of Persia, Mandy Patinkin as a Eunuch, Shuler Hensley as the Baron, Judy Kaye as Frau Matzner and Kate Baldwin as Mizzi.

== Songs ==
Source: CurtainUp

Act 1

- Overture
- Once and Now - Shah, Eunuch, Grand Vizier
- Train Station - Company
- Perfect Love - Eunuch, Girls
- Feeling Good - Mizzi, the Baron
- Ev'ry Little Bit - Soap Manufacturer's Wife, Eunuch, Customers
- The Bat - Instrumental
- Faces Like Flow'rs - Eunuch, Women, Men
- Fanfare/Marziale Instrumental
- Empress of Fantasy -The Baron, Eunuch
- Without Desire - Eunuch, the Baron, Frau Matzner, Shah

Act 2

- Never Better - Mizzi, the Baron, Eunuch, Frau Matzner
- Save This Empire - General, Gossips, Women, the Emperor, Chorus
- Feeling Good (Reprise) - Mizzi, the Baron
- The Same Lovely Vienna - Customers
- How Could You Know - Frau Matzner, Customers
- What Are They? - Baron Mizzi
- Ve Made a Em-per-ess - Baron Trummer
- Perfect Love (Reprise) - Eunuch, Wives
- Finale
  - Without Desire - Eunuch, the Baron, Frau Matzner, Mizzi, Chorus
  - Feeling Good - Baron, Mizzi, Harem Women, Women, Men
  - Save This Empire - Company

== Critical response ==
As reported by The New York Times, critics "cited flaws in pretty much every aspect of the musical." The British Theatre Guide reviewer noted that "'Paradise Found' is a serviceable light comedy musical but with the talents available, many visitors might have hoped for an evening a little closer to Paradise."

== Cast ==
2010 Menier Chocolate Factory Premiere

- Shah of Persia: John McMartin
- Eunuch: Mandy Patinkin
- Baron: Shuler Hensley
- Frau Matzner: Judy Kaye
- Mizzi: Kate Baldwin
- Grand Vizier: George Lee Andrews
- Soap Manufacturer's Wife: Nancy Opel
- with Amanda Kloots-Larsen, Lacey Kohl, Herndon Lackey, Daniel Marcus, Jim Poulos, Martin Van Treuren, and Pamela Winslow Kashani
