= Edward Wiley (actor) =

American film, stage and television actor

- Wiley in Star Trek: The Next Generation, 1991
- Born: July 11, 1955
- Died: October 16, 1995 (aged 40)
- Occupations: Film and television actor

Edward Wiley (July 11, 1955 – October 16, 1995) was an American film and television actor.

== Life and career ==
Wiley was born on July 11, 1955, the son of Raymond Wiley. He attended the Guildhall School of Music and Drama, and was a member of The Old Vic, a nonprofit producing theatre. He began his screen career in 1981, appearing in the film Chariots of Fire. In the same year, he appeared in the film Ragtime.

Later in his career, in 1991, Wiley guest-starred as Governor Vagh in the episode "The Mind's Eye" of the syndicated science fiction television series Star Trek: The Next Generation. He guest-starred in television programs including Star Trek: Deep Space Nine, NYPD Blue, Jake and the Fatman, Hunter and Max Headroom. He also appeared in films such as The Canterville Ghost, Sniper, Highlander, Superman III and Haunted Honeymoon. He last appeared in the 1996 film Final Vendetta; the film was released after his death.

== Death ==
Wiley died on October 16, 1995, at the age of 40.
