= Future Imperfect =

- Star Trek: The Next Generation episode
- Episode no.: Season 4 Episode 8
- Directed by: Les Landau
- Written by: J. Larry Carroll; David Bennett Carren
- Production code: 182
- Original air date: November 12, 1990

Guest appearances
- Andreas Katsulas – Tomalak; Chris Demetral – Jean-Luc/Ethan; Carolyn McCormick – Minuet; Patti Yasutake – Alyssa Ogawa; Todd Merrill – Gleason; April Grace – Hubbell; George O'Hanlon Jr. - Transporter Chief; Dana Tjowander – Barash

Episode chronology
← Previous "Reunion"	Next → "Final Mission"
- Star Trek: The Next Generation season 4

"Future Imperfect" is the 82nd episode of the American science fiction television series Star Trek: The Next Generation. It is the eighth episode of the fourth season.

Set in the 24th century, the series follows the adventures of the Starfleet crew of the Federation starship Enterprise-D. In this episode, during an away mission, Riker falls unconscious and awakens to discover that sixteen years have passed, and he is now captain of the Enterprise. Having no memory whatsoever of the time that has passed, he begins to suspect that the future he finds himself in may not be real.

== Plot ==
Commander Riker's birthday celebration is interrupted as he, Geordi La Forge, and Worf are sent down to a huge cavern on Alpha Onias III, an uninhabited Class M planet, to investigate unusual readings. After their arrival, the cavern suddenly fills with toxic gases, and the three officers fall unconscious.

Riker wakes up in sick bay to find that sixteen years have passed. He is now Captain of the Enterprise with Data as his first officer, and Picard has been promoted to Admiral, with Deanna Troi serving as his aide. Riker cannot remember any event after the Alpha Onias III mission, which Doctor Crusher explains is a side effect of a viral infection he contracted on the planet, and his memories of the intervening events may or may not return.

Riker learns that he was married, is now widowed, and has a son (Chris Demetral) named Jean-Luc (named after Picard). He is further startled when Tomalak — a Romulan commander who was formerly an archenemy of the Enterprise, now an ambassador — beams onto the ship to negotiate a peace treaty with the Federation. Despite Picard's reassurances, Riker is hesitant to reveal sensitive Starfleet information in negotiating the treaty.

As Riker struggles to adjust to his new life, numerous inconsistencies arise. The Enterprise computer is uncharacteristically slow, numerous systems experience minor technical glitches, and Geordi is unable to correct the problems. Finally, Riker discovers that his late wife "Min" is Minuet, a fictional holodeck character he once met. (Note: As depicted in 11001001 (S1E15, 1988).) Riker realizes that the entire "future" he has been experiencing is a charade and confronts Picard and Tomalak on the Enterprise bridge, with more inconsistencies arising as he does so, proving his suspicions. Suddenly, the false future fades away, revealing a Romulan holodeck. Commander Tomalak is revealed to be behind the simulation, the object of which was to trick Riker into giving away the location of a key Federation outpost. The Romulans, Tomalak explains, were fooled by the intensity of Riker's memories of Minuet and had incorporated her into their fantasy on the assumption that she was real.

Riker is put in a holding area, where he meets the boy whose image the Romulans had used to create his "son". The boy identifies himself as "Ethan". They escape and briefly elude their Romulan guards. However, as they are hiding from their pursuers, Ethan inadvertently refers to Tomalak as "Ambassador", instead of "Commander". Riker realizes that he is still in a simulation; confronting Ethan over it, he demands that the game end immediately and that he be allowed to leave.

Everything disappears once more, leaving only Riker and Ethan back in the cavern on Alpha Onias III. Riker is then able to contact the ship and learns that Worf and La Forge had beamed up without incident, but the Enterprise was unable to locate him. After Riker advises the captain that he will presently report back after learning more about his situation, Ethan confesses that he had created the simulations, using sophisticated scanners to read his mind and create the "reality" they experienced. Ethan's planet had been attacked and his people killed; his mother had hidden him in the cavern for his own safety, with all the simulation equipment, before she died; and Ethan, all alone, had been yearning for real companionship. Realizing Ethan's intentions were not hostile, Riker offers him refuge on the Enterprise. Ethan accepts Riker's offer and after Ethan reveals his true form as a grey alien named Barash. They beam onto the ship.

== Reception ==
Zach Handlen of The A.V. Club gave the episode a grade A−.

In 2017, Popular Mechanics said that "Future Imperfect" was one of the top ten 'most fun' episodes of Star Trek: The Next Generation. In 2019, CBR rated "Future Imperfect" the 5th best 'holodeck' episode of the Star Trek franchise.

In 2016, Empire ranked this the 26th best out of the top 50 episodes of all the 700 plus Star Trek television episodes.

In 2020, Tom's Guide listed this as one of the best episodes for Riker (played by Jonathan Frakes).

== Releases ==
"Future Imperfect" was released in the United States on September 3, 2002, as part of the Star Trek: The Next Generation season four DVD box set.
