= JORDY =

Optical viewing device

JORDY or Joint Optical Reflective Display is an optical viewing device developed based on NASA technology. It is used to help the visually impaired see and read.

The name is inspired by the Star Trek character, Geordi La Forge.
