= Remember Me (Star Trek: The Next Generation) =

- Star Trek: The Next Generation episode
- Episode no.: Season 4 Episode 5
- Directed by: Cliff Bole
- Written by: Lee Sheldon
- Cinematography by: Marvin Rush
- Production code: 179
- Original air date: October 22, 1990

Guest appearances
- Eric Menyuk - The Traveler; Bill Erwin - Dalen Quaice; Colm Meaney - Miles O'Brien; Majel Barrett - Computer Voice (Uncredited)

Episode chronology
← Previous "Suddenly Human"	Next → "Legacy"
- Star Trek: The Next Generation season 4

"Remember Me" is the 79th episode of the syndicated American science-fiction television series Star Trek: The Next Generation, the fifth episode of the fourth season.

== Plot ==
The USS Enterprise docks at Starbase 133, where Dr. Beverly Crusher (Gates McFadden) greets her elderly friend and mentor, Dr. Dalen Quaice (Bill Erwin). After taking him to his quarters, discussing the loss of old friends, Dr. Crusher visits her son Ensign Wesley Crusher (Wil Wheaton) in Engineering. Wesley attempts to create a static warp bubble, but the experiment appears to fail. As the Enterprise leaves Starbase, Dr. Crusher finds that Dr. Quaice is missing, with no record of him coming aboard the ship. As she performs a medical test on transporter chief O'Brien (Colm Meaney), she realizes that her medical staff is missing; further investigation and discussion with the crew show that she has always worked alone in sick bay.

Dr. Crusher continues to try to track down the disappearing people and finds more and more crew members that she remembers being completely unknown to the crew or the computer. At one point, a vortex appears near Dr. Crusher and attempts to pull her in, but she is able to hold on to a fixture until it dissipates; the ship shows no record of the vortex's appearance when she investigates. Eventually, no one but Captain Picard (Patrick Stewart) and herself remain on the ship, but Picard believes that the situation is normal. Picard orders the computer to give his vital signs verbally over the ship's speakers so she knows he is still there, but shortly thereafter, even he disappears. Then, the vortex reappears, and once again tries to claim Beverly. She is blown across the bridge, but she manages to hang onto Lieutenant Commander Data's (Brent Spiner) chair until the vortex disappears.

At this point, the viewer is shown the actual Enterprise, where Wesley had successfully created the warp bubble, accidentally trapping his mother within it. With the warp bubble collapsing rapidly, Wesley's fears lead the Traveler (Eric Menyuk) to appear and help Wesley attempt to stabilize the bubble. The Traveler recommends the Enterprise return to the Starbase, where the warp bubble was formed and may be more stable.

Within the warp bubble, Dr. Crusher attempts to direct the Enterprise to the home planet of the Traveler, but soon finds the ship is unable to set that destination, as it no longer exists. More of the universe she knows disappears, soon leaving only the Enterprise. She recognizes the shape as being that of Wesley's warp bubbles, and determines that she is trapped, the earlier vortex being the Enterprise crew's first attempt to save her. As the warp bubble shrinks, erasing parts of the Enterprise, she races for Engineering, the center of the warp bubble, and finds a vortex waiting there. She jumps in at the last moment, finding herself back in Engineering along with Picard, Wesley, Geordi La Forge (LeVar Burton), and the Traveler. She embraces her son and obtains confirmation from Picard that the Enterprise's population (1,014 at the time, including her guest Dr. Quaice) is the correct number.

== Reception ==
Io9 rated "Remember Me" as the 78th-best episode of Star Trek in 2014.

In 2021, Screen Rant said this was an instance of a Star Trek episode exploring the fear of being alone.

== Home video ==
"Remember Me" was released in the United States on September 3, 2002, as part of the Star Trek: The Next Generation season four DVD box set.

== See also ==
- "Where No One Has Gone Before", the first-season episode where the Traveler is first introduced
- "The Mark of Gideon", the Star Trek: The Original Series episode where Captain James Kirk, unbeknownst to him, is beamed onto a replica of the Enterprise, and he thinks he is alone.
- "Revisions", a Stargate SG-1 episode with a similar plot
- "And When the Sky Was Opened", an episode of The Twilight Zone with a similar plot
- The Demolished Man, by Alfred Bester. The ending chapters have a similar plot
