= Ellen Fitzhugh =

American musical theatre lyricist and librettist

Ellen Fitzhugh (July 5, 1942 – July 14, 2023) was an American musical theatre lyricist and librettist. She was most notable for lyrics to the Broadway musical Grind, for which she was nominated for the 1985 Tony Award for Best Original Score.

Other musicals included Herringbone, Paper Moon, Don Juan de Marco, Paradise Found and Los Otros.

For film, she contributed lyrics to songs in The Great Mouse Detective and The Brave Little Toaster to the Rescue.
