= The Mind's Eye (Star Trek: The Next Generation) =

- Star Trek: The Next Generation episode
- Geordi undergoes brainwashing treatments.
- Episode no.: Season 4 Episode 24
- Directed by: David Livingston
- Story by: René Echevarria; Ken Schafer
- Teleplay by: René Echevarria
- Cinematography by: Marvin V. Rush
- Production code: 198
- Original air date: May 27, 1991

Guest appearances
- Larry Dobkin - Kell; John Fleck - Taibak; Colm Meaney - Miles O'Brien; Edward Wiley - Governor Vagh; Denise Crosby - Voice of Romulan Commander; Majel Barrett - Computer Voice

Episode chronology
← Previous "The Host"	Next → "In Theory"
- Star Trek: The Next Generation season 4

"The Mind's Eye" is the 98th episode of the American syndicated science fiction television series Star Trek: The Next Generation, the 24th episode of the fourth season. David Livingston made his directoral debut at the helm of this episode.

Set in the 24th century, the series follows the adventures of the Starfleet crew of the Federation starship Enterprise-D. In this episode, the Enterprise's chief engineer Geordi La Forge sets out for a vacation on the resort planet Risa, but his shuttle is apprehended by Romulans who hope to use him in a plot to drive a wedge between the United Federation of Planets and its Klingon allies. La Forge returns to the Enterprise with no memory of the encounter — nor of the fact that he's just been exposed to days of mind control techniques that have turned him into an assassin.

This episode is inspired by the 1962 movie The Manchurian Candidate, with Levar Burton (Geordi) in the Laurence Harvey role, Romulans in the role played by Khigh Dhiegh, and a Klingon in the Angela Lansbury role. Director David Livingston was an admirer of the movie, and had hoped to include a cast member from the movie as an extra, but was unable to do so. Instead, Livingston introduced an homage shot in the scene where a brainwashed La Forge kills a simulation of Miles O'Brien.

== Plot ==
Geordi La Forge, en route to Risa for an academic conference, is captured by Romulans. While an impostor that looks like La Forge is sent to Risa, the Romulans restrain La Forge and exploit his VISOR—a device that gives the blind La Forge vision—to tap into his visual cortex, giving them a limited form of mind control over him. After several days, La Forge's mind is wiped of his capture but given memories of going to Risa, and he is put back aboard his shuttle, to return to the Enterprise. He arrives as the Enterprise crew are working with the Klingon Ambassador Kell to deal with a rebel movement on Krios, a Klingon colony near the Federation border. The governor of the colony, Vagh, asserts that the rebellion is being aided by the Federation, thus requiring the Federation's presence to resolve.

At the colony, Vagh shows Captain Picard and Kell that Federation-designed weapons have been taken from the rebels. Picard orders his crew to investigate. Lt. Commander Data detects strange E-band radiation but cannot identify the source. He and La Forge also discover the apparent Federation weapons were replicated using Romulan technology and powered by Romulan energy cells. Later, under the direction of his controllers, La Forge unknowingly transports a case of Federation weapons from the Enterprise to the rebel base, and then subsequently erases the logs. Vagh, monitoring the transport, immediately accuses the Enterprise of deception. Data and La Forge review the transport logs but that, even though the transport originated from the Enterprise, the records have been erased; La Forge observes that only he, Data, and two other crewmembers could have falsified the logs in that manner, and he is the only one with no alibi. Again outside of his control, La Forge enters Kell's quarters on the Enterprise, where Kell orders La Forge to assassinate Vagh in a public setting before witnesses in such a manner as to utterly convince Vagh's people of Federation involvement.

At Kell's suggestion, Picard invites Vagh aboard the Enterprise to observe the investigation into the unauthorized transport. As Picard takes Vagh around the ship, Data discovers that the E-band radiation is coming from aboard the Enterprise and that La Forge never made it to Risa. He orders Security Chief Worf to immediately detain La Forge. The assassination attempt is blocked, and Data arrives to explain the situation, saying that the limited transmission range means the device controlling La Forge must either be in Picard's or Kell's possession. Kell refuses to undergo a search, but Vagh offers to take him to the colony to do so there. Fearing the consequences of being investigated by his own people, Kell quickly requests asylum aboard the Enterprise, which Picard says they will consider after his name is cleared of any wrongdoing by the Klingons. Kell is taken away by Vagh's guards. La Forge is cleared but struggles to understand what happened to him.

== Reception ==
In 2012, Wired said this is one of the best episodes of Star Trek: The Next Generation.

In 2017, Vulture listed this episode as one of the best of Star Trek: The Next Generation.

== Home video ==
This episode was released in the United States on September 3, 2002, as part of the Star Trek: The Next Generation season four DVD box set.

CBS announced on September 28, 2011, in celebration of the series' twenty-fifth anniversary, that Star Trek: The Next Generation would be completely re-mastered in 1080p high definition from the original 35mm film negatives. For the remaster almost 25,000 reels of original film stock were rescanned and reedited, and all visual effects were digitally recomposed from original large-format negatives and newly created CGI shots. The release was accompanied by 7.1 DTS Master Audio. On July 30, 2013 "The Mind's Eye" was released on 1080p high definition as part of the Season 4 Blu-ray box set in the United States. The set was released on July 29, 2013, in the United Kingdom.
