= The Canterville Ghost (1996 film) =

1996 American television film by Sydney Macartney

- Release poster
- Genre: Family; Drama; Fantasy
- Based on: "The Canterville Ghost"; 1887 short story by Oscar Wilde
- Teleplay by: Robert Benedetti
- Story by: Oscar Wilde
- Directed by: Sydney Macartney
- Starring: Patrick Stewart; Neve Campbell
- Music by: Ernest Troost
- Country of origin: United States
- Original language: English

Production
- Executive producers: Richard Welsh; Brent Shields
- Producers: Patrick Stewart; Malcolm J. Christopher; Robert Benedetti
- Production locations: Knebworth House, Stevenage, Hertfordshire, England, UK
- Cinematography: Dennis C. Lewiston
- Editors: Jim Oliver; Paul Martin Smith
- Running time: 92 minutes
- Production companies: Signboard Hill Productions; Anasazi Co.

Original release
- Network: ABC
- Release: January 27, 1996

The Canterville Ghost is a 1996 family film directed by Sydney Macartney. The mystery, romance, and adventure stars Patrick Stewart and Neve Campbell; it is based on an 1887 Oscar Wilde short story of the same title which was serialized in the magazine The Court and Society Review. This story has been adapted to film and made-for-TV movies several times since the original film of the same name.

Filming was done at Knebworth House in Hertfordshire.

== Plot ==
Hiram Otis comes to England with his wife, daughter and two sons on a research grant; he and his family temporarily stay in a castle called Canterville Hall. The castle is haunted by the ghost of Sir Simon de Canterville, an ancestor doomed to remain on the estate after his wife's death. To send the family packing, he begins a ghostly reign of terror. As is revealed by the current Lord Canterville (Sir Simon's descendant) and the servants Mr. and Mrs. Umney, previous Canterville Hall residents have all been frightened away by Sir Simon. The locals wager on how long the Otis family will stay.

Ginny, the Otis' daughter, discovers a mysterious prophecy regarding the house's history, and a secret passage in the library leading to a cell where Sir Simon resides during the day with his raven familiar Gabriel. She and her brothers later see Sir Simon, though her parents dismiss it as Ginny pranking her siblings. Ginny meets and becomes attracted to Francis, the young Duke of Cheshire, who has also seen Sir Simon's ghost. Unfortunately, Hiram does not believe in ghosts and accuses Ginny of trying to scare the family so they will return to Indiana.

Sir Simon becomes infuriated by the family's resilience and is himself scared by a fake ghost that the boys build. Angrily chasing the Otis children, Sir Simon causes Ginny to get into more trouble with her father—whose skepticism prevents his seeing Sir Simon. Ginny uses the secret passage to return to the cell and ends up befriending him. Later, Francis explains to Ginny that Sir Simon was suspected of murdering his wife, Lady Eleanor, and his fate remains unknown. Sir Simon appears to Ginny and advises her to not let her fears ruin her chances of finding true love. Ginny follows his advice and makes her feelings apparent to Francis.

Hiram, still blaming Ginny for the strange happenings, decides to send Ginny home to Indiana. Going to Sir Simon for help, Ginny explains how her father does not believe in ghosts (much to the ghost's bemusement). They plot to trick Hiram into believing by performing a scene from Hamlet with Sir Simon as the ghost of Hamlet's father. During the performance, however, Sir Simon becomes distraught and disappears halfway through the scene, with Hiram insisting it was a special effect (although the rest of the family are sure it was a real ghost).

Ginny discovers that the lines of the play evoked sad memories for Sir Simon. He confesses that he drove his wife insane after being tricked into thinking she had been unfaithful and that Lady Eleanor killed herself. Surrendering himself to Eleanor's family for punishment, Sir Simon was locked in the cell to starve and cursed by a witch, who condemned him to haunt the house by night and lament the death of his wife by day. Sir Simon can only rest if he is redeemed and allowed to pass on. Sir Simon reveals Ginny has partially fulfilled the prophecy by weeping for him. Next, she must pray for him. Sir Simon takes her through a portal in the fireplace to the "Realm of Darkness" to plead to the Angel of Death on his behalf.

The next morning, Hiram goes to Ginny's bedroom to make amends but she is missing. Panicking, the family search the house and estate aided by Francis, the Umneys, Lord Canterville and the locals. They find the cloak Ginny was wearing in the library and everyone but Hiram realises that Ginny has been taken by the ghost. Hiram hears Ginny's voice in his mind and sees her image in Sir Simon's portrait, causing him to start believing in ghosts. That night, they hear a mysterious noise and rush to the library, where the fireplace opens to reveal Ginny trying to get home from the Realm of Darkness. Her family and Francis rescue her before the portal closes.

Ginny takes the family to Sir Simon's cell where they find his chained skeleton. Gabriel disappears, no longer needed, and they hear the broken chapel bell ring out. Outside, a dead almond tree returns to life and blooms, fulfilling the prophecy and confirming that Sir Simon is redeemed.

The family decide to stay at Canterville indefinitely and with Lord Canterville's blessing. He gives Ginny a ring that belonged to Lady Eleanor and has Sir Simon's remains buried in the garden beside Lady Eleanor. Francis and Ginny visit the grave and Ginny thanks Sir Simon for everything he taught her about life, death, and how love is stronger than both. Ghostly voices are heard, implying that Sir Simon has been reunited with his wife and is finally happy.

== Cast ==
- Patrick Stewart - Sir Simon de Canterville (The Ghost)
- Neve Campbell - Virginia 'Ginny' Otis
- Daniel Betts - Francis, Duke of Cheshire
- Cherie Lunghi - Lucille Otis
- Edward Wiley - Hiram (Harry) Otis
- Raymond Pickard - Washington Otis
- Ciarán Fitzgerald - Adam Otis
- Joan Sims - Mrs. Umney
- Donald Sinden - Mr. Umney
- Leslie Phillips - Henry, Lord Canterville

== Awards ==
- Emmy - 1996 - Outstanding Music Composition for a Miniseries or a Special - Ernest Troost
- Family Film Award - 1996 - Best Actor - TV - Patrick Stewart
- Family Film Award - 1996 - Best Actress - TV - Neve Campbell
- Family Film Award - 1996 - Best Television Film - Sydney Macartney
- Family Film Award - 1996 - Outstanding Television Film - Robert Benedetti
- Saturn Award - 1997 - Best Single Genre Television Presentation (nomination)

== See also ==
- List of ghost films
