= Marta DuBois =

Panamanian actress (1952–2018)

- Marta DuBois in Magnum P.I. 1987
- Born: December 15, 1952; David, Chiriquí, Panama
- Died: May 8, 2018 (aged 65); Los Angeles, California, U.S.
- Occupation: Actress
- Years active: 1977–2018
- Known for: Magnum, P.I.; Devil's Due; Tales of the Gold Monkey; The Trial of the Incredible Hulk; McBride

Marta Estela DuBois (December 15, 1952 – May 8, 2018) was a Panamanian-American actress. DuBois had a steady career on episodes of numerous television series and films. She gained attention in a recurring role as wife of Thomas Magnum in Magnum, P.I., and may be best known as the female lead – homicide detective Roberta Hansen – in the McBride franchise of 10 television films.

== Early years ==
DuBois was born in David, Chiriquí, Panama.

== Career ==
DuBois co-starred in the single season of the television series Tales of the Gold Monkey, which ran from September 1982 through June 1983. DuBois had a recurring role on Magnum, P.I. and made guest appearances on series such as Hardcastle and McCormick; Vega$; The A-Team; L.A. Law; Silk Stalkings; Martin (TV series); Matlock; Walker, Texas Ranger and Star Trek: The Next Generation.

She made her film debut with a supporting role in the 1979 drama Boulevard Nights. She followed this with roles in the films Dead Badge (1995), and Black Out (1996). DuBois played actress Rita Gam, close friend and bridesmaid of the future Princess Grace of Monaco, in the 1983 television film Grace Kelly, and appeared in the television movie The Trial of the Incredible Hulk (1989).

In 2000, DuBois co-starred in the romantic comedy Luminarias. Between 2005 and 2008, DuBois played Sergeant Roberta Hansen in ten McBride television movies.

She portrayed Dora in the television western Lone Rider (2008) and had a guest role as Maria Cordero in the Law & Order: Los Angeles episode "Ballona Creek" (2010).

== Death ==
On May 8, 2018, DuBois died of a brain aneurysm in Los Angeles, California, at age 65.

== Filmography ==
=== Film ===
Year	Title	Role
1979	Boulevard Nights	Shady Landeros
1990	Fear	Inez Villanueva
1994	Dead Badge	Billie Torres
1996	Blackout	Sharon Gray
1998	Picture of Purity	Diane Rose
2000	Luminaries	Sofia

=== Television ===
Year	Title	Role	Notes
1980	Trapper John, M.D.	Elena	"Quarantine"
1980	Vega$	Angela	"Vendetta"
1981	Trapper John, M.D.	Irene	"Cooperative Care"
1981–1988	Magnum, P.I.	Michelle Hue	Recurring role (6 episodes)
1982	Voyagers!	Margaret	"Agents of Satan"
1982–83	Tales of the Gold Monkey	Princess Koji	Main role (21 episodes)
1983	Grace Kelly	Rita Gam	TV film
1983	Hardcastle and McCormick	Tina Grey	"The Black Widow"
1983	Matt Houston	Daphne	"The Crying Clown"
1984	Trapper John, M.D.	Rita	"Play Your Hunch"
1984	Riptide	Sheila / Marcy Hayward	"Double Your Pleasure"
1984	Hawaiian Heat	Maggie Aoki	TV film
1984	The A-Team	Bobbi Cardina	"The Bend in the River: Parts 1 & 2"
1985	MacGruder and Loud	Linda Braddock	"Odds Favor Death"
1985	Generation	Kate Mendez Breed	TV film
1986	Crazy Like a Fox	Suzanne / Marilyn	"You Can't Keep a Good Corpse Down"
1986	Starman	Dr. Ellen Dukow	"Fever"
1987	MacGyver	Dr. Barbara Ortega	"Pirates"
1987	L.A. Law	Gwen Fuller	"The Grace of Wrath"
1988	Matlock	Carol Weston	"The Lovelorn"
1989	The Trial of the Incredible Hulk	Ellie Mendez	TV film
1991	Star Trek: The Next Generation	Ardra	"Devil's Due"
1991	She-Wolf of London	Nancy Chambers	"Habeas Corpses"
1992	Matlock	Ava Brodsky	"The Assassination: Parts 1 & 2"
1992	Land of the Lost	The Siren	"Siren's Song"
1992	Silk Stalkings	Helen McCabe	"Shock Jock"
1993	Silk Stalkings	Brenda Logan	"Daddy Dearest"
1994	Murder, She Wrote	Maria Garcia	"Time to Die"
1994–95	Martin	Maria Rodriguez	"Go Tell It on the Martin", "Xpress Yourself"
1995	Renegade	Lucy Sherman	"Broken on the Wheel of Love"
1995	Sisters	Rosa Maria Castio	"Matters of the Heart", "Enchanted May"
1995	Walker, Texas Ranger	Angela Kale	"Blown Apart"
1996	Midnight Heat	Sharon Gray	TV film
1996	Time Well Spent	Lucy Castillo	TV film
1997	Trials of Life	Mrs. Grantos	TV film
1998	Silk Stalkings	Jane Chambers	"If the Shoe Fits"
2000	The King of Queens	Eva	"Party Favor"
2000	That's Life	Betty	"The Tell-Tale Uterus"
2001	Even Stevens	Mrs. Estrada	"Strictly Ballroom"
2001	The Division	Dr. Olvidos	"The Fear Factor"
2005–2007	McBride	Sgt. Roberta Hansen	TV film series
2008	Lone Rider	Dora	TV film
2010	Law & Order: LA	Maria Cordero	"Ballona Creek"
2013	Bones	Maureen Serrano	"The Diamond in the Rough"
