= Les Landau =

American film and television director

- Occupations: Television director; film director; film producer
- Father: Ely Landau

Les Landau is an American film and television director and film producer. He is best known for his work on the Star Trek franchise from 1987 to 2002, having worked on four Star Trek shows: The Next Generation, Deep Space Nine, Voyager and Enterprise. His work on Enterprise was his final professional work.

== Early life ==
Landau is one of five children born to television and film producer Ely Landau. His stepmother was film producer Edie Landau. His family is of Jewish background.

== Directing work ==
Landau's earliest credit was as production assistant on the 1973 film The Iceman Cometh, produced by his father, Ely Landau. By 1976 he was serving as assistant director, on the film Leadbelly, starring Madge Sinclair and Albert Hall, and as first assistant director on the television series Dynasty and T.J. Hooker.

He has also directed episodes for such television series as Beverly Hills, 90210, seaQuest DSV, Lois & Clark: The New Adventures of Superman, M.A.N.T.I.S., Sliders, JAG, and Dark Angel.

Actor Garret Wang recalled Les Landau directing the Voyager episode "The Chute". Wang said that while he tried to focus on his part, the series' other actors often engaged Landau about possible directing opportunities. The cast had just begun to direct the series (Wang's co-star McNeil had made his directing debut on the preceding episode), and the others were excited about their own prospects.

Landau produced and directed Archibald the Rainbow Painter (1998), a fictional film about Vietnam veterans, written by Laura Landau.

== Star Trek credits ==
=== The Next Generation ===
- "Code of Honor" (Uncredited, replaced Russ Mayberry during production)
- "The Arsenal of Freedom"
- "The Schizoid Man"
- "Samaritan Snare"
- "The Survivors"
- "Deja Q"
- "Sins of the Father"
- "Sarek"
- "Family"
- "Future Imperfect"
- "Clues"
- "Night Terrors"
- "Half a Life"
- "Ensign Ro"
- "Unification I"
- "Conundrum"
- "Time's Arrow, Part I"
- "Time's Arrow, Part II"
- "Chain of Command, Part II"
- "Tapestry"
- "Dark Page"

=== Deep Space Nine ===
- "Progress"
- "The Forsaken"
- "Invasive Procedures"
- "Sanctuary"
- "Whispers"
- "The House of Quark"
- "Second Skin"
- "Destiny"
- "Crossfire"
- "Accession"
- "Broken Link"
- "By Inferno's Light"
- "Image in the Sand"
- "Afterimage"

=== Voyager ===
- "Time and Again"
- "Prime Factors"
- "Heroes and Demons"
- "Alliances"
- "Investigations"
- "The Chute"
- "Drone"
- "Virtuoso"
- "Counterpoint"

=== Enterprise ===
- "Sleeping Dogs"
