= Clues (Star Trek: The Next Generation) =

- Star Trek: The Next Generation episode
- Episode no.: Season 4 Episode 14
- Directed by: Les Landau
- Story by: Bruce D. Arthurs
- Teleplay by: Bruce D. Arthurs; Joe Menosky
- Production code: 188
- Original air date: February 11, 1991

Guest appearances
- Colm Meaney - Miles O'Brien; Rhonda Aldrich - Madeline; Pamela Winslow - Ensign McKnight; Whoopi Goldberg - Guinan; Patti Yasutake - Alyssa Ogawa; Thomas Knickerbocker - Gunman

Episode chronology
← Previous "Devil's Due"	Next → "First Contact"
- Star Trek: The Next Generation season 4

"Clues" is the 14th episode of the fourth season of the American science fiction television series Star Trek: The Next Generation, it originally aired on February 11, 1991, in broadcast syndication. The teleplay was written by Bruce D. Arthurs and Joe Menosky from a story by Arthurs and was directed by Les Landau.

Set in the 24th century, the series follows the adventures of the Starfleet crew of the Federation starship Enterprise-D. While en route to investigate a mysterious planet, the entire crew, with the exception of Lieutenant Commander Data, is rendered unconscious by an apparent wormhole. After they revive, Data explains that they were unconscious for only thirty seconds but a variety of clues discovered around the ship seem to indicate that he is lying.

== Plot ==
The Enterprise investigates a T Tauri class star system with a single Class M planet that was picked up on a long-range sensor scan near the Ngame Nebula. As they approach the planet, the ship encounters a wormhole and everyone except Lt. Commander Data briefly loses consciousness. When the crew regains their senses, Data states they were unconscious for only thirty seconds. Following Data's suggestion, Captain Picard decides to send a probe into the system to avoid further harm to the ship. The probe reports only the presence of a frozen gas giant instead of the Class M planet from before; again, Data attributes this to the effects of the wormhole.

As the ship moves away from the system, the crew begin to find evidence that does not support Data's claims that they were unconscious for only 30 seconds. For example, Chief Medical Officer Dr. Crusher observes that her moss samples have shown a full day of growth that morning, and finds that Worf, complaining of a sore wrist, actually had his wrist broken and reset by a medical professional. Picard begins to suspect Data's claims; when he confronts Data on the issue, Data states that he cannot provide an answer. Further studies of the crew by Dr. Crusher show that Data's explanations are impossible; they have lost a day from the wormhole encounter, and there is evidence that Data tampered with the probe's readings to mask the Class M planet. Picard recognizes that Data's actions may be for the protection of the Enterprise, but orders the ship to return to the system.

When they near the Class M planet, Ship's Counselor Troi is taken over by a mysterious energy pulse from the system, and starts to speak to the crew with a different voice. The entity that has taken over Troi informs Data that the plan has failed, and that their people will prepare to destroy the Enterprise. Picard learns from Data and the entity that they are in the space of the Paxans, a highly advanced but very xenophobic race who have kept themselves hidden by firing a stun beam at any ship that nears their system and then moving it away; crews of such ships normally associate it with the effects of a wormhole and leave without incident. However, in the case of the Enterprise, the stun beam did not affect Data; Data had revived the crew as the Paxans were attempting to move the ship, forcing a physical encounter that led to Worf's wrist being broken. Picard was able to offer the Paxans a deal as to attempt to conceal their previous meeting, using memory-wiping technology from the Paxans to forget their encounters with them, and ordered Data to behave as he did to protect the ship.

Picard is able to convince the Paxan in control of Troi that the previous plan failed because they left too many clues on the Enterprise that piqued human curiosity to solve the mystery, and that if the Enterprise vanishes, it will cause others to come and investigate. The crew of the Enterprise, with the help of the Paxans, work together to completely eradicate any possible clues; once completed, the crew is stunned again, and the ship moves away from Paxan space. When the crew revives this time, they accept Data's explanations without question and continue on their mission.

== Reception ==
In 2012, Wired said this was one of the best episodes of Star Trek: The Next Generation. In 2016, Vox rated this one of the top 25 essential episodes of all Star Trek. In 2020, SyFy Wire noted this episode for its relationship between Picard and Data, which pits Data's loyalty against the ability of others to trust him.

In 2017, Netflix announced that "Clues" was one of four Star Trek: The Next Generation episodes (Note: Star Trek: The Next Generation was also represented on the list by "Q Who" and the two-part "The Best of Both Worlds". When compiling its top ten list, Netflix excluded the series premiere and second episode from each of the then-six series in the franchise, in order to "seek data beyond default behavior".) in the top ten most re-watched Star Trek franchise episodes on its streaming service, based on data since the franchise was added to Netflix in 2011.

In their book The Red Dwarf Programme Guide, Chris Howarth and Steve Lyons point out the "uncanny similarities" between "Clues" and the 1988 Red Dwarf episode "Thanks for the Memory". Howarth and Lyons note that both episodes have "the cast waking up to find that time has passed of which they have no memory. Despite the resistance of their mechanical crew member, they attempt to find out what has happened, but learn that they were better off not knowing. One of them even has a broken limb..."

== Home video ==
On May 25, 1996, episodes "Devil's Due" and "Clues" were released on LaserDisc in the United States. Published by Paramount Home Video, the single double-sided disc retailed for $34.95. The 12" video disc was in NTSC format with a Dolby Surround audio track. This episode was released in the United States on September 3, 2002, as part of the Star Trek: The Next Generation season four DVD box set. In July 2013 "Clues" was released in 1080p high definition as part of the Season 4 Blu-ray box set in the U.S. and UK.
