= Pamela Winslow =

American actress

Pamela Winslow is an actress and producer who appeared in film, stage musicals and television roles in the early 1990s. She was the original Rapunzel in the Sondheim-Lapine musical, Into the Woods.

== Early life ==
Winslow was born and raised in Maplewood, New Jersey, where she attended Columbia High School. Winslow later received a BFA in Acting/Musical Theatre at Carnegie Mellon University. She displayed musical ability by age 4 and began taking piano lessons when she was 6 years old. She also played flute in her school band and sang in the school's chorus and in her church's choir. She thought about becoming an opera singer, following the example of her coloratura soprano grandmother who sang German lieder. Her focus changed when, at age 13, she attended a summer camp that had a theatrical orientation. She was cast in the camp's production of Chicago, and performing in the show led her to think that she wanted to sing and act on stage. Her parents were supportive, including letting her take lessons in singing and dancing.

== Performing credits ==
Broadway/West End:

- Paradise Found (2010), as Ensemble
- Beauty and the Beast, as Babette (Replacement)
- Into the Woods (1997) as Rapunzel
- Meet Me in St. Louis (1990), as Lucille (Replacement)
- Into the Woods (1987–1989), as Rapunzel (U/S Cinderella, Florinda, and Lucinda)

Regional:

- The Music Man (1995), as Marian Paroo, Granada Theatre
- Hello, Dolly! (1994), as Irene, Granada Theatre
- Oklahoma! (1993), as Laurey Williams, Granada Theatre
- A Funny Thing Happened on the Way to the Forum (1990), as Philia, La Jolla Playhouse and Segerstrom Center for the Arts

== Filmography ==
- Steal Big Steal Little (1995), as Melanie
- Little Sister (1992), as The Girl
- Passionata (1992), as Liana Buckman
- Star Trek: The Next Generation
  - Ensign McKnight in "Clues" (1991), "In Theory" (1991), and "Face of the Enemy" (1993)
- They Came from Outer Space (1990–1991)
  - Cindy in "Look Who's Barking"
