= Suddenly Human =

- Star Trek: The Next Generation episode
- Episode no.: Season 4 Episode 4
- Directed by: Gabrielle Beaumont
- Story by: Ralph Phillips
- Teleplay by: John Whelpley; Jeri Taylor
- Cinematography by: Marvin Rush
- Production code: 176
- Original air date: October 15, 1990

Guest appearances
- Sherman Howard as Endar; Chad Allen as Jono/Jeremiah Rossa; Barbara Townsend as Adm. Connaught Rossa

Episode chronology
← Previous "Brothers"	Next → "Remember Me"
- Star Trek: The Next Generation season 4

"Suddenly Human" is the 78th episode of the American science fiction television series Star Trek: The Next Generation, the fourth episode of the fourth season.

Set in the 24th century, the series follows the adventures of the Starfleet crew of the Federation starship Enterprise-D. In this episode, the Enterprise rescues a Starfleet admiral's grandson, long thought dead, but who had been adopted and raised by the enemies who killed the boy's parents.

== Plot ==
The Enterprise responds to a distress call from a Talarian vessel. They rescue five teenaged crewmembers—four Talarian, and one human, Jono (Chad Allen). Jono keeps to himself, but shows strict obedience to Captain Picard, which together with some unexplained past injuries leads Doctor Crusher to suggest Jono may have been physically abused. It is determined that Jono is Jeremiah Rossa, a long-lost Federation citizen. His grandmother is a Starfleet admiral, and he was orphaned ten years before when his parents were killed in a skirmish with the Talarians. When the captain introduces the topic of Jono's human family, Jono becomes angry. After persistent effort by Picard, Jono's memories of the attack begin to return.

A Talarian ship arrives. Its captain, Endar, asks for a status on his son – Jono. Endar had claimed Jono as his own son after the boy's parents were killed ten years earlier, in keeping with the Talarian tradition of adopting the children of slain enemies to replace children of their own who die in battle. Endar explains Jono's injuries as the products of a boy trying to impress his father by participating in high-risk activities; Picard seems satisfied and observes that Endar seems to care for Jono. Picard allows Endar to see Jono, but when Jono says he wants to stay with Endar, Picard suspects the boy is afraid to say he wants to stay in the Federation. Endar insists that Jono will come back with him, even if the result is war between the Talarians and the Federation.

Returning to his vessel, Endar calls for reinforcements, as Picard decides to try to convince Jono to stay. After Jono receives a message from his grandmother, Picard takes the boy to play a form of racquetball, where Jono breaks down and cries. The crew believes they are making progress with the boy, but that night, Jono stabs the sleeping Picard in the chest. The blade deflects off Picard's sternum, causing only a minor wound, but the problem of where Jono should live is now compounded due to the assault he has just committed.

When Picard learns that Jono feels he cannot betray Endar by befriending Picard, the captain realizes he has been trying to impose his wishes on the boy. Just as Endar's patience is about to run out, Picard contacts the Talarians and lets them know he will let Jono go back. Jono bids Picard farewell with a Talarian ritual that is normally reserved for family members. He also removes his gloves which he had sworn to keep wearing in order not to touch an alien.

== Reviews ==
Jamahl Epsicokhan of TrekNation's Jammer's Reviews, pointed out that this was the third TNG episode in a row to deal with family issues. Epsicokhan called "Suddenly Human" the least effective of the three family-oriented episodes, criticizing the script by stating that the plot took too long to play out, and that the storyline was flat in parts. The reviewer was also disappointed that the Starfleet admiral's reaction to her request for custody being disregarded by Picard was left as an unresolved plot point.

== Releases ==
On February 27, 1996 "Best of Both Worlds, Part II" and "Suddenly Human" were released on LaserDisc in the USA. This paired episode 1, and episode 4 from season 4 on one double-sided 12 inch optical disc.

"Suddenly Human" was released in the United States on September 3, 2002, as part of the Star Trek: The Next Generation season four DVD box set.
