= Geordi La Forge =

Star Trek character

- LeVar Burton as Lieutenant Commander Geordi La Forge
- First appearance: "Encounter at Farpoint" (1987) (The Next Generation)
- Created by: Gene Roddenberry; D. C. Fontana
- Portrayed by: LeVar Burton

In-universe information
- Species: Human
- Gender: Male
- Title(s): Commodore (PIC: Season 3); Lieutenant Commander (TNG: Seasons 3–7, Movies); Lieutenant (TNG: Season 2); Lieutenant, Junior Grade (TNG: Season 1)
- Position: Head Curator (Starfleet Museum – PIC Season 3); Chief Engineer (USS Enterprise-E, USS Enterprise-D – TNG Seasons 2–7, Movies); Helmsman (USS Enterprise-D – TNG Season 1)
- Affiliation: United Federation of Planets; Starfleet
- Family: Edward La Forge (father); Silva La Forge (mother); Ariana La Forge (sister); Alandra La Forge (daughter); Sidney La Forge (daughter)
- Origin: Mogadishu, Somalia, Earth

Geordi La Forge (Note: Also spelled LaForge.) (/ˈdʒɔːrdi lə ˈfɔːrdʒ/ JOR-dee lə FORJ) is a fictional character who appeared in all seven seasons of the American science fiction television series Star Trek: The Next Generation and its four feature films as well as the third season of Star Trek: Picard. Portrayed by LeVar Burton, he served as helmsman of the USS Enterprise-D in the first season of The Next Generation, then occupied the role of the chief engineer for the rest of the series and in the films before appearing as a commodore in Picard. La Forge has been blind since his birth and uses technological devices that allow him to see – a VISOR in the series and the first film, replaced by ocular prosthetic implants in the last three films and in Picard.

== Concept and development ==
Gene Roddenberry created the character in honor of George La Forge, a quadriplegic fan of the original Star Trek series, who died in 1975. He was not the first to honor La Forge in the Star Trek franchise; a character directly named for George La Forge was written into the 1980 Star Trek novel The Galactic Whirlpool by David Gerrold.

A casting call was placed with agencies for the role, which described him as friends with Data, and specified that La Forge should have "perfect diction and might even have a Jamaican accent" and instructed those agencies not to submit "any 'street' types."

LeVar Burton auditioned for the role in 1986. He had previously appeared in Roots and other major network shows. He stated that "years ago I was doing a TV movie called Emergency Room and it was a fairly miserable experience. But there was a producer on that show, a man named Bob Justman.... six, seven years later, I get this call from Bob Justman and he's working at Paramount on this new Star Trek series and he said I remember your love of the show, we've got this character, would you be interested in coming in and seeing us? And I said was [franchise creator] Gene Roddenberry involved? He said he is. And I said I'll be right there." Roddenberry was very pleased with Burton at his first audition. Among the other actors considered for the role were Wesley Snipes, Reggie Jackson, Kevin Peter Hall, Clarence Gilyard, and Tim Russ, who would later play Tuvok on Star Trek: Voyager. Snipes was close to getting cast, but lost to Burton; he would later say that he was disappointed at first, but later said that he was grateful how things turned out saying if he had gotten the role he would have been in television more than film.

Burton also commented that he was anxious about his role, because he feared that The Next Generation was going to flop: "At the beginning, you know, there was a lot of conversation in the press at what a bad idea this was [but] I thought that since Gene was involved we had a real good shot of making a good show that would carry on in that tradition of Star Trek."

Throughout the series, Burton was equipped with Geordi La Forge's trademark VISOR, which he found extremely unpleasant to wear:

It's pretty much a living hell. 85 to 90% of my vision is taken away when the VISOR goes on. I bumped into everything the first season—light stands, overhead microphones, cables at my feet—I tripped over it all. So it's a sort of conundrum. The blind man, who puts on the VISOR and sees much more than everyone else around him, when the actor actually does that he's turned into a blind person. Then there was the pain. In the second season, we re-designed the VISOR and made it heavier and the way we actually affixed it was that we screwed it, we literally screwed it into my head and so there were screws that we would turn and there were flanges on the inside that would press into my temples and so after fifteen or twenty minutes of that I got headaches. So I had a daily headache for about six years. Which was also no fun.

At the start of the series' second season, Burton's character became Chief Engineering Officer, and thus was often portrayed repairing machines or discovering new scientific phenomena. Burton commented how hard it sometimes was to deliver the technobabble used by La Forge in these scenes with a straight face: "Technobabble brings with it its own challenge. I'm not an engineer, I just played one on TV. The methodology that I found most successful was to really spit it out as fast as I possibly could. Giving the illusion that I knew what I was talking about when, in fact, I really didn't."

Lt. (J.G.) Geordi La Forge
An away-mission regular who is racially black and birth-defect blind – although with prosthetic super-high tech artificial "eyes" which can detect electromagnetic waves from all the way from raw heat to high frequency ultra-violet, making other crewpersons seem hopelessly "blind" by comparison. His closest friend is Data, and the two of them are particularly efficient when working together on away missions. Because of his "eyes", Geordi can also perform some of the functions of a tricorder.

— Gene Roddenberry, Geordi La Forge's description, Star Trek: The Next Generation Writer/Director's Guide, March 23, 1987.

Asked about his favorite scenes, Burton answered that he especially liked holodeck adventures: "The Holmes and Watson episodes for Data and Geordi, the Robin Hood episode, you know, those were a lot of fun for us. I think the holodeck was a very cool concept, you know. You can create a three dimensional reality. I mean, how cool is that?"

Following the end of the series, Burton has stated how much he gained from The Next Generation; "When I got married my best man was Brent (Spiner, who portrayed the series character Lieutenant Commander Data) and my groomsmen were Michael (Dorn, Lieutenant Worf) and Jonathan (Frakes, Commander Riker) and Patrick (Stewart, Captain Picard). No matter what, we will always be family to each other. I mean in every respect. There have been times when there have been feuds within the family, when it hasn't been all hugs and kisses. But we have stuck together."

== VISOR ==
=== In universe ===
In the Star Trek fictional universe, a VISOR is a device used by the blind to artificially provide them with a sense of sight. A thin, curved device worn over the face like a pair of sunglasses, the VISOR scans the electromagnetic spectrum, creating visual input, and transmits it into the brain of the wearer via the optic nerves. The sensors are located on the convex side, that covers the eyes and attaches at small input jacks implanted in the temples. The only VISOR seen on screen was used by Geordi La Forge, who was blind from birth. VISOR is an acronym for "Visual Instrument and Sight Organ Replacement"; however, the complete term never appeared in the series, but only in novelizations and other written tie-in products.

The VISOR also caused LaForge some persistent pain, which could not be treated without interfering with the device. Beverly Crusher and Katherine Pulaski, the two high-ranking doctors who served on the ship, were unfamiliar with the device when first meeting La Forge.

The device does not reproduce normal human vision, but does allow the character to "see" energy phenomena visible to the naked human eye while expanding the wearer's full perceived spectrum to 1 Hz — 100 PHz. This also allowed the character to see human vital signs such as heart rate and temperature, giving him the ability to monitor moods and even detect lies in humans (but not aliens). In the episode "Heart of Glory", Captain Picard keys the main viewer to Geordi's visor allowing him to see the way he does. Seeing all the overlapping and different wavelengths was highly confusing to the Captain, prompting him to ask Geordi how he was able to differentiate between them all. Geordi's response made the comparison of a child hearing many different sounds at once and eventually being able to pick out what they needed; it is a learned talent.

In the episode "The Mind's Eye", the access to Geordi's brain through the interface makes him a target of Romulan brainwashing.

In the episode "Interface", Geordi uses an experimental interface to his VISOR. In an environment too dangerous for humans to be in, Geordi sees, hears, feels and acts through a robot.

Twice in the series, Geordi refused to be granted natural vision, first by Commander Riker, who had been given extraordinary amounts of power by Q, because it would have come at the cost of Riker's humanity, and later by Doctor Katherine Pulaski.

Sometime between 2371 and 2373, before the time of the film Star Trek: First Contact, Geordi's VISOR was replaced by cybernetic eyes, performing the same functions. Noncanonical material gives the in-universe reason for the change as an ultimatum given to La Forge by a Starfleet Admiral owing to the role of the VISOR in the destruction of the Enterprise-D. On film, they are depicted using a combination of cosmetic contact lenses and CGI.

There was a short time period in Star Trek: Insurrection where Geordi gained actual eyesight, due to the effects of fictional metaphasic radiation, in the atmosphere of the planet Ba'ku. However, the effects of the metaphasic radiation wore off after leaving the planet, and the cybernetic eyes were once again used in the film Star Trek: Nemesis.

=== Reality ===
New Scientist magazine reported on research as to whether a device similar to a VISOR can actually be created for blind or visually impaired people. Partial sight has been successfully restored to blind rats by installing an implant behind the retina.

Several types of visual prosthesis are in development or trials in humans, and one device has been approved for sale in the European market. As of 2006, 16 blind people worldwide have had sight partially restored in a procedure where electrodes implanted in their brains take impulses from a camera to allow patients to see lights and outlines of objects. There is a device developed by NASA called a Joint Optical Reflective Display, or JORDY, that is presumably named for Geordi La Forge.

On August 14, 2012, the Proceedings of the National Academy of Sciences published an article stating the encoding of image information by the retina into patterns of action potentials has been replicated successfully by a prosthetic device and scientists have successfully restored full vision to blind mice. Scientists were able to mimic this ocular response using glasses, and speculate that a similar pair of glasses may be available for human use within two years.

LeVar Burton, who played the character of Geordi La Forge, disliked the VISOR prop because it restricted his peripheral vision – albeit less than its prototypes – and the constant pressure of the prop's arms on his temples caused headaches. In commentary for Star Trek Generations, film writers Ronald D. Moore and Brannon Braga noted Burton also felt the prop limited him as an actor, as it denied him the use of his eyes in conveying emotion. The original prop was inspired by a one-piece women's hair clip brought to production by Michael Okuda during the initial conceptual development of the VISOR prop.

== Fictional character biography ==
In the series, Geordi was born blind and wears a VISOR, an arc-shaped prosthetic attached at the temples that provides him with vision. Interfacing directly with his brain, the device enables him to "see" much of the electromagnetic spectrum – radio waves, infrared, ultraviolet, and beyond, but not normal light perception, though it does allow Geordi to see the visible light section of the electromagnetic spectrum.

La Forge was born February 16, 2335, in Mogadishu, Somalia, of the African Confederation on Earth to Silva La Forge, a Starfleet command track officer and eventual Captain of the USS Hera (NCC-62006) and Edward M. La Forge, a Starfleet exozoologist. He has also mentioned having a sister, Arianna. La Forge stated that with two parents in Starfleet he was an "army brat", frequently moving homes depending on where his parents were stationed around Earth (or other planets), which mirrors Burton's own youth (he was born on an American base in Germany). He attended Zefram Cochrane High School and then Starfleet Academy from 2353 to 2357. In 2357, he was assigned as an ensign aboard the USS Victory under Captain Zimbata. After his first cruise, he was transferred to the USS Hood serving with then Lt. Commander William Riker for her 2361-64 cruise, during which he was promoted to lieutenant junior grade.

La Forge once impressed Captain Jean-Luc Picard by staying up all night to fix a shuttle craft that Picard mentioned had a superficial problem. Upon learning this, Picard decided he wanted Geordi on his next command which ended up being the USS Enterprise-D where Geordi was assigned to him as a helmsman. He and the android Data, the second officer aboard the Enterprise-D, quickly become friends. At the beginning of Season 2, he was promoted to Lieutenant and named Chief Engineer; in Season 3, he rose to Lieutenant Commander, a rank that he held for the duration of the series and movies.

In 2371 the Enterprise-D is destroyed in a battle with the Klingon Duras Sisters. The following year, Geordi is assigned to the new Sovereign-class starship Enterprise-E to take up his previous role as Chief Engineer. When the ship travels back in time to the 21st century, he works alongside Dr. Zefram Cochrane and helps him successfully launch Earth's first warp-capable vessel and achieve first contact with the Vulcans.

During the Ba'ku incident, La Forge began to experience pain in his eyes after sojourning on the planet. Doctor Beverly Crusher removes his ocular implants to discover that his optic nerves have regenerated and he has gained normal sight. This effect is caused by the healing properties of the Ba'ku ring system and, at the time, it is speculated that the effect will fade after La Forge leaves Ba'ku. This diagnosis proved correct; La Forge again wears the implants in Star Trek: Nemesis.

The operations-division Starfleet field jacket as worn by Burton in the third season of Star Trek: Picard

In the third season of the sequel series Star Trek: Picard, La Forge is revealed to have fathered two daughters, Alandra and Sidney, who have joined Starfleet by 2401. Like their father, Alandra has become an engineer while Sidney has become a pilot. Alandra serves alongside Geordi while Sidney serves aboard the USS Titan; he has become overprotective of them nonetheless. La Forge has become a Commodore and is the head curator of the Starfleet Museum, wherein he has been working on a secret project for twenty years. Picard, Crusher, their son Jack, and the Titan crew, on the run from a Changeling conspiracy in Starfleet, seek La Forge's help to try to clone the ship's signals, but La Forge points out that Starfleet has upgraded their ships to "talk" to each other. However, when his daughters and Jack steal a cloaking device from the Museum and install it on the Titan, La Forge reluctantly goes along with them, whereupon he is reunited with an altered form of Data, fighting with his "evil twin" Lore for control of their common android body. La Forge helps Data overcome Lore's dominance of the body, which allows Data to kill the main antagonist of the season. La Forge is reunited with the rest of the Enterprise crew; he helps Data and Crusher find the true nature of Picard's neurological disorder and loses his daughters to it, forcing La Forge to reveal his secret project: the full reconstruction of the Enterprise-D. Picard uses the Enterprise to infiltrate the antagonists' collaborators' base; La Forge assumes temporary command, letting Crusher destroy the base's power source with the Enterprise's torpedoes, eliminating the collaborators' threat once and for all, and oversees Picard's rescue. La Forge greets his daughters, who have been returned to normal, on the Titan over video; he is last seen playing poker with his Enterprise crewmates at the Ten Forward bar in Los Angeles, content with his life.

=== Alternate timelines ===
In one of the alternate universes experienced by Worf in the Season 7 episode "Parallels (Star Trek: The Next Generation)", Geordi is killed in a Cardassian attack on the Enterprise when Worf is suddenly confronted with unfamiliar tactical controls and cannot raise the shields in time. Geordi's VISOR is revealed to be the trigger of Worf's unplanned shifts through the timelines.

In the alternate timeline of The Next Generation series finale "All Good Things...", La Forge has, by 2395, married "Leah" and had three children (Alandra, Brett, and Sydney) with her. He left Starfleet and became a novelist. However, these events may never happen because of the divergence of the time line at the episode's end.

In the alternate 2390 future in Star Trek: Voyager's "Timeless", La Forge is a captain and the commanding officer of the USS Challenger, doing his best to stop Harry Kim and Chakotay from altering the time line. He had micro-implants in his eyes, allowing him to see without wearing his visor. However, Kim and Chakotay succeed in their mission, erasing the alternate time line. Despite trying his best to stop them, La Forge is sympathetic to their actions and even offers a full pardon if they stop. When they refuse, La Forge is forced to attack, but wishes them good luck and says that in their place, he would probably do the same. When the group's ship suffers a warp core breach and is going to explode, he offers to beam them aboard his ship so that they can survive, but they refuse and tell him to move off to a safe distance, which he does.

In the holographic alternate history depicted in "Future Imperfect", a fictitious La Forge had cloned eye implants and had no need of his VISOR.

During the non-canon events of the comic book mini-series Star Trek: Countdown (a prequel to the 2009 Star Trek film), Geordi (now a civilian) is reunited with Data and Picard during an effort to stop a massive supernova that threatens all of existence. Geordi ultimately designs the Jellyfish, the advanced spacecraft that is piloted by Ambassador Spock in the film.

== Reception ==
Critics and fans have responded favorably to the character. Burton himself has complained on DVD featurettes about the lack of romantic interests for his character. At least one scholar, however, states that out of seven principal black characters across the Star Trek series, only La Forge and Tuvok "really qualify as nerds, and neither of them compares with the extraordinary geekiness of the teenaged Wesley Crusher." According to Dr. Ron Eglash, the construction of the La Forge character stands up to the standards of Afrofuturism.

In David Greven's book Gender and Sexuality in Star Trek (2009), he described the use of the VISOR as a means to obscure the face of the character, describing it as a "surprisingly clunky symbol of blindness". However, he felt that the bionic eyes used in the film series were an improvement but followed a pattern of African American eye modifications in fantasy and science fiction films such as Halle Berry as Storm in X-Men (2000). Greven suggested that these changes were to create the impression that the wearer was alien in nature and to highlight the difference between that character/actor and the others in the film.

In 2018, TheWrap ranked Geordi as the 11th best main cast character of Star Trek shows, noting his ability to come up with technical solutions on short notice and his friendship with Data. In 2016, the character of Geordi was ranked as the 21st most important character of Starfleet within the Star Trek science fiction universe by Wired magazine. In 2016, The Hollywood Reporter ranked "Relics" as the 62nd greatest of the Star Trek franchise up to that time, noting that LeVar Burton has many great scenes with original cast veteran James Doohan reprising his famous character Scotty.

In 2017, IndieWire rated Geordi as the 8th best character on Star Trek: The Next Generation. CBR ranked La Forge as the 13th best Starfleet character of Star Trek, in 2018.

In 2017, Screen Rant ranked La Forge the 9th most attractive person in the Star Trek universe. In 2018, The Wrap placed La Forge as 11th out 39 in a ranking of main cast characters of the Star Trek franchise prior to Star Trek: Discovery.

== See also ==
- Artificial eye
- Human echolocation
