= List of Star Trek: The Next Generation episodes =

Star Trek: The Next Generation is an American science fiction television series which aired in syndication from September 1987 through to May 1994. It is the second live-action series of the Star Trek franchise and comprises a total of 176 (DVD and original broadcast) or 178 (syndicated) episodes over 7 seasons. The series picks up about 95 years after the original series is said to have taken place. The television episodes are listed here in chronological order by original air date, which match the episode order in each season's DVD set.

The main cast consisted of Patrick Stewart as captain Jean-Luc Picard, Jonathan Frakes as his first officer William Riker, Brent Spiner as chief of operations Data, LeVar Burton as chief engineer Geordi La Forge, Marina Sirtis as counselor Deanna Troi, Michael Dorn as chief of security Worf, and Gates McFadden as Dr. Beverly Crusher. McFadden left the show after the first season and was replaced for the second season with Diana Muldaur as Dr. Katherine Pulaski, but returned for the third season and remained with the cast thereafter. Wil Wheaton starred as Wesley Crusher in seasons 1–4, returning for guest appearances in seasons 5 and 7. Denise Crosby played chief security officer Tasha Yar in the first season but her character was killed in the episode "Skin of Evil", returning for a guest appearance in season 3 and the two-hour series finale "All Good Things...".

The Next Generation cast also appears in four feature films: Generations, First Contact, Insurrection, and Nemesis.

== Series overview ==
Season	Episodes	Originally released	
Season	Episodes	First released	Last released
1	26	September 28, 1987	May 16, 1988
2	22	November 21, 1988	July 17, 1989
3	26	September 25, 1989	June 18, 1990
4	26	September 24, 1990	June 17, 1991
5	26	September 23, 1991	June 15, 1992
6	26	September 21, 1992	June 21, 1993
7	26	September 20, 1993	May 23, 1994

== Episodes ==
Both the series' premiere ("Encounter at Farpoint") and finale ("All Good Things...") originally aired as single two-hour presentations, but have since aired as two one-hour episodes.

=== Season 1 (1987–1988) ===
No. overall	No. in season	Title	Directed by	Written by	Original release date	Prod. code	Nielsen rating
1	1	"Encounter at Farpoint"	Corey Allen	D. C. Fontana & Gene Roddenberry	September 28, 1987	101; 102	15.7
2	2	"Encounter at Farpoint"	Corey Allen	D. C. Fontana & Gene Roddenberry	September 28, 1987	101; 102	15.7
3	3	"The Naked Now"	Paul Lynch	Story by : John D. F. Black and D. C. Fontana (Note: Credited as J. Michael Bingham); Teleplay by : D. C. Fontana	October 5, 1987	103	11.5
4	4	"Code of Honor"	Russ Mayberry	Katharyn Powers & Michael Baron	October 12, 1987	104	9.5
5	5	"The Last Outpost"	Richard Colla	Story by : Richard Krzmeien; Teleplay by : Herbert Wright	October 19, 1987	107	8.9
6	6	"Where No One Has Gone Before"	Rob Bowman	Diane Duane & Michael Reaves	October 26, 1987	106	10.5
7	7	"Lonely Among Us"	Cliff Bole	Story by : Michael Halperin; Teleplay by : D. C. Fontana	November 2, 1987	108	12.1
8	8	"Justice"	James L. Conway	Story by : John D. F. Black (Note: Credited as Ralph Wills) & Worley Thorne; Teleplay by : Worley Thorne	November 9, 1987	109	12.7
9	9	"The Battle"	Rob Bowman	Story by : Larry Forrester; Teleplay by : Herbert Wright	November 16, 1987	110	10.5
10	10	"Hide and Q"	Cliff Bole	Story by : Maurice Hurley (Note: Credited as C.J. Holland); Teleplay by : Maurice Hurley & Gene Roddenberry	November 23, 1987	111	11.0
11	11	"Haven"	Richard Compton	Story by : Tracy Tormé & Lan O'Kun; Teleplay by : Tracy Tormé	November 30, 1987	105	10.3
12	12	"The Big Goodbye"	Joseph L. Scanlan	Tracy Tormé	January 11, 1988	113	11.5
13	13	"Datalore"	Rob Bowman	Story by : Robert Lewin & Maurice Hurley; Teleplay by : Robert Lewin & Gene Roddenberry	January 18, 1988	114	10.3
14	14	"Angel One"	Michael Rhodes	Patrick Barry	January 25, 1988	115	11.4
15	15	"11001001"	Paul Lynch	Maurice Hurley & Robert Lewin	February 1, 1988	116	10.7
16	16	"Too Short a Season"	Rob Bowman	Story by : Michael Michaelian; Teleplay by : Michael Michaelian & D. C. Fontana	February 8, 1988	112	10.9
17	17	"When the Bough Breaks"	Kim Manners	Hannah Louise Shearer	February 15, 1988	118	10.2
18	18	"Home Soil"	Corey Allen	Story by : Karl Geurs & Ralph Sanchez and Robert Sabaroff; Teleplay by : Robert Sabaroff	February 22, 1988	117	9.0
19	19	"Coming of Age"	Mike Vejar	Sandy Fries	March 14, 1988	119	10.1
20	20	"Heart of Glory"	Rob Bowman	Story by : Maurice Hurley and Herbert Wright & D. C. Fontana; Teleplay by : Maurice Hurley	March 21, 1988	120	10.7
21	21	"The Arsenal of Freedom"	Les Landau	Story by : Maurice Hurley & Robert Lewin; Teleplay by : Richard Manning & Hans Beimler	April 11, 1988	121	10.4
22	22	"Symbiosis"	Win Phelps	Story by : Robert Lewin; Teleplay by : Robert Lewin and Richard Manning & Hans Beimler	April 18, 1988	123	10.8
23	23	"Skin of Evil"	Joseph L. Scanlan	Story by : Joseph Stefano; Teleplay by : Joseph Stefano & Hannah Louise Shearer	April 25, 1988	122	9.7
24	24	"We'll Always Have Paris"	Robert Becker	Deborah Dean Davis & Hannah Louise Shearer	May 2, 1988	124	9.7
25	25	"Conspiracy"	Cliff Bole	Story by : Robert Sabaroff; Teleplay by : Tracy Tormé	May 9, 1988	125	9.4
26	26	"The Neutral Zone"	James L. Conway	Story by : Deborah McIntyre & Mona Clee; Teleplay by : Maurice Hurley	May 16, 1988	126	10.2

=== Season 2 (1988–1989) ===
No. overall	No. in season	Title	Directed by	Written by	Original release date	Prod. code	Nielsen rating
27	1	"The Child"	Rob Bowman	Jaron Summers & Jon Povill and Maurice Hurley	November 21, 1988	127	10.9
28	2	"Where Silence Has Lease"	Winrich Kolbe	Jack B. Sowards	November 28, 1988	128	10.3
29	3	"Elementary, Dear Data"	Rob Bowman	Brian Alan Lane	December 5, 1988	129	Unknown
30	4	"The Outrageous Okona"	Robert Becker	Story by : Les Menchen & Lance Dickson and David Landsberg; Teleplay by : Burton Armus	December 12, 1988	130	Unknown
31	5	"Loud as a Whisper"	Larry Shaw	Jacqueline Zambrano	January 9, 1989	132	10.7
32	6	"The Schizoid Man"	Les Landau	Story by : Richard Manning & Hans Beimler; Teleplay by : Tracy Tormé	January 23, 1989	131	10.8
33	7	"Unnatural Selection"	Paul Lynch	John Mason & Mike Gray	January 30, 1989	133	11.0
34	8	"A Matter of Honor"	Rob Bowman	Story by : Wanda M. Haight & Gregory Amos and Burton Armus; Teleplay by : Burton Armus	February 6, 1989	134	11.3
35	9	"The Measure of a Man"	Robert Scheerer	Melinda M. Snodgrass	February 13, 1989	135	11.3
36	10	"The Dauphin"	Rob Bowman	Scott Rubenstein & Leonard Mlodinow	February 20, 1989	136	10.7
37	11	"Contagion"	Joseph L. Scanlan	Steve Gerber & Beth Woods	March 20, 1989	137	10.2
38	12	"The Royale"	Cliff Bole	Tracy Tormé (Note: Credited as Keith Mills)	March 27, 1989	138	10.6
39	13	"Time Squared"	Joseph L. Scanlan	Story by : Kurt Michael Bensmiller; Teleplay by : Maurice Hurley	April 3, 1989	139	9.9
40	14	"The Icarus Factor"	Robert Iscove	Story by : David Assael; Teleplay by : David Assael and Robert McCullough	April 24, 1989	140	9.1
41	15	"Pen Pals"	Winrich Kolbe	Story by : Hannah Louise Shearer; Teleplay by : Melinda M. Snodgrass	May 1, 1989	141	9.7
42	16	"Q Who"	Rob Bowman	Maurice Hurley	May 8, 1989	142	10.3
43	17	"Samaritan Snare"	Les Landau	Robert McCullough	May 15, 1989	143	10.0
44	18	"Up the Long Ladder"	Winrich Kolbe	Melinda M. Snodgrass	May 22, 1989	144	9.2
45	19	"Manhunt"	Rob Bowman	Tracy Tormé (Note: Credited as Terry Devereaux)	June 19, 1989	145	8.9
46	20	"The Emissary"	Cliff Bole	Story by : Richard Manning & Hans Beimler; Teleplay by : Richard Manning & Hans Beimler Based on an unpublished story by: Thomas H. Calder	June 26, 1989	146	9.0
47	21	"Peak Performance"	Robert Scheerer	David Kemper	July 10, 1989	147	9.4
48	22	"Shades of Gray"	Rob Bowman	Story by : Maurice Hurley; Teleplay by : Maurice Hurley and Richard Manning & Hans Beimler	July 17, 1989	148	9.8

=== Season 3 (1989–1990) ===
No. overall	No. in season	Title	Directed by	Written by	Original release date	Prod. code	Nielsen rating
49 (Note: "Evolution" and "The Ensigns of Command" were filmed in a different order to that in which they aired.)	1	"Evolution"	Winrich Kolbe	Story by : Michael Piller & Michael Wagner; Teleplay by : Michael Piller	September 25, 1989	150	10.8
50	2	"The Ensigns of Command"	Cliff Bole	Melinda M. Snodgrass	October 2, 1989	149	Unknown
51	3	"The Survivors"	Les Landau	Michael Wagner	October 9, 1989	151	9.6
52	4	"Who Watches the Watchers"	Robert Wiemer	Richard Manning & Hans Beimler	October 16, 1989	152	9.6
53	5	"The Bonding"	Winrich Kolbe	Ronald D. Moore	October 23, 1989	153	9.9
54	6	"Booby Trap"	Gabrielle Beaumont	Story by : Michael Wagner & Ron Roman; Teleplay by : Ron Roman and Michael Piller & Richard Danus	October 30, 1989	154	11.0
55	7	"The Enemy"	David Carson	David Kemper and Michael Piller	November 6, 1989	155	10.3
56	8	"The Price"	Robert Scheerer	Hannah Louise Shearer	November 13, 1989	156	10.6
57	9	"The Vengeance Factor"	Timothy Bond	Sam Rolfe	November 20, 1989	157	9.7
58	10	"The Defector"	Robert Scheerer	Ronald D. Moore	January 1, 1990	158	10.5
59	11	"The Hunted"	Cliff Bole	Robin Bernheim	January 10, 1990	159	10.6
60	12	"The High Ground"	Gabrielle Beaumont	Melinda M. Snodgrass	January 31, 1990	160	10.5
61	13	"Deja Q"	Les Landau	Richard Danus	February 5, 1990	161	11.3
62	14	"A Matter of Perspective"	Cliff Bole	Ed Zuckerman	February 12, 1990	162	10.8
63	15	"Yesterday's Enterprise"	David Carson	Teleplay by : Ira Steven Behr & Richard Manning & Hans Beimler & Ronald D. Moore; Story by : Trent Christopher Ganino & Eric A. Stillwell	February 19, 1990	163	11.9
64	16	"The Offspring"	Jonathan Frakes	René Echevarria	March 12, 1990	164	10.2
65	17	"Sins of the Father"	Les Landau	Story by : Drew Deighan; Teleplay by : Ronald D. Moore & W. Reed Moran	March 19, 1990	165	11.1
66	18	"Allegiance"	Winrich Kolbe	Richard Manning & Hans Beimler	March 26, 1990	166	10.2
67	19	"Captain's Holiday"	Chip Chalmers	Ira Steven Behr	April 2, 1990	167	11.7
68	20	"Tin Man"	Robert Scheerer	Dennis Bailey (Note: Credited as Dennis Putman Bailey) & David Bischoff	April 23, 1990	168	10.2
69	21	"Hollow Pursuits"	Cliff Bole	Sally Caves	April 30, 1990	169	9.8
70	22	"The Most Toys"	Timothy Bond	Shari Goodhartz	May 7, 1990	170	10.3
71	23	"Sarek"	Les Landau	Story by : Peter S. Beagle; Teleplay by : Peter S. Beagle	May 14, 1990	171	10.6
72	24	"Ménage à Troi"	Robert Legato	Fred Bronson & Susan Sackett	May 28, 1990	172	9.1
73	25	"Transfigurations"	Tom Benko	René Echevarria	June 4, 1990	173	10.2
74	26	"The Best of Both Worlds, Part I"	Cliff Bole	Michael Piller	June 18, 1990	174	10.1

=== Season 4 (1990–1991) ===
No. overall	No. in season	Title	Directed by	Written by	Original release date	Prod. code	Nielsen rating
75	1	"The Best of Both Worlds, Part II"	Cliff Bole	Michael Piller	September 24, 1990	175	12.3
76	2	"Family"	Les Landau	Ronald D. Moore	October 1, 1990	178	9.6
77	3	"Brothers"	Rob Bowman	Rick Berman	October 8, 1990	177	10.9
78	4	"Suddenly Human"	Gabrielle Beaumont	Story by : Ralph Phillips; Teleplay by : John Whelpley and Jeri Taylor	October 15, 1990	176	10.3
79	5	"Remember Me"	Cliff Bole	Lee Sheldon	October 22, 1990	179	11.4
80	6	"Legacy"	Robert Scheerer	Joe Menosky	October 29, 1990	180	12.0
81	7	"Reunion"	Jonathan Frakes	Story by : Drew Deighan and Thomas Perry & Jo Perry; Teleplay by : Thomas Perry & Jo Perry and Ronald D. Moore & Brannon Braga	November 5, 1990	181	12.2
82	8	"Future Imperfect"	Les Landau	J. Larry Carroll & David Bennett Carren	November 12, 1990	182	12.0
83	9	"Final Mission"	Corey Allen	Story by : Kacey Arnold-Ince; Teleplay by : Kacey Arnold-Ince & Jeri Taylor	November 19, 1990	183	11.5
84	10	"The Loss"	Chip Chalmers	Teleplay by : Hilary J. Bader and Allan J. Adler & Vanessa Greene; Story by : Hilary J. Bader	December 31, 1990	184	12.2
85	11	"Data's Day"	Robert Wiemer	Story by : Harold Apter; Teleplay by : Harold Apter and Ronald D. Moore	January 7, 1991	185	11.7
86	12	"The Wounded"	Chip Chalmers	Story by : Stuart Charno & Sara Charno and Cy Chermak; Teleplay by : Jeri Taylor	January 28, 1991	186	12.1
87	13	"Devil's Due"	Tom Benko	Story by : Philip LaZebnik & William Douglas Lansford; Teleplay by : Philip LaZebnik	February 4, 1991	187	13.0
88	14	"Clues"	Les Landau	Story by : Bruce D. Arthurs; Teleplay by : Bruce D. Arthurs and Joe Menosky	February 11, 1991	188	12.3
89	15	"First Contact"	Cliff Bole	Teleplay by : Dennis Bailey (Note: Credited as Dennis Russell Bailey) & David Bischoff and Joe Menosky & Ronald D. Moore and Michael Piller; Story by : Marc Scott Zicree	February 18, 1991	189	11.4
90	16	"Galaxy's Child"	Winrich Kolbe	Story by : Thomas Kartozian; Teleplay by : Maurice Hurley	March 11, 1991	190	11.7
91	17	"Night Terrors"	Les Landau	Story by : Shari Goodhartz; Teleplay by : Pamela Douglas & Jeri Taylor	March 18, 1991	191	11.2
92	18	"Identity Crisis"	Winrich Kolbe	Story by : Timothy DeHaas; Teleplay by : Brannon Braga	March 25, 1991	192	10.9
93	19	"The Nth Degree"	Robert Legato	Joe Menosky	April 1, 1991	193	11.0
94	20	"Qpid"	Cliff Bole	Story by : Randee Russell and Ira Steven Behr; Teleplay by : Ira Steven Behr	April 22, 1991	194	10.8
95	21	"The Drumhead"	Jonathan Frakes	Jeri Taylor	April 29, 1991	195	10.5
96	22	"Half a Life"	Les Landau	Story by : Ted Roberts and Peter Allan Fields; Teleplay by : Peter Allan Fields	May 6, 1991	196	Unknown
97	23	"The Host"	Marvin V. Rush	Michel Horvat	May 13, 1991	197	11.3
98	24	"The Mind's Eye"	David Livingston	Story by : Ken Schafer and René Echevarria; Teleplay by : René Echevarria	May 27, 1991	198	10.1
99	25	"In Theory"	Patrick Stewart	Joe Menosky & Ronald D. Moore	June 3, 1991	199	9.8
100	26	"Redemption, Part I"	Cliff Bole	Ronald D. Moore	June 17, 1991	200	10.9

=== Season 5 (1991–1992) ===
No. overall	No. in season	Title	Directed by	Written by	Original release date	Prod. code	Nielsen rating
101	1	"Redemption, Part II"	David Carson	Ronald D. Moore	September 23, 1991	201	Unknown
102	2	"Darmok"	Winrich Kolbe	Story by : Philip LaZebnik and Joe Menosky; Teleplay by : Joe Menosky	September 30, 1991	202	Unknown
103	3	"Ensign Ro"	Les Landau	Story by : Rick Berman & Michael Piller; Teleplay by : Michael Piller	October 7, 1991	203	11.6
104	4	"Silicon Avatar"	Cliff Bole	Story by : Lawrence V. Conley; Teleplay by : Jeri Taylor	October 14, 1991	204	12.0
105	5	"Disaster"	Gabrielle Beaumont	Story by : Ron Jarvis & Philip A. Scorza; Teleplay by : Ronald D. Moore	October 21, 1991	205	12.3
106	6	"The Game"	Corey Allen	Story by : Susan Sackett & Fred Bronson and Brannon Braga; Teleplay by : Brannon Braga	October 28, 1991	206	13.4
107	7	"Unification, Part I"	Les Landau	Story by : Rick Berman & Michael Piller; Teleplay by : Jeri Taylor	November 4, 1991	208	15.4
108	8	"Unification, Part II"	Cliff Bole	Story by : Rick Berman & Michael Piller; Teleplay by : Michael Piller	November 11, 1991	207	15.4
109	9	"A Matter of Time"	Paul Lynch	Rick Berman	November 18, 1991	209	13.9
110	10	"New Ground"	Robert Scheerer	Story by : Sara Charno & Stuart Charno; Teleplay by : Grant Rosenberg	December 30, 1991	210	11.9
111	11	"Hero Worship"	Patrick Stewart	Story by : Hilary J. Bader; Teleplay by : Joe Menosky	January 6, 1992	211	12.7
112	12	"Violations"	Robert Wiemer	Story by : Shari Goodhartz & T. Michael and Pamela Gray; Teleplay by : Pamela Gray & Jeri Taylor	January 27, 1992	212	12.1
113	13	"The Masterpiece Society"	Winrich Kolbe	Story by : James Kahn and Adam Belanoff; Teleplay by : Adam Belanoff and Michael Piller	February 3, 1992	213	12.0
114	14	"Conundrum"	Les Landau	Story by : Paul Schiffer; Teleplay by : Barry Schkolnick	February 10, 1992	214	12.2
115	15	"Power Play"	David Livingston	Story by : Paul Ruben and Maurice Hurley; Teleplay by : René Balcer and Herbert Wright & Brannon Braga	February 17, 1992	215	13.2
116	16	"Ethics"	Chip Chalmers	Story by : Sara Charno & Stuart Charno; Teleplay by : Ronald D. Moore	February 24, 1992	216	12.6
117	17	"The Outcast"	Robert Scheerer	Jeri Taylor	March 16, 1992	217	12.3
118	18	"Cause and Effect"	Jonathan Frakes	Brannon Braga	March 23, 1992	218	13.0
119	19	"The First Duty"	Paul Lynch	Ronald D. Moore & Naren Shankar	March 30, 1992	219	12.1
120	20	"Cost of Living"	Winrich Kolbe	Peter Allan Fields	April 20, 1992	220	11.7
121	21	"The Perfect Mate"	Cliff Bole	Story by : René Echevarria and Gary Perconte; Teleplay by : Gary Perconte and Michael Piller	April 27, 1992	221	10.8
122	22	"Imaginary Friend"	Gabrielle Beaumont	Story by : Jean Louise Matthias & Ronald Wilkerson and Richard Fliegel; Teleplay by : Edithe Swensen and Brannon Braga	May 4, 1992	222	12.1
123	23	"I, Borg"	Robert Lederman	René Echevarria	May 11, 1992	223	12.8
124	24	"The Next Phase"	David Carson	Ronald D. Moore	May 18, 1992	224	11.7
125	25	"The Inner Light"	Peter Lauritson	Story by : Morgan Gendel; Teleplay by : Morgan Gendel and Peter Allan Fields	June 1, 1992	225	11.1
126	26	"Time's Arrow, Part I"	Les Landau	Story by : Joe Menosky; Teleplay by : Joe Menosky & Michael Piller	June 15, 1992	226	11.8

=== Season 6 (1992–1993) ===
No. overall	No. in season	Title	Directed by	Written by	Original release date	Prod. code	Nielsen rating
127	1	"Time's Arrow, Part II"	Les Landau	Story by : Joe Menosky; Teleplay by : Jeri Taylor	September 21, 1992	227	13.8
128	2	"Realm of Fear"	Cliff Bole	Brannon Braga	September 28, 1992	228	13.2
129	3	"Man of the People"	Winrich Kolbe	Frank Abatemarco	October 5, 1992	229	13.2
130	4	"Relics"	Alexander Singer	Ronald D. Moore	October 12, 1992	230	13.9
131	5	"Schisms"	Robert Wiemer	Story by : Jean Louise Matthias & Ronald Wilkerson; Teleplay by : Brannon Braga	October 19, 1992	231	13.2
132	6	"True Q"	Robert Scheerer	René Echevarria	October 26, 1992	232	13.7
133	7	"Rascals"	Adam Nimoy	Story by : Ward Botsford & Diana Dru Botsford and Michael Piller; Teleplay by : Allison Hock	November 2, 1992	233	13.5
134	8	"A Fistful of Datas"	Patrick Stewart	Story by : Robert Hewitt Wolfe; Teleplay by : Robert Hewitt Wolfe and Brannon Braga	November 9, 1992	234	13.4
135	9	"The Quality of Life"	Jonathan Frakes	Naren Shankar	November 16, 1992	235	13.2
136	10	"Chain of Command"	Robert Scheerer	Story by : Frank Abatemarco; Teleplay by : Ronald D. Moore	December 14, 1992	236	10.2
137	11	"Chain of Command"	Les Landau	Frank Abatemarco	December 21, 1992	237	12.9
138	12	"Ship in a Bottle"	Alexander Singer	René Echevarria	January 25, 1993	238	11.3
139	13	"Aquiel"	Cliff Bole	Story by : Jeri Taylor; Teleplay by : Brannon Braga & Ronald D. Moore	February 1, 1993	239	14.1
140	14	"Face of the Enemy"	Gabrielle Beaumont	Story by : René Echevarria; Teleplay by : Naren Shankar	February 8, 1993	240	13.1
141	15	"Tapestry"	Les Landau	Ronald D. Moore	February 15, 1993	241	13.8
142	16	"Birthright"	Winrich Kolbe	Brannon Braga	February 22, 1993	242	13.2
143	17	"Birthright"	Dan Curry	René Echevarria	March 1, 1993	243	13.4
144	18	"Starship Mine"	Cliff Bole	Morgan Gendel	March 29, 1993	244	13.0
145	19	"Lessons"	Robert Wiemer	Ronald Wilkerson & Jean Louise Matthias	April 5, 1993	245	12.2
146	20	"The Chase"	Jonathan Frakes	Story by : Ronald D. Moore & Joe Menosky; Teleplay by : Joe Menosky	April 26, 1993	246	11.2
147	21	"Frame of Mind"	James L. Conway	Brannon Braga	May 3, 1993	247	11.4
148	22	"Suspicions"	Cliff Bole	Joe Menosky & Naren Shankar	May 10, 1993	248	11.3
149	23	"Rightful Heir"	Winrich Kolbe	Story by : James E. Brooks; Teleplay by : Ronald D. Moore	May 17, 1993	249	10.6
150	24	"Second Chances"	LeVar Burton	Story by : Michael A. Medlock; Teleplay by : René Echevarria	May 24, 1993	250	9.7
151	25	"Timescape"	Adam Nimoy	Brannon Braga	June 14, 1993	251	11.6
152	26	"Descent, Part I"	Alexander Singer	Story by : Jeri Taylor; Teleplay by : Ronald D. Moore	June 21, 1993	252	11.7

=== Season 7 (1993–1994) ===
No. overall	No. in season	Title	Directed by	Written by	Original release date	Prod. code	Nielsen rating
153	1	"Descent, Part II"	Alexander Singer	René Echevarria	September 20, 1993	253	13.0
154	2	"Liaisons"	Cliff Bole	Story by : Roger Eschbacher & Jaq Greenspon; Teleplay by : Jeanne Carrigan-Fauci & Lisa Rich	September 27, 1993	254	12.2
155	3	"Interface"	Robert Wiemer	Joe Menosky	October 4, 1993	255	11.7
156	4	"Gambit"	Peter Lauritson	Story by : Naren Shankar and Christopher Hatton; Teleplay by : Naren Shankar	October 11, 1993	256	11.9
157	5	"Gambit"	Alexander Singer	Story by : Naren Shankar; Teleplay by : Ronald D. Moore	October 18, 1993	257	12.0
158	6	"Phantasms"	Patrick Stewart	Brannon Braga	October 25, 1993	258	12.2
159	7	"Dark Page"	Les Landau	Hilary J. Bader	November 1, 1993	259	11.6
160	8	"Attached"	Jonathan Frakes	Nick Sagan (Note: Credited as Nicholas Sagan)	November 8, 1993	260	12.1
161	9	"Force of Nature"	Robert Lederman	Naren Shankar	November 15, 1993	261	11.9
162	10	"Inheritance"	Robert Scheerer	Story by : Dan Koeppel; Teleplay by : Dan Koeppel and René Echevarria	November 22, 1993	262	11.6
163	11	"Parallels"	Robert Wiemer	Brannon Braga	November 29, 1993	263	12.8
164	12	"The Pegasus"	LeVar Burton	Ronald D. Moore	January 10, 1994	264	11.9
165	13	"Homeward"	Alexander Singer	Story by : Spike Steingasser; Teleplay by : Naren Shankar	January 17, 1994	265	11.8
166	14	"Sub Rosa"	Jonathan Frakes	Story by : Jeri Taylor; Teleplay by : Brannon Braga	January 31, 1994	266	11.5
167	15	"Lower Decks"	Gabrielle Beaumont	Story by : Ronald Wilkerson & Jean Louise Matthias; Teleplay by : René Echevarria	February 7, 1994	267	11.9
168	16	"Thine Own Self"	Winrich Kolbe	Story by : Christopher Hatton; Teleplay by : Ronald D. Moore	February 14, 1994	268	11.4
169	17	"Masks"	Robert Wiemer	Joe Menosky	February 21, 1994	269	11.8
170	18	"Eye of the Beholder"	Cliff Bole	Story by : Brannon Braga; Teleplay by : René Echevarria	February 28, 1994	270	13.3
171	19	"Genesis"	Gates McFadden	Brannon Braga	March 21, 1994	271	11.3
172	20	"Journey's End"	Corey Allen	Ronald D. Moore	March 28, 1994	272	11.9
173	21	"Firstborn"	Jonathan West	Story by : Mark Kalbfeld; Teleplay by : René Echevarria	April 25, 1994	273	11.4
174	22	"Bloodlines"	Les Landau	Nick Sagan	May 2, 1994	274	11.3
175	23	"Emergence"	Cliff Bole	Story by : Brannon Braga; Teleplay by : Joe Menosky	May 9, 1994	275	11.3
176	24	"Preemptive Strike"	Patrick Stewart	Story by : Naren Shankar; Teleplay by : René Echevarria	May 16, 1994	276	11.8
177	25	"All Good Things..."	Winrich Kolbe	Ronald D. Moore & Brannon Braga	May 23, 1994	277	17.4
178	26	"All Good Things..."	Winrich Kolbe	Ronald D. Moore & Brannon Braga	May 23, 1994	277	17.4

== Home media ==
The series was released on VHS cassette tapes, usually with two episodes or a two-part episode on one tape. For some releases the credits of both shows on the tape were combined at the end rather than shown separately.

=== DVD and Blu-ray ===
Season	Episodes	DVD releases			Blu-ray releases	
Season	Episodes	Region 1	Region 2	Region 4	Region A	Region B
1	26	March 26, 2002	April 1, 2002	May 10, 2002	July 24, 2012	July 23, 2012
2	22	May 7, 2002	June 10, 2002	July 5, 2002	December 4, 2012	December 10, 2012
3	26	July 2, 2002	July 22, 2002	September 4, 2002	April 30, 2013	April 29, 2013
4	26	September 3, 2002	October 7, 2002	November 12, 2002	July 30, 2013	July 29, 2013
5	26	November 5, 2002	November 18, 2002	December 6, 2002	November 19, 2013	November 18, 2013
6	26	December 3, 2002	December 2, 2002	February 7, 2003	June 24, 2014	July 21, 2014
7	26	December 31, 2002	December 23, 2002	April 11, 2003	December 2, 2014	December 15, 2014
Complete series	178	October 2, 2007	June 6, 2011	August 6, 2009	June 14, 2016	December 15, 2014

Certain episodes of the series have also been released on eight "best of" collections.

The four Next Generation movies were released together on a Blu-ray set in 2009. They have subsequently been re-released individually.

Three episodes were released on region-free Blu-ray Disc in January 2012. The complete series was rescanned and rebuilt in 1080p high definition and 24 progressive frames per second to be available for Blu-ray releases, syndication on television, and distribution digitally. This was not a remaster, wherein a new master copy is struck from the same original cut negative as previous master copies, nor is a remaster possible because the show was edited on tape and no such original cut negatives exist. Instead, it was a completely new edit of the show remade from raw film clips, with many shots needing to be replaced due to being natively interlaced, the wrong frame rate (unlike DVD, Blu-ray cannot handle mixed frame rates), or otherwise not convertible to the new format.

Five "Fan Collective" DVD collections were released, each including episodes with a particular theme – Borg, Klingon, Q, Time Travel, and Captain's Log – from the first five live-action Star Trek series, including The Next Generation.

=== Streaming ===
The digital distribution of the remastered series has been through services such as iTunes and Amazon Video. Seasons 1 and 2 were released on the US, Canadian and UK iTunes stores in early 2013, in both high and standard definition. Seasons 3 and 4 were released on the US and Canadian iTunes stores in the second half of 2013, and on the UK store in March 2014 - again in both high and standard definition. In early 2014, the first four seasons were added to the Australian iTunes Store in both high and standard definition. Both high and standard definition versions of Season 5 were released digitally in the US via Amazon Video and iTunes in early May 2014, and later in the UK, Canadian and Australian iTunes stores. In December 2014, Season 6 was added in both high and standard definition to the US iTunes Store.

The complete series was added to the Netflix streaming service in the US in 2011. In 2015, the series was updated to the high-definition re-edited version of the show. Although the series was available to subscribers on Netflix, Hulu, and Amazon Prime for a number of years, after Paramount launched its own streaming service, it stopped renewing streaming rights to the Star Trek series, and by late 2025, The Next Generation was available for streaming only from Paramount+.

== See also ==
- Lists of Star Trek episodes

== Bibliography ==
- Nemecek, Larry (2003). Star Trek: The Next Generation Companion (3rd ed.). New York: Pocket Books. ISBN 0-7434-5798-6.
