= Time's Arrow (Star Trek: The Next Generation) =

26th episode of the fifth and 1st of the 6th season

- Star Trek: The Next Generation episodes
- Data ponders his mortality
- Episode nos.: Season 5 and 6 Episodes 26 and 1
- Directed by: Les Landau
- Story by: Joe Menosky
- Teleplay by: Joe Menosky (Part I); Michael Piller (Part I); Jeri Taylor (Part II)
- Production codes: 226 and 227
- Original air dates: June 15, 1992; September 21, 1992

Guest appearances
- Whoopi Goldberg - Guinan; Jerry Hardin - Samuel Clemens; Michael Aron - Jack London; Barry Kivel - Doorman; Ken Thorley - Seaman; Sheldon Peters Wolfchild - Joe Falling Hawk; Jack Murdock - Beggar; Marc Alaimo - Frederick La Rouque; Milt Tarver - Federation Scientist; Majel Barrett - Computer voice; Michael Hungerford - Roughneck; Pamela Kosh - Mrs. Carmichael; James Gleason - Apollinaire; Mary Stein - Devidian woman; William Boyett - San Francisco policeman; Alexander Enberg - Young reporter; Bill Cho Lee - Male patient

Episode chronology
← Previous "The Inner Light"	Next → "Realm of Fear"
- Star Trek: The Next Generation season 5

"Time’s Arrow" is the 26th episode of the fifth season and the first episode of the sixth season of the American science fiction television series Star Trek: The Next Generation. It comprises the 126th and 127th episodes of the series.

Set in the 24th century, the series follows the adventures of the Starfleet crew of the Federation starship Enterprise-D. In this episode, an engineering team finds evidence that aliens visited Earth in 19th century San Francisco: Data's severed head, buried five hundred years ago.

The second part of the episode was nominated for three Primetime Creative Arts Emmy Awards, winning the award for Outstanding Individual Achievement in Hairstyling for a Series.

== Plot ==
=== Part I ===
The Enterprise is recalled to Earth after evidence is found of aliens on the planet 500 years before. A cavern near Starfleet Headquarters in San Francisco contains 19th century relics and Commander Data's disembodied head. Investigation reveals cellular fossils native to the planet of Devidia II, indicating a race of shapeshifters visited Earth's past. The Enterprise travels to Devidia II, bringing Data's second head. A temporal disturbance is discovered on the planet. Though no life forms are visible, Deanna Troi senses the presence of suffering humans. The crew determine that the aliens are slightly out of phase with time. Data notes that his android body has a phase discriminator that would allow him to see the aliens. Captain Picard reluctantly allows him to join the away team. Inside a cavern, Data, in phase with the aliens, describes them. They are absorbing light strands from a device in the center of the cavern, otherwise appearing benign. When two aliens enter a time portal, Data is drawn in. He finds himself in 1893 San Francisco, California.

Needing money, Data wins a sizable amount in a poker game. He stays at a local hotel, befriending the bellhop (future author Jack London). Claiming to be a French inventor, Data enlists London to acquire 19th century supplies under the pretense of building an internal combustion engine. Data is actually creating a detector to locate the aliens. Data sees a photo of Enterprise bartender Guinan in a newspaper and goes to a reception being held at her home. Believing she also traveled from the future, Data approaches Guinan, who is conversing with Samuel Clemens (Mark Twain). Data is surprised when she fails to recognize him, which sparks Clemens' curiosity. While speaking privately, Data realizes Guinan is actually native to this time period and has yet to meet the 24th century Enterprise crew. Data privately explains his situation, unaware Clemens is eavesdropping. Clemens becomes determined to discover the truth about the two.

Meanwhile, in the 24th century, the Enterprise crew build a phase discriminator that allows them to see the aliens and go back in time to rescue Data. Guinan convinces Picard that he must join the pending away mission, warning they otherwise may never meet. The away team activates the phase discriminator and sees the aliens. The light strands are human life forces at the moment of death that the aliens consume. Picard, Will Riker, Geordi La Forge, Troi, and Dr. Beverly Crusher enter the time portal to try and stop the aliens.

=== Part II ===
Arriving in 1893 San Francisco, the away team searches for Data and investigates a cholera outbreak. Dr. Crusher believes the alien shapeshifters use the epidemic to mask their preying on humans to ingest their life-force. The team encounters two shapeshifters at a hospital. When confronted, the aliens escape, which alerts Data to their location and reunites him with the away team. They pursue the aliens to the cavern near San Francisco, followed by Guinan and Clemens. The aliens' cane-like device opens a time portal back to future Devidia II. While struggling over the device, Data's head is detached from his body. The away team follows one alien into the future, bringing Data's headless body and the cane. Clemens spontaneously follows the others to the 24th century, while Picard is left behind, tending an injured Guinan. The dying shapeshifter tells Picard that 19th century Earth would be in jeopardy if the aliens' 24th century world is attacked, due to amplifying the time-shift effect. To send a warning into the future, Picard places iron filings with a binary message into the static memory of Data's head.

In the 24th century, Geordi La Forge reattaches Data's 500-year-old head onto his body. Once conscious, Data discovers Picard's message, and he and Geordi engineer a solution: using photon torpedoes in phase with the alien habitat will negate the dangerous time-shift amplification. The portal-opening cane device will only allow one person to travel to the 19th century and exchange places with Picard. Clemens returns to his native time. Picard leaves Guinan in Clemens' care and requests he settle the away team's 19th century debts. Picard laments not having the opportunity to know Clemens better. The author says that who he is, is written into his books. Picard returns to the future and is transported safely aboard the Enterprise before it fires the time-phased torpedoes, destroying the alien habitat. Picard reunites with Guinan.

== Reception ==
=== Critical response ===
In September 1992, writing for the Deseret News, Scott D. Pierce – who, as the newspaper's television editor, had previewed the episode – told his readers that they would find the conclusion "fresh and intriguing".

In 2013, "Time's Arrow" received high recognition within the body of 725 episodes, over 30 seasons, of the then-aired six television series in the Star Trek franchise, when Slate's Matthew Yglesias counted it as one of the ten best overall episodes.

In 2016, marking the 50th anniversary of the first ever episode in the Star Trek franchise, "Time's Arrow" again received high recognition within the body of the then-aired 725 episodes of the franchise, with Empire ranking this the 32nd best Star Trek television episode, and Syfy Wire ranking it the ninth best involving time travel.

In 2017, Variety listed the two-part episode as the seventh best episode of Star Trek: The Next Generation.

In 2018, CBR ranked this the 20th best time travel themed episode within the body of 742 episodes (as of Star Trek: Short Treks' season 1 episode "Calypso"), over 32 seasons, of the then-aired eight television series in the franchise.

In 2019, Nerdist ranked Mark Twain (Samuel Clemens) as one of the top seven time travelers within the body of 768 episodes (as of Star Trek: Discovery's season 2 episode "The Red Angel"), over 33 seasons, in the franchise. They note that when he is taken to the future, he is glad there is no poverty, war, or prejudices.

In 2020, Syfy Wire noted in this episode the relationship between Picard and Data, in particular showing that Picard is reluctant to risk what they call his "robot bestie". They point out the episode begins with the shocking discovery of Data's head on Earth, which causes a certain concern among the crew that Data will die on ancient Earth somehow, leaving his severed head to be discovered in the 24th century.

=== Awards ===
The second part of the episode was nominated for three Primetime Creative Arts Emmy Awards, winning two:

Year	Award	Category	Nominee	Episode	Result	Ref(s)
1993	Creative Arts Emmy Award	Outstanding Individual Achievement in Costume Design for a Series	Robert Blackman	"Time's Arrow, Part II"	Won	
1993	Creative Arts Emmy Award	Outstanding Individual Achievement in Hairstyling for a Series	Joy Zapata, Candace Neal, Patricia Miller, Laura Connolly, Richard Sabre, Julia L. Walker, Josée Normand	"Time's Arrow, Part II"	Won	
1993	Creative Arts Emmy Award	Outstanding Individual Achievement in Sound Editing for a Series	Bill Wistrom, James Wolvington, Miguel Rivera, Masanobu 'Tomi' Tomita, Guy Tsujimoto, Jeff Gersh, Dan Yale, Gerry Sackman	"Time's Arrow, Part II"	Nominated	

=== Scientific response ===
In his book Time Travel (2013), David Wittenberg wrote favorably of the depiction of the logic of time travel in the episode, stating that it "is both cognizant and respectful of … physical theory, offering a time travel loop in which causal order is not upset … no strictly logical paradoxes ensue."

== Release ==
"Time's Arrow, Part I" and "Time's Arrow, Part II" was released on LaserDisc in the United Kingdom in November 1996. The PAL format optical disc had a runtime of 88 minutes using both sides of the disc, to include both Parts (CLV). The 12-inch optical disc retailed for £19.99 when it came out.

"Times Arrow, Part I" was released in the United States on November 5, 2002, as part of the season five DVD box set. The Blu-ray release for Part I in the United States was on November 18, 2013, followed by the United Kingdom the next day, November 19, 2013.

- Star Trek The Next Generation DVD set, volume 5, disc 7, selection 2.
- Star Trek The Next Generation DVD set, volume 6, disc 1, selection 1

== See also ==
- "Roswell That Ends Well"
- "The City on the Edge of Forever"
- "Little Green Men" (Star Trek: Deep Space Nine)
