= Redemption (Star Trek: The Next Generation) =

26th episode of the fourth season and 1st of the fifth

- Star Trek: The Next Generation episodes
- Episode nos.: Season 4 & 5 Episodes 26 & 1
- Directed by: Cliff Bole (Part I); David Carson (Part II)
- Written by: Ronald D. Moore
- Production codes: 200 & 201
- Original air dates: June 17, 1991; September 23, 1991

Guest appearances
- Robert O'Reilly – Gowron; Tony Todd – Kurn; Barbara March – Lursa; Gwynyth Walsh – B'Etor; Ben Slack – K'Tal; Nicholas Kepros – Movar; JD Cullum – Toral; Whoopi Goldberg – Guinan; Tom Ormeny – Klingon First Officer; Majel Barrett – Computer voice; Denise Crosby – Sela; Michael G. Hagerty – Larg; Fran Bennett – Shanthi; Colm Meaney – Miles O'Brien; Timothy Carhart – Christopher Hobson; Jordan Lund – Kulge; Stephen James Carver – Hegh'ta helmsman; Clifton Jones - Bortas helmsman (Part I), Keith Craig (Part II)

Episode chronology
| ← Previous "In Theory" | Next → "Darmok" |

"Redemption" is a two-part episode of the American science fiction television series Star Trek: The Next Generation. Parts I and II of "Redemption" comprise the 100th and 101st episodes of the series, also being the fourth season finale and the fifth season premiere.

Set in the 24th century, the series follows the adventures of the Starfleet crew of the Federation starship Enterprise-D.

== Plot ==
=== Part I ===
Captain Jean-Luc Picard (as K'mpec's chosen Arbiter of Succession) and the Enterprise-D are asked to attend the installation of Gowron as the Chancellor of the Klingon High Council. Gowron informs Picard that the House of Duras, led by Duras' sisters Lursa and B'Etor, will challenge Gowron's position and may lead to a Klingon civil war. Meanwhile, Worf requests a leave of absence to visit his brother, Kurn, who controls a small fleet of Birds of Prey, and to urge him to back Gowron, as, once installed as Chancellor, Gowron can reinstate their family's honor.

Interrupting the ceremony, the Duras sisters present their deceased brother's illegitimate son, Toral, who has the lineage to challenge Gowron. Picard is called on to determine Toral's candidacy. The Duras sisters try to influence Picard; he in turn remarks that if he finds for Toral, Gowron will soon be dead, but if he finds for Gowron, Toral will lead a call for a rebellion against Gowron. At the restart of the ceremony, relying on Klingon law, Picard comes to the conclusion that Toral lacks the experience to lead, and secures Gowron's candidacy. This, however, prompts a majority of the council members to abandon Gowron. Gowron returns to his ship to meet with Worf, who offers his brother's fleet's support in exchange for the return of his family name to honor. Gowron initially refuses, but they are attacked by two ships loyal to the House of Duras. Worf and the arrival of Kurn's fleet dispatch the attackers. Picard completes the rite and installs Gowron as Chancellor; Gowron restores Worf's family honor.

Gowron and the Enterprise crew learn that the Duras sisters are assembling a fleet to incite a civil war. As the Federation cannot get involved in internal affairs, Worf resigns his commission from Starfleet to assist Gowron and Kurn. As the Enterprise evacuates the area before fighting begins, Toral and the Duras sisters consider Picard a coward, but their Romulan ally, a woman bearing an uncanny resemblance to the late Tasha Yar, emerges from the shadows and warns them that Picard may return.

=== Part II ===
Picard is aware that while he cannot get involved in the Klingon civil war, the Romulans will likely see it as an opportunity to gain an advantage over the Federation. He assembles a fleet of ships to create a blockade between the Klingon and Romulan border. Many of the Enterprise crew are assigned temporary command of severely undermanned ships. Picard initially does not assign Lieutenant Commander Data command of a ship, but after Data questions him about the omission, he gives him the Sutherland. Picard arranges the fleet to form a detection network that should observe any cloaked ships that pass the blockade. Commander Sela, the Romulan resembling Yar, orders her scientists to find a way to disable the network, but also contacts the Enterprise. Sela reveals that she is the daughter of Tasha Yar, who returned to the past on the Enterprise-C 24 years earlier ("Yesterday's Enterprise"). Sela warns that if Starfleet does not break off the blockade in 20 hours, their fleet will be attacked.

Meanwhile, Worf is kidnapped by the Duras sisters, who attempt to seduce him to join their cause by marrying B'Etor. Worf declines, stating that honor would be subverted and that the Klingon Empire would quickly fall to Romulan control. Seeing the cause is defeated, Sela orders Worf to be turned over to the Romulan guard.

Picard urges Gowron to attack the Duras forces, who are running low on supplies; this will force the Romulans to enter the detection network and be caught by Starfleet. Gowron agrees, knowing that association with the Romulans will destroy the Duras family's support and end the civil war. The Duras sisters demand the Romulans bring supplies. Sela's scientists find they can disrupt part of the network by sending out an energy burst. Sela initiates the plan, selecting the Sutherland as the target. When the network destabilizes, Picard orders the fleet to retreat and reform the net, but Data observes that he can trace the source of the disruption. He orders the firing of torpedoes at specific coordinates, revealing Romulan ships. The convoy retreats, and the Duras sisters are forced to end the civil war. Worf breaks free in time to secure Toral, but the Duras sisters escape.

Gowron gives Worf the opportunity to kill Toral by Rite of Vengeance, but he declines to do so because Toral was just a puppet of his aunts. Sparing Toral's life, Worf asks Picard to be reinstated into Starfleet, to which Picard gladly agrees.

== Production ==
While the first part was being filmed, Ronald Reagan visited the set.

== Reception ==
CBR ranked "Redemption" (Parts I & II) as the 15th best multi-episode story of Star Trek. The Hollywood Reporter rated it the 36th best of all Star Trek prior to Star Trek: Discovery, including live-action and the animated series but not counting the movies.

Variety listed it as the seventh best episode of Star Trek: The Next Generation. The Hollywood Reporter ranked it among the top 25 episodes of Star Trek: The Next Generation. Den of Geek also included it as one of their 25 recommended watches for Star Trek: The Next Generation.

Characters

Popular Mechanics highlighted "Redemption, Part I" as one of the best Captain Picard episodes and as recommended viewing for audiences to prepare for a new television series based upon that character, Star Trek: Picard. They point out his advice to Worf and his nuanced approach to navigating the difficult politics of the Klingon homeworld Qo'noS. They also praised the characters Lursa and B'Etor as antagonists in the episode, and compared Picard's actions to the way he handled the character Maddox in "The Measure of a Man".

SyFy noted this episode for a moment in the relationship between Picard and Data, when Data asks for his own starship command. They noted this episode for featuring a Klingon civil war, Tasha Yar's half-Romulan daughter and Worf's resignation from Starfleet. They also rated Gowron as the seventh greatest Klingon of the Star Trek franchise. In particular they noted actor O'Reilly's powerful performance in scenes with the character as Chancellor of the Klingon empire. They rated Kurn (played by Tony Todd) as the tenth greatest Klingon of the Star Trek franchise. They noted his good chemistry with Worf (Michael Dorn) and "relishes every word" spoken.

Time rated Lursa and B'Etor (played by actresses Barbara March and Gwynyth Walsh) the ninth-best villain characters of the Star Trek franchise. Popular Mechanics also thought Lursa and B'Etor were particularly good.

== Releases ==
"Redemption" was remastered in 1080p HD and released as a stand-alone episode, and as part of Season 4 and 5 Blu-ray sets of Star Trek: The Next Generation HD in the 2010s.

"Redemption, Part I" was released in the United States on September 3, 2002, as part of the Star Trek: The Next Generation Season 4 DVD box set.

"Redemption" was also released on VHS cassette tape.

== See also ==
- "Reunion", the predecessor to "Redemption".
- "Yesterday's Enterprise" where Tasha Yar went back in time.

== Bibliography ==
- Star Trek The Next Generation DVD set, volume 4, disk 7, selection 2.
- Star Trek The Next Generation DVD set, volume 5, disk 1, selection 1.
