= Paul Schiffer =

Paul Schiffer is a native of Canton, Ohio. He is the host of the political talk show, The Schiffer Report.

Paul was a nationally syndicated conservative talk show host on the Radio America network, and more recently was broadcast on WERE (AM) 1300 AM and WHK 1220 AM in Cleveland, Ohio and WNPQ 95.9 FM in Canton, Ohio.

Paul was a candidate for U.S. Congress in Ohio's 16th congressional district in the 2008 Republican primary.
