= Force of Nature (Star Trek: The Next Generation) =

- Star Trek: The Next Generation episode
- Episode no.: Season 7 Episode 9
- Directed by: Robert Lederman
- Written by: Naren Shankar
- Production code: 261
- Original air date: November 15, 1993

Guest appearances
- Michael Corbett - Rabal; Margaret Reed - Serova; Lee Arenberg - Prak; Majel Barrett as Computer Voice

Episode chronology
← Previous "Attached"	Next → "Inheritance"
- Star Trek: The Next Generation season 7

"Force of Nature" is the 161st episode of the American science fiction television series Star Trek: The Next Generation. It is the ninth episode of the seventh season.

Set in the 24th century, the series follows the adventures of the Starfleet crew of the Federation starship Enterprise-D. In this episode, a pair of sibling scientists show that warp drive propulsion is harming the very fabric of space. A sub-plot involves Data attempting to train his pet cat, Spot.

== Plot ==
The Federation starship USS Enterprise is sent to the Hekaras Corridor, the only safe path through the sector, to investigate the disappearance of the medical ship USS Fleming. In the process they find a Ferengi ship, which is badly disabled. The Ferengi leader contends a Federation weapon disabled his ship.

The Enterprise crew learns that Hekaran brother and sister Rabal and Serova are responsible for sabotaging the ships by using ship-disabling mines disguised as signal buoys. These siblings contend that sustained warp drive is destroying the fabric of space near their homeworld, and will eventually destroy their planet. Data determines that the research has merit, but requires more study. Picard requests a more thorough investigation from the Federation Science Council.

However, Serova is not willing to wait for any more studies. In order to prove her theory, she causes a warp breach in her ship, killing herself in the process. A rift is formed, and the Fleming becomes trapped in the damaged space. The Enterprise crew manages to find a way to "coast" through the rift without using warp drive within it by initiating a short warp jump at maximum speed, then beams up the Fleming crew and escapes by "surfing" the disruption waves produced by the rift.

Later, the Federation Council issues a new directive limiting all Federation vessels to a speed of warp five except in extreme emergencies. In addition, they have informed every known species capable of warp travel of the newly discovered dangers of its use. Worf asserts that the Klingon Empire will agree to the limitations, but it is uncertain whether the Romulan Star Empire, Ferengi Alliance, and Cardassian Union will also follow suit.

== Production ==
The premise of the episode is loosely based on environmental concerns of the early 1990s, such as the measures taken to prevent Ozone layer depletion. Writers Naren Shankar and Brannon Braga discussed ideas for a Star Trek episode with an environmental watchdog group, and the result was "Force of Nature".

== Releases ==
"Force of Nature" has been released as part of TNG Season 7 collections on DVD and Blu-Ray formats. Season seven of TNG, which contains this episode was released on Blu-ray disc in January 2015.

== Reception ==
In a 2013 retrospective for Tor.com, author Keith R. A. DeCandido criticized the episode as poor, scoring it a 2/10 and calling it "a mess with no emotional core". He noted that the Hekarans were invented for this episode, meaning the viewers would have no existing familiarity with them or reason to care about their fate, and we never see their planet which is in danger; nor is the Fleming ever actually shown. The result is that all of the events take place via technobabble and on viewscreens, and he did not feel the result created any tension or danger. DeCandido also noted that the plotline wherein warp travel was causing "pollution" of some sort was rapidly abandoned; it was mentioned in passing in two other episodes of the 7th season of The Next Generation (and once merely to verify it was okay to break the new prohibition), but spin-off works and later Star Trek shows essentially totally ignore the ramifications of this episode.
