= Lessons (Star Trek: The Next Generation) =

- Star Trek: The Next Generation episode
- Director Robert Wiemer used tight camera angles such as these to allow musicians to play off screen in time with the actors.
- Episode no.: Season 6 Episode 19
- Directed by: Robert Wiemer
- Written by: Ron Wilkerson; Jean Louise Matthias
- Production code: 245
- Original air date: April 5, 1993

Guest appearance
- Wendy Hughes – Nella Daren

Episode chronology
← Previous "Starship Mine"	Next → "The Chase"
- Star Trek: The Next Generation season 6

"Lessons" is the 19th episode of the sixth season of the American science fiction television series Star Trek: The Next Generation and was originally aired in the United States on April 5, 1993, in broadcast syndication.

Set in the 24th century, the series follows the adventures of the Starfleet crew of the Federation starship Enterprise-D. In this episode, Captain Picard's (Patrick Stewart) shared love of music with Lt. Commander Nella Daren (Wendy Hughes) leads to romance, resulting in conflicting emotions on his part. After incorrectly believing that she has died, he realizes that he is incapable of carrying out a relationship with someone under his command.

The episode was directed by Robert Wiemer, the episode was written by Ron Wilkerson and Jean Louise Matthias, with some uncredited revisions by René Echevarria. Stand-ins were used to perform the pieces by Picard and Daren, which required the use of close-up camera angles by the director. The episode was received warmly by critics reviewing it after the end of the series, who praised the performances of Hughes and Stewart.

== Plot ==
Picard is curious when he finds that the stellar cartography department has shut down several systems on the Enterprise, and visits the section to discover what is going on. He meets the head of the department, Lt. Commander Nella Daren, who makes an impression on him. It is a meeting memorable enough to later discuss with Dr. Beverly Crusher (Gates McFadden). At a musical recital by Lt. Commander Data (Brent Spiner), Picard is surprised to see Daren again, playing the piano. The two discuss music, and later meet in Picard's quarters and participate in a duet. Daren plays a portable piano and Picard performs on his Ressikan flute.

The two begin to meet more often; including in a Jefferies tube, which Daren claims has the best acoustics on the ship. In this private setting, their attraction for one another is expressed in a kiss. The moment of intimacy is fleeting, however. When they enter a turbolift, and are joined by another crewmember, Picard resumes the professional demeanour of Captain. The Enterprise is diverted from its mission, when it is directed to investigate a report of firestorms at a Federation outpost. While in transit, Picard consults Counsellor Troi (Marina Sirtis) about pursuing a relationship with Daren. Picard then goes to Daren to apologize for and explain his sudden formality on the turbolift. He then recounts the experience shown in the episode "The Inner Light" in which he had a wife and family, became a grandfather, grew old, and learned to play the flute. The experience imparted to Picard a deep appreciation for music, and he is pleased to have someone to share it with.

Daren speaks to Commander Riker (Jonathan Frakes) requesting a transfer for another crew member to stellar cartography. Riker says he will consider the request. Afterwards, he speaks with Picard, explaining that Picard and Daren's relationship makes the decision complicated. After determining from Riker that Daren's request is not unusual or taking advantages, Picard assures Riker that he will support any decision he makes. Later at dinner, Picard relates to Daren his talk with Riker, saying that they need to be careful about anyone else misunderstanding their relationship.

The Enterprise arrives at the Federation outpost to find that firestorms are heading toward the facility. Daren suggests a means of deflecting the storms, but the equipment requires trained personnel on the ground to operate it. Daren is assigned to the surface team, along with a number of other crewmembers. The outpost is evacuated during the dangerous mission, leaving only the Enterprise away team on surface. The firestorms overwhelm the position that Daren's team occupies before they can be retrieved. Believing Daren to be dead, Picard sits contemplating his decision in his quarters. He then hears that survivors are being transported aboard, and heads to the transporter room. Daren is not among the initial group of survivors, but is later transported to the ship. Eight members of the team have died.

Afterwards, Picard and Daren discuss their relationship. They conclude that it cannot continue, as Picard could not bear to put her in further danger. They discuss giving up their Starfleet careers to be together. Daren knows that Picard, although still cherishing the family life he experienced as Kamin, has nonetheless chosen duty, career, and loneliness. They both know that Daren must transfer off the Enterprise. They kiss once more, and Daren makes Picard promise not to give up music.

== Production ==
Ron Wilkerson and Jean Louise Matthias received story credits for the episodes "Imaginary Friend" and "Schisms", but for each episode the writing of the teleplay from the initial story idea had been assigned to a staff writer due to time constraints. Co-executive producer Jeri Taylor then allowed the pair to write the teleplay for "Lessons", their first for Star Trek. René Echevarria did some minor uncredited re-writes to the final version of the script as staff-writer Brannon Braga wished to avoid working on "Lessons" after recently working on another love story related script for the episode "Aquiel". Writer and producer Michael Piller likened "Lessons" to the 1945 Noël Coward film Brief Encounter.

The production crew sought to give Picard a romantic peer and equal in Daren, and were pleased with the actors' performances. Director Robert Wiemer said that "we had really turned-on performances ... if we'd had only moderate performances it would have fallen flat". However, as neither Stewart nor Hughes could play their instruments, it required a number of camera techniques to be used in order to disguise the musicians playing just off screen. Husband and wife duo Natalie and Bryce Martin played the piano and tin whistle respectively to portray Daren and Picard's abilities. Bryce had played his instrument to represent Picard's Ressikan flute since it first appeared in "The Inner Light". However, while Stewart did the majority of his flute fingering, he was doubled in several scenes by Noel Webb and John Mayham. Webb also doubled for Brent Spiner early in the episode when Data was playing Frédéric Chopin's trio in G minor. A variety of pieces are played throughout the episode, including "Frère Jacques", Ludwig van Beethoven's Piano Sonata No. 14 and Johann Sebastian Bach's Third Brandenburg Concerto. The "Flute song" by Jay Chattaway, which originally appeared in "The Inner Light", reappears in this episode.

The firestorm itself was created by Dan Curry and Ronald B. Moore by pouring liquid nitrogen onto black velvet and then blowing it with an air hose. The effect was then enhanced by digital effects and was digitally inserted into the background of the exterior standing set (usually referred to by cast and crew as "planet hell"). "Lessons" was the first appearance of the stellar cartography on board the Enterprise, but the set would be completely replaced for its reappearance in the movie Star Trek Generations.

== Reception and home media ==
James Van Hise and Hal Schuster wrote in their 1995 book, The Complete Next Generation, that they thought the relationship between Picard and Daren was believable, and that the story itself was very effective. They thought that the loneliness Picard feels at the end of the episode was part of an ongoing story which would culminate in the subplot about Picard's loneliness in Star Trek Generations.

Several reviewers re-watched Star Trek: The Next Generation after the end of the series. Keith DeCandido watched the episode for Tor.com, and described the performance of Wendy Hughes as "magnificent" and "never not wonderful". However, he commented that whenever a double was not used to play the piano, it was obvious that Hughes wasn't playing. Overall, he appreciated the script and thought that the ending was not contrived; however, he would have preferred for the episodic structure of The Next Generation to have been changed a little to allow for the romance to be portrayed as a subplot over several episodes. He gave the episode a score of nine out of ten, saying "this is one of TNG's best romances and an absolute joy." DeCandido subsequently named "Lessons" as one of the best episodes of season six, which he said was the best season of the series.

Zack Handlen, who reviewed "Lessons" for The A.V. Club, thought that the episode works because of Patrick Stewart and that the episode was well-handled. He gave "Lessons" a score of B+, saying that he "wasn't hugely sold on Daren, but when Picard makes a special point of explaining the flute's significance to her, it helps solidify the connection between them."

In 2012, Forbes placed "Lessons" in an alternative top ten episodes from TNG.

The episode was first released on VHS cassette on August 4, 1998. The episode was later included on the Star Trek: The Next Generation season six DVD box set, released in the United States on December 3, 2002, and on Blu-ray on June 24, 2014.

== Science education ==
In 2010, Wired noted this episode of Star Trek as one that could be used to teach real-world science, especially astronomy. The real-world counterpart to the Star Trek stellar cartography can be called uranography.
