= Descent (Star Trek: The Next Generation) =

26th episode of the 6th and 1st of the 7th season

- Star Trek: The Next Generation episodes
- Episode nos.: Season 6 and 7 Episodes 26 and 1
- Directed by: Alexander Singer
- Written by: René Echevarria (Part II)
- Story by: Jeri Taylor (Part I)
- Teleplay by: Ronald D. Moore (Part I)
- Production codes: 252 and 253
- Original air dates: June 21, 1993; September 20, 1993

Guest appearances
- John Neville - Isaac Newton; Jim Norton - Albert Einstein; Natalija Nogulich - Adm. Alynna Nechayev; Brian Cousins - Crosis; Stephen Hawking - Himself; Richard Gilbert-Hill - Bosus; Stephen James Carver - Tayar; Jonathan Del Arco - Hugh; Alex Datcher - Ens. Taitt; James Horan as Lt. Barnaby; Benito Martinez - Salazar; Michael Reilly Burke - Goval

Episode chronology
← Previous "Timescape"	Next → "Liaisons"

"Descent" is the 26th episode of the sixth season and the first episode of the seventh season of the American science fiction television series Star Trek: The Next Generation, the 152nd and 153rd episodes overall.

Set in the 24th century, the series follows the adventures of the Starfleet crew of the Federation starship Enterprise-D. In this episode they once again encounter the Borg.

The episode, which was aired on television in 1993, features a guest appearance by astrophysicist Stephen Hawking. He appears in the show's opening on the holodeck in a card game with android Data, as a holographic version of himself.

== Plot ==
=== Part I ===
On the holodeck, Lt. Commander Data plays a game of poker with holographic representations of Sir Isaac Newton, Albert Einstein, and Stephen Hawking. Data explains to Newton that the game is an experiment for understanding "how three of history's greatest minds would interact" in such a setting. He suspends the program when a red alert is issued from the bridge.

The Enterprise responds to a distress call from a Starfleet outpost. Riker, Worf, Data and a security guard form an away team and they find the crew of the outpost dead. They are suddenly attacked by a group of Borg, who kill the "red shirt" security guard. Riker notices that, in contrast to previous encounters, the Borg are armed with energy weapons and refer to each other as individuals. Data experiences anger while fighting a Borg and breaks the Borg's neck. One Borg begins talking to himself about the nature of the away team members and appears to signal a withdrawal when he sees that Data is an android.

Meanwhile, in orbit, an unidentified ship fires on the Enterprise, which returns fire. The alien ship beams up the remaining Borg from the outpost and flees, with the Enterprise in pursuit. The Borg ship suddenly enters a vortex and disappears. On the planet surface, Riker asks Data what happened, but Data can only explain that he felt anger. The away team is beamed back on board and Admiral Nechayev arrives to take command of the situation. She reprimands Picard for not destroying the Borg when he had the chance ("I, Borg") and orders him to do so if another opportunity presents itself. Data continues to try to understand what caused his behavior on the outpost. He tries to experience emotion again through simulations of the event, but does not succeed.

The Borg ship reappears and attacks another outpost. The Enterprise is once again the nearest ship, which makes Picard suspicious, since there are now several Starfleet vessels patrolling the area. The Borg ship reenters the vortex and disappears when the Enterprise intercepts; the Enterprise is caught in its wake and follows. When the ships have exited the vortex the Borg attack the Enterprise, beaming drones on to the bridge. After a brief fire fight, one drone is killed and another wounded, but the distraction allows the Borg ship to escape. This, too, is unusual Borg behavior, since they had always reclaimed their drones, whether alive or dead.

The crew discover that the vortex takes them from one star system to another almost instantaneously. They do not know how it is activated, though, so they are unable to return to Federation space. Data is sent to speak with the captured Borg in an attempt to gather intelligence, but the drone manipulates Data into releasing him and they escape together in a shuttlecraft. Before the Enterprise can catch the shuttle it disappears into a conduit. The crew have learned how the conduits are activated and the Enterprise gives chase, tracking the shuttlecraft to a planet. An away team finds no trace of Data or the Borg, and something in the planet's atmosphere is blocking their sensors, so Picard decides to conduct a ground search utilising nearly the whole crew of the Enterprise. Only a skeleton crew now remain on board under the command of Dr. Crusher.

Searching the planet, Picard, Troi, a security officer and La Forge enter a building and are surrounded by noisy Borg. Their leader, appearing on a platform, resembles Data but Troi recognizes that it is Data's brother Lore. Data appears alongside Lore and announces that together they will destroy the Federation.

=== Part II ===
Lore has discovered a way to give Data emotions and has turned him against the Federation. Lore plans to lead the breakaway group of Borg to destroy all organic life, believing that Lore and Data are perfect life forms. Picard, Troi, and La Forge are taken captive. Lore orders La Forge's VISOR removed. La Forge tells Picard and Troi that the VISOR enabled him to see a carrier wave being beamed from Lore to Data and they surmise that this is the source of Data's emotions and Lore's control over him. In orbit, the Borg ship is detected and Dr. Crusher, acting as captain, orders the away teams to be beamed back aboard from the planet. There is not enough time to retrieve them all and 47 crew members remain on the planet. Riker orders Crusher to leave the area and come back only when it is safe, since the rogue Borg vessel has detected the Enterprise. Rather than leave the system, Crusher orders the crew to take the ship into the star. Using the technology developed by Ferengi scientist Dr. Reyga, they modify the shields to allow them to get closer to the star than the Borg can. They use the ship's phasers to trigger an eruption on the star's surface which destroys the Borg ship.

On the planet, Lore orders Data to perform an experiment on La Forge's brain – an irreversible procedure with a "60% chance" of being lethal. La Forge pleads with Data, who ignores him and continues setting up the process. In their prison cell, the away team constructs a device which they believe will reactivate Data's morality subroutines, hoping that he will question his unethical actions and Lore's intentions.

Riker and Worf encounter Hugh, who tells them that Lore is the leader of this Borg group. He says that at one time Lore's help was necessary after the Collective disconnected the group because of Hugh's individuality spreading, but that he has destroyed many Borg through brutal experimentation. Hugh's group are "rebel" Borg, attempting to remove Lore from power.

The away team manages to reactivate Data's ethical programming just as he is about to start the irreversible part of the experiment. La Forge pleads with Data, asking him to check his conscience. Data falters, claims that there are anomalies in the experiment and postpones it.

Lore begins to doubt Data's devotion and attempts to strengthen control by threatening to remove the emotions he has provided. Data appears to be subservient, but Lore remains suspicious, and orders Data to prove his loyalty by killing Picard. Data refuses, as the rebooting of his morality subroutines is complete. Two Borg seize Data and Lore is about to execute him, when Riker and Worf arrive, accompanied by Hugh and some of the rebel Borg. A battle commences and Lore flees, pursued by Data. In their ensuing confrontation, Lore attempts to talk Data into escaping with him. When Data is unswayed, Lore attacks Data, but Data shoots him with a phaser and then deactivates him.

In the aftermath, Hugh becomes leader of the Borg group and the Enterprise returns to Federation space. Data reports that Lore is to be disassembled permanently and that he intends to destroy the emotion chip, as it is "too dangerous", citing the harm he has inflicted under its influence. La Forge intervenes and advises him to keep the chip until he is ready.

== Production ==
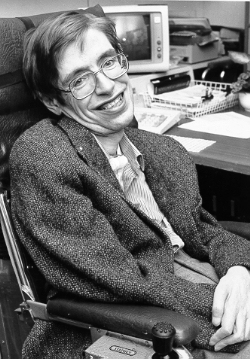
Stephen Hawking on a visit to NASA.

At a screening for the 1991 documentary film A Brief History of Time, which was based on the book of the same name by British theoretical physicist Stephen Hawking, Hawking was introduced to the audience by veteran Trek actor Leonard Nimoy. A Brief History executive producer Gordon Freedman told Nimoy that Hawking was an avid Star Trek fan. It was subsequently arranged for Hawking to visit the set of Star Trek: The Next Generation, which included an opportunity for him to sit in the captain's chair. Freedman told the show's executive producer, Rick Berman, that Hawking would appear on the show if asked. Hawking accepted the ensuing offer, marking the first time a guest star played himself on an episode of any Star Trek series. After he was sent the script, he made some modifications to it, including improving a humorous line of dialogue to make it funnier, which Berman called "delightful".

Later, when actor Brent Spiner, who appeared in the scene with Hawking, first read the script and saw that Hawking was a character in it, he imagined that he might be asked to play the scientist, as he had played multiple roles in episodes before. Spiner was excited, however, to learn that Hawking had agreed to play himself, leading Spiner to remark, "But I still think the guy cost me an Emmy". Filming of the scene drew a crowd of staff people, including some who were not working on the scene but pretended to have a work-related reason to be there according to screenwriter Ronald D. Moore. Between camera setups, Hawking was placed in a closet-sized room at his request, because such solitude allowed him to think without distractions. Berman related that of all the notable people he had met through the course of his career, including presidents and business magnates, the visitor who stood out above the rest was Hawking.

This episode is the only episode to have the episode title and opening credits listed during the cold open, before the title sequence. Normally, the episode title and all guest stars, producers/director are listed after the opening title sequence.

== Novel ==
A novelization of this episode was published by Pocket Books. It was one of five novelizations to be made of The Next Generation episodes, along with "Encounter at Farpoint", "Unification", "Relics", and "All Good Things...".

== Reception ==
In 2017, Den of Geek ranked Jonathan Del Arco as one of the top ten guest star roles on Star Trek: The Next Generation. He also appears in the role of Hugh in the episode "I, Borg", and reprised the role in the series Star Trek: Picard.

In 2019, ScreenRant recommended "Descent" as background on the character Data, for the series Star Trek: Picard, while in 2020, GameSpot made the same recommendation.

In 2020, Space.com recommended watching this episode as background for Star Trek: Picard.

In 2020, Cnet noted "Descent" for featuring the return of the characters Hugh and Lore, and described it as "fun" but not as good as "Best of Both Worlds".

In 2020, SyFy Wire recommended this episode for binge watching, noting how it explores Hugh, Data, and the Borg.

The Nerdist suggested this episode as the conclusion of a story arc of this TV show. They propose a story arc with the Enterprise 1701-D confronting the Borg, that would include "Q Who?", "The Best of Both Worlds", "I, Borg", and "Descent".

== Story arc continuity ==
As a season cliffhanger, Descent follows up on a number of threads opened in prior episodes:

- "Brothers", fourth season episode where Data's emotion chip is introduced, and Lore is left at large
- "I, Borg", the fifth-season episode where Hugh is first encountered.
- "Suspicions", the sixth-season episode where the metaphasic shields were first introduced.

Additionally, the emotion chip is followed up on in the 1994 film Star Trek Generations.

== Home video releases ==
"Descent, Part I" and "Descent, Part II" was released on LaserDisc in the United Kingdom in January 1996. The PAL format optical disc had a runtime of 88 minutes, including both Parts of episode using both sides of the disc (CLV). The 12 inch optical disc retailed for £19.99 GBP when it came out.

In the United States, the episodes were released in LaserDisc in two separate iterations, with Part I paired with "Timescape" and Part II paired with "Liaisons". The "Timescape" and "Descent, Part I" disc released in NTSC format on November 17, 1998. The "Descent, Part II" and "Liaisons" released in NTSC format on November 24, 1998. Both were 12 inch optical discs with both sides used for a total of 92 minutes runtime, and retailed for US$34.98, they were published by Paramount Home Video and made by Pioneer USA.

Descent was also released on VHS tape.

"Descent, Part I" was released as part of the Star Trek: The Next Generation season six DVD box set in the United States on December 3, 2002. A remastered HD version of "Descent Part I" was released on Blu-ray optical disc, on June 24, 2014.
