= Ship in a bottle (disambiguation) =

A ship in a bottle is a model ship that appears to be too large to fit through the mouth of a bottle in which it is contained.

Ship in a bottle may also refer to:

- "Ship in a Bottle" (song)
- "Ship in a Bottle" (Bagpuss)
- "Ship in a Bottle" (Star Trek: The Next Generation)
- Ship in a Bottle fuel tank
