= Star Trek: The Next Generation season 6 =

1992–93 season of American television series

Star Trek: The Next Generation
- Season 6
- Region A/1 Blu-ray cover art
- No. of episodes: 26

Release
- Original network: Broadcast syndication
- Original release: September 21, 1992 – June 21, 1993

Season chronology
- ← Previous; Season 5 Next → Season 7

The sixth season of the American science fiction television series Star Trek: The Next Generation commenced airing in broadcast syndication in the United States on September 21, 1992, and concluded on June 21, 1993, after airing 26 episodes. Set in the 24th century, the series follows the adventures of the crew of the Starfleet starship Enterprise-D.

The season begins with the successful rescue of Data from the nineteenth century, and we learn just how long Guinan has actually known Picard. ("Time's Arrow")

Picard is temporarily assigned away from the Enterprise for a dangerous espionage mission against the Cardassians, but is captured and subjected to torture, nearly succumbing before being released ("Chain of Command"). Deanna Troi engaged in a similarly risky mission of espionage against the Romulans ("Face of the Enemy").

Picard also underwent significant personal development during this season. He formed an intense and troubled romantic relationship with the Enterprise's head of stellar cartography, Nella Daren ("Lessons"). After his artificial heart is nearly destroyed, Q helps Picard experience a vision of the unremarkable life he could have led, giving him a better understanding of his mortality and his reasons for living ("Tapestry").

Riker also experiences a deeply personal conflict, making a gripping personal battle with his own sanity ("Frame of Mind"), and later discovers an accidental transporter-copy of himself that had been abandoned on a desolate planet for nearly a decade ("Second Chances").

Several well-known recurring characters make appearances this season, the most famous among them being Montgomery Scott. The Enterprise engineer from the Original Series is discovered alive, and after an awkward period adjusting to the twenty-fourth century, sets out to explore the galaxy on his own ("Relics"). The sentient hologram Professor Moriarty returns, holding the ship captive in a complex game that he hopes will grant him freedom to live outside the holodeck ("Ship in a Bottle"). Reginald Barclay continues to develop, overcoming his fear of transporters ("Realm of Fear"). Q, in addition to his appearance in Picard's counterfactual vision, returns earlier in the season ("True Q").

We are left with the rediscovery of Lore, leading a group of rogue Borg, who with the influence of an emotional stimulant for androids, successfully seduced Data to become a willing participant in his violent plans in the cliffhanger that ends the season ("Descent").

== Cast ==
- Patrick Stewart as Captain Jean-Luc Picard
- Jonathan Frakes as Commander William T. Riker
- Brent Spiner as Lt. Cmdr. Data
- Gates McFadden as Dr. (Cmdr.) Beverly Crusher
- LeVar Burton as Lt. Cmdr. Geordi La Forge
- Marina Sirtis as Counselor (Lt. Cmdr.) Deanna Troi
- Michael Dorn as Lt. Worf

== Recurring and guest characters ==
- Majel Barrett – Computer voice (12 episodes)
- Patti Yasutake – Ensign Alyssa Ogawa (3 episodes)
- Colm Meaney – Transporter Chief (CPO.) Miles O'Brien (2 episodes)
- Whoopi Goldberg – Guinan (3 episodes)
- John de Lancie – Q (2 episodes)
- Brian Bonsall – Alexander Rozhenko (2 episodes)
- Dwight Schultz – Lt. Reginald Barclay (2 episodes)
- Rosalind Chao – Keiko O'Brien (1 episode)
- Michelle Forbes – Ensign Ro Laren (1 episode)
- James Doohan – Captain Montgomery Scott (1 episode)
- Ken Thorley – Mot (1 episode)
- Hana Hatae – Molly O'Brien (1 episode)
- Daniel Davis – James Moriarty (1 episode)
- Siddig El Fadil – Dr. Julian Bashir (1 episode)
- Robert O'Reilly – Gowron (1 episode)

== Episodes ==
In the following table, episodes are listed by the order in which they aired.

No. overall	No. in season	Title	Directed by	Written by	Original release date	Prod. code	Nielsen rating
127	1	"Time's Arrow, Part II"	Les Landau	Story by : Joe Menosky; Teleplay by : Jeri Taylor	September 21, 1992	227	13.8
The Enterprise crew follow Data to San Francisco of the 1890s. The crew deals with Samuel Clemens and runs into Jack London while trying to find a way to prevent aliens from interfering with 19th century Earth. Guest star: Jerry Hardin as Samuel Clemens.
128	2	"Realm of Fear"	Cliff Bole	Brannon Braga	September 28, 1992	228	13.2
Barclay must overcome his fear of the transporter to solve a mystery.
129	3	"Man of the People"	Winrich Kolbe	Frank Abatemarco	October 5, 1992	229	13.2
A psychic ambassador uses Deanna's mind to influence the outcome of his mission, endangering her life in the process.
130	4	"Relics"	Alexander Singer	Ronald D. Moore	October 12, 1992	230	13.9
The Enterprise investigates a vessel that crashed on the surface of a Dyson sphere 75 years ago. A pattern is found in the transporter buffer that turns out to be Montgomery Scott. He is released from the buffer and later agrees to return to the vessel with Geordi to help restore the logs. They become the only hope when the Enterprise is pulled inside the sphere. Guest Star: James Doohan as Montgomery Scott
131	5	"Schisms"	Robert Wiemer	Story by : Jean Louise Matthias & Ronald Wilkerson; Teleplay by : Brannon Braga	October 19, 1992	231	13.2
Several members of the crew are abducted and experimented on while they sleep, including Riker, Worf, La Forge and Data, and become sleep deprived.
132	6	"True Q"	Robert Scheerer	René Echevarria	October 26, 1992	232	13.7
Q reveals a secret about a young woman from Kansas who is visiting the Enterprise. She is a Q, and so were her parents. Guest stars: Olivia d'Abo as Amanda Rogers, and John de Lancie as Q.
133	7	"Rascals"	Adam Nimoy	Story by : Ward Botsford & Diana Dru Botsford and Michael Piller; Teleplay by : Allison Hock	November 2, 1992	233	13.5
A transporter malfunction turns Picard, Keiko, Ro and Guinan into children who become the ship's only hope when they are left aboard while the adult crew are forced to perform dangerous labor by Ferengi pirates.
134	8	"A Fistful of Datas"	Patrick Stewart	Story by : Robert Hewitt Wolfe; Teleplay by : Robert Hewitt Wolfe and Brannon Braga	November 9, 1992	234	13.4
Data's mind is connected to the ship's computer, which creates unforeseen effects on the holodeck.
135	9	"The Quality of Life"	Jonathan Frakes	Naren Shankar	November 16, 1992	235	13.2
Data observes that mining tools have become sentient beings and fights for their preservation. Based upon material by L.J. Scott.
136	10	"Chain of Command"	Robert Scheerer	Story by : Frank Abatemarco; Teleplay by : Ronald D. Moore	December 14, 1992	236	10.2
137	11	"Chain of Command"	Les Landau	Frank Abatemarco	December 21, 1992	237	12.9
Part 1: Captain Jellico is assigned command of the Enterprise while Picard is sent on a covert mission into Cardassian territory. Guest star: Ronny Cox as Edward Jellico. Part 2: Picard, having been captured, is tortured by a sadistic Cardassian interrogator (played by David Warner).
138	12	"Ship in a Bottle"	Alexander Singer	René Echevarria	January 25, 1993	238	11.3
Barclay accidentally awakens Professor Moriarty on the holodeck who uses the powers at his disposal to coerce the crew into finding a way to allow him to leave the holodeck. Guest star: Daniel Davis as Professor Moriarty.
139	13	"Aquiel"	Cliff Bole	Story by : Jeri Taylor; Teleplay by : Brannon Braga & Ronald D. Moore	February 1, 1993	239	14.1
Geordi falls for an alien Starfleet officer who is suspected of murder. Guest star Renée Jones as Aquiel Uhnari.
140	14	"Face of the Enemy"	Gabrielle Beaumont	Story by : René Echevarria; Teleplay by : Naren Shankar	February 8, 1993	240	13.1
Deanna is involuntarily recruited to assist in the transport of Romulan defectors across the border.
141	15	"Tapestry"	Les Landau	Ronald D. Moore	February 15, 1993	241	13.8
An accident kills Picard. He finds an afterlife with Q analyzing his past choices.
142	16	"Birthright"	Winrich Kolbe	Brannon Braga	February 22, 1993	242	13.2
143	17	"Birthright"	Dan Curry	René Echevarria	March 1, 1993	243	13.4
Part 1: Worf is told on Deep Space Nine that his father is alive and is being held prisoner by the Romulans. Meanwhile an engineering experiment accidentally results in Data's first dream. Guest star: James Cromwell as Jaglom Shrek. Part 2: Worf, now a prisoner, tries to teach the Klingon refugees the ways of the warrior.
144	18	"Starship Mine"	Cliff Bole	Morgan Gendel	March 29, 1993	244	13.0
Thieves attempt to steal trilithium from the Enterprise during a Baryon sweep at the Remmler Array and Picard alone must thwart them.
145	19	"Lessons"	Robert Wiemer	Ronald Wilkerson & Jean Louise Matthias	April 5, 1993	245	12.2
Picard becomes involved with a woman who is serving on the Enterprise but he must send her into a dangerous mission.
146	20	"The Chase"	Jonathan Frakes	Story by : Ronald D. Moore & Joe Menosky; Teleplay by : Joe Menosky	April 26, 1993	246	11.2
Picard tries to solve an ancient genetic mystery uncovered by his archaeological mentor and faces stiff competition. Guest star: Norman Lloyd as Richard Galen.
147	21	"Frame of Mind"	James L. Conway	Brannon Braga	May 3, 1993	247	11.4
Riker finds himself prisoner in an alien mental institution that resembles scenes from Crusher's play.
148	22	"Suspicions"	Cliff Bole	Joe Menosky & Naren Shankar	May 10, 1993	248	11.3
Dr. Crusher risks her career to solve the murder of Ferengi scientist Dr. Reyga and vindicate his research.
149	23	"Rightful Heir"	Winrich Kolbe	Story by : James E. Brooks; Teleplay by : Ronald D. Moore	May 17, 1993	249	10.6
Worf experiences a crisis of faith and travels to a Klingon holy site where the mythic figure Kahless returns to lead the Klingon people.
150	24	"Second Chances"	LeVar Burton	Story by : Michael A. Medlock; Teleplay by : René Echevarria	May 24, 1993	250	9.7
Riker encounters a duplicate of himself, Thomas Riker, created by a transporter malfunction. Thomas vies for Deanna's affections.
151	25	"Timescape"	Adam Nimoy	Brannon Braga	June 14, 1993	251	11.6
The Enterprise is caught in temporal stasis and on the brink of destruction by a Romulan Warbird.
152	26	"Descent, Part I"	Alexander Singer	Story by : Jeri Taylor; Teleplay by : Ronald D. Moore	June 21, 1993	252	11.7
The crew encounter a group of Borg acting individually and Data briefly experiences emotions. Professor Stephen Hawking makes a guest appearance.

== Reception ==
In 2019, CBR rated Season 6 of Star Trek: The Next Generation as the fifth best season of all Star Trek seasons up to that time.
