= Second Chances (Star Trek: The Next Generation) =

- Star Trek: The Next Generation episode
- Episode no.: Season 6 Episode 24
- Directed by: LeVar Burton
- Story by: Michael A. Medlock
- Teleplay by: René Echevarria
- Cinematography by: Jonathan West
- Production code: 250
- Original air date: May 24, 1993

Guest appearance
- Mae Jemison - Lt. Palmer

Episode chronology
← Previous "Rightful Heir"	Next → "Timescape"
- Star Trek: The Next Generation season 6

"Second Chances" is the 150th episode of the American syndicated science fiction television series Star Trek: The Next Generation, the 24th episode of the sixth season. It was directed by series regular cast member LeVar Burton ("Geordi La Forge"). This episode has a cameo by Mae Carol Jemison, the first Black woman in space, who became the first astronaut to guest star in a Star Trek series.

Set in the 24th century, the series follows the adventures of the Starfleet crew of the Federation starship Enterprise-D. In this episode, Commander Riker comes face to face with an exact duplicate of himself, created years earlier by a transporter accident.

The episode aired in syndication on May 22, 1993.

== Plot ==
The Enterprise is sent to the inhospitable planet Nervala IV to retrieve data from a Federation research base that was abandoned eight years earlier due to the onset of a disruption field that prevented transporter use. Commander William Riker is chosen to lead the team, having been part of the rescue team that helped evacuate the base; Riker notes that during that mission he was the last person beamed out to the Potemkin, where he was serving.

Using a break in the disruption field, the away team beams down and discovers a man who looks exactly like Riker. He says that he is Riker and explains he has been living alone on the base for eight years ever since the Potemkin was unable to transport him back aboard and presumed him lost. He holds the rank of Lieutenant, Riker's rank before he was promoted as a result of this mission.

Returning to the Enterprise, Dr. Beverly Crusher determines that this person is truly a second Riker. Chief Engineer Geordi La Forge postulates that when Riker was beamed off the planet eight years ago, the Potemkin split the transporter beam to cut through the distortions, but one beam was reflected back to the base, so that Riker materialized in both places.

Cdr. Riker suggests that Lt. Riker join them on a second attempt to recover the data. At the base, their personality styles conflict, and the attempt ends in failure when Lt. Riker refuses to follow Cdr. Riker's orders. Lt. Cdr. Data postulates that the two men are resentful towards each other due to the loss of their sense of uniqueness. Lt. Worf suggests another reason: each one sees in the other something of himself he does not like.

While helping plan a third attempt to recover the data, Lt. Riker tries to learn about what he has missed. He attempts to rekindle his relationship with the ship's counselor Deanna Troi, with whom he was romantically involved eight years ago. She has come to accept that her relationship with Riker is no longer a romantic one, and is hesitant to take the second chance Lt. Riker offers. However, they enjoy their time together; and Lt. Riker suggests leaving the Enterprise together for a new posting. Troi tells him she will consider it.

For their third attempt to recover the data, Captain Picard selects Lt. Riker's plan over Cdr. Riker's, leaving Cdr. Riker further upset. The plan is successful, but as they are exiting, a walkway collapses, placing Lt. Riker in mortal danger. Rescuing him would also put Cdr. Riker in peril. Lt. Riker tells him not to risk it, but Cdr. Riker saves his double, and both return to the Enterprise.

The two Rikers reconcile their differences. Lt. Riker states that he has been given a new assignment on another ship. He plans to use his middle name "Thomas" to distinguish himself from William. As a parting gift, Cdr. Riker gives his double his treasured trombone, noting that it belongs equally to both of them. Troi tells Lt. Riker that she will be staying on the Enterprise, but she thanks him for the time they had.

== Production ==
Jonathan Frakes plays both his main cast character William Riker and also a transporter duplication of himself from several years earlier.

The initial pitch for this episode was almost rejected until writers decided to use it to flesh out the backstory on Riker's previous relationship with Deanna Troi.

The writers considered killing off the main Riker, and letting his alternate take over, and also considered killing off the alternate Riker. In the end they settled on letting both Rikers live.

This was the first episode of Star Trek to be directed by LeVar Burton and was Burton's directing debut. Burton went on to direct 28 episodes of Star Trek television in the following years, including Star Trek: Deep Space Nine, Star Trek: Voyager, and Star Trek: Enterprise.

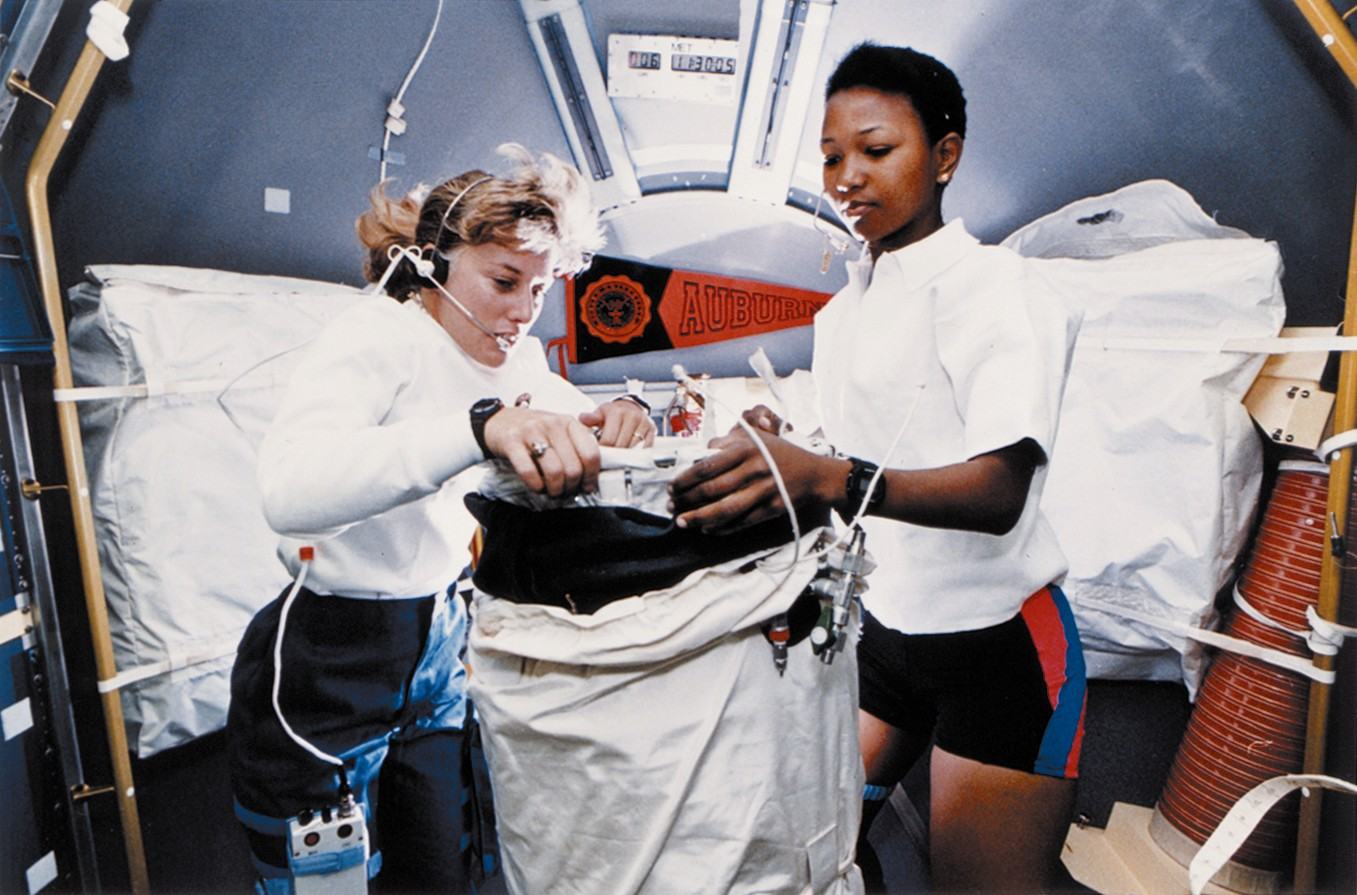
Mae Jemison (right) works in space with Jan Davis in 1992; in 1993 Jemison had a cameo in this episode of Star Trek

This episode features a cameo by the first African-American woman in space, Mae Carol Jemison, who was the first actual astronaut to appear on Star Trek. Nichelle Nichols (who played Nyota Uhura in The Original Series) was on set for the shoot. Jemison is a Star Trek fan and specifically cited Uhura as a role model for her and the reason she became an astronaut. She got the cameo after LeVar Burton learned that she was a fan and asked her if she would like to guest star in an episode, and she agreed.

== Reception ==
The A.V. Club reviewed this episode in 2011, and gave it a B+; they felt that Burton did a "fine job" directing and the same said for the acting.

== Legacy ==
Mae Jemison often gives talks and mentions her experiences with Star Trek to connect with audiences about careers in science and technology.

The events of this episode would be referenced in Star Trek: Deep Space Nine with the return of Thomas Riker in "Defiant" and in Star Trek: Lower Decks where main character Brad Boimler suffers the same duplication phenomena while serving on the USS Titan under Riker himself. In the penultimate episode of Lower Decks, Boimler's transporter clone William Boimler (who named himself after Riker) is informed that in an alternate universe, the events of this episode happened to Deanna Troi instead.

== Releases ==
The episode was released as part of the Star Trek: The Next Generation season six DVD box set in the United States on December 3, 2002. A remastered HD version was released on Blu-ray optical disc, on June 24, 2014.

On November 3, 1998 this episode and "Rightful Heir" were released together on LaserDisc in the United States for 34.98 USD. The episodes were on a single 12" double-sided optical disc with a Dolby Surround soundtrack.

== See also ==
- "Defiant", a Star Trek: Deep Space Nine episode which marks Thomas Riker's return.
- Teletransportation paradox
