= Face of the Enemy (Star Trek: The Next Generation) =

- Star Trek: The Next Generation episode
- Episode no.: Season 6 Episode 14
- Directed by: Gabrielle Beaumont
- Story by: René Echevarria
- Teleplay by: Naren Shankar
- Production code: 240
- Original air date: February 8, 1993

Guest appearances
- Scott MacDonald – N'Vek; Carolyn Seymour – Toreth; Barry Lynch – Stefan DeSeve; Robertson Dean – Romulan Pilot; Dennis Cockrum – Corvallen Freighter Captain; Pamela Winslow as McKnight

Episode chronology
← Previous "Aquiel"	Next → "Tapestry"
- Star Trek: The Next Generation season 6

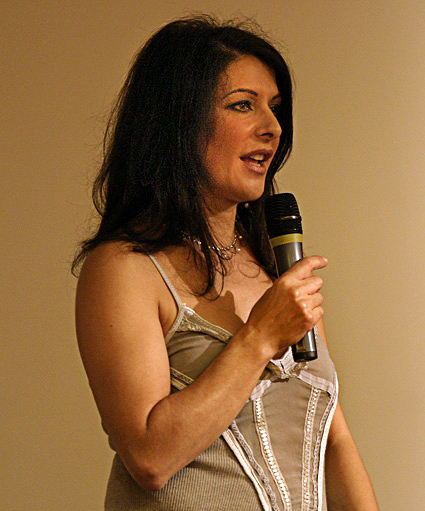
Marina Sirtis is cast as Deanna Troi, a half-Betazoid Starfleet officer that must use her telepathic abilities and wits to survive as an undercover operative on a Romulan Warbird.

"Face of the Enemy" is the 140th episode of the American science fiction television series Star Trek: The Next Generation, and the 14th episode of the sixth season.

Set in the 24th century, the series follows the adventures of the Starfleet crew of the USS Enterprise-D. In this episode, Troi is captured and forced to masquerade as a Romulan intelligence officer to help several high-ranking Romulan defectors.

== Plot ==
Deanna Troi is kidnapped and brought aboard the Romulan Warbird Khazara. After waking up, Troi looks in a mirror and is horrified to find that she's undergone cosmetic surgery to make her look like a Romulan. Subcommander N'Vek, the Khazara first officer, privately explains that he has no intention of harming her, but needs her to pose as Major Rakal of the Tal Shiar, the Romulan intelligence service and secret police. N'Vek has secret cargo meant for the Federation, and needs Troi to act her role to convince the Khazara commander, Toreth (who is not aware of N'Vek's plan) into complying. Troi, as Rakal, is able to sway Toreth to head for a planned rendezvous in the Kaleb sector under threat of intense interrogation techniques.

Aboard the Enterprise, the crew brings aboard Stefan DeSeve, a human who had served as an ensign in Starfleet before defecting to the Romulans. Now he has returned with a message from Ambassador Spock. Captain Picard, wary of his prisoner's motives, considers Spock's message regarding a meeting in the Kaleb sector that would be prudent for the Federation's interest, and directs the ship there.

As the Khazara is en route, N'Vek shows Troi the secret cargo - Vice Proconsul M'Ret and two of his aides, held in stasis. They wish to defect to the Federation, and his presence there would aid further Romulan dissidents to flee the Empire. The plan is to transport the stasis chambers to a Corvallen cargo ship at the rendezvous point, who will subsequently deliver them into Federation space. When the Khazara meets up with the cargo ship, Troi senses its captain is not trustworthy, and N'Vek fires upon it, destroying it. He claims he was ordered by Major Rakal. Troi later explains to Toreth that she recognized the captain of the cargo ship as a known Federation spy. N'Vek, in private, explains to Troi that their only other option is to travel to Draken IV, an entry point for the Federation, where Troi can use her Starfleet codes to allow the ship to enter undetected. Troi gives this order to Toreth, who reluctantly agrees to it. However, their conversation is interrupted by the arrival of the Enterprise.

The Enterprise arrives at the designated time and coordinates, but finds no trace of the cargo ship. They start a search, soon finding the wreckage of the vessel. As the Enterprise moves in, Toreth takes this as a sign of Troi's truthfulness. Troi wants to hold position, but the commander points out that with the wreckage nearby, they will be detected, and has the ship travel some distance away while the Enterprise continues to search. Troi is worried that the Enterprise will not be able to follow them, and has N'Vek create a trail of the cloaked ship.

Toreth learns of the Enterprise trailing them, and suspects that they've been detected. She orders a collision course for the vessel in order to test their reaction. When the Enterprise moves to avoid collision, Toreth orders the ship to decloak and attack. Troi steps in as Rakal and takes command from Toreth, then orders the ship to decloak and hails the Enterprise, offering to discuss the matter. The Enterprise crew, though they recognize Troi, feign ignorance and take down their shields. N'Vek fires on the Enterprise with low-powered weapons, appearing to damage the vessel but in reality as a means to mask the transport of the stasis chambers to the Enterprise. Toreth, realizing that she is being deceived, executes N'Vek and retakes control of the Khazara. Before the Romulans can leave with Troi as their prisoner, Troi is safely transported to the Enterprise. In sickbay, Troi's cosmetic surgery is reversed, and she contemplates the value of N'Vek's efforts to aid the Federation.

== Reception ==
Jamahl Epsicokhan wrote in an analysis for Jammer's Reviews: "The episode culminates with some tactical cat-and-mouse games between the cloaked warbird, the Enterprise, and undercover Troi, doing her best to help get the dissidents transported to the Enterprise. This is well done but not riveting. I should also point out that Marina Sirtis, game as she is here, is not all that convincing when she raises her voice in authority. But "Face of the Enemy" takes a good high-concept premise and milks it for what it's worth and then some."

In 2012, Tor.com's Keith DeCandido gave the episode a rating of eight out of ten, writing: "What I especially admire about this episode is the way that DeSeve’s internal conflict mirrors that of the episode. He refers to a moral certainty that was appealing to him as a youth, but as he grew older he realized that it was far more complicated than that."

In 2017, Business Insider listed this episode as one of the most underrated episodes of the Star Trek franchise.

In 2020, Tom's Guide listed this having some of the best moments for Enterprise D counselor Deanna Troi.

In 2020, The Digital Fix said this was the tenth best episode of Star Trek: The Next Generation.

In 2020, Brian Silliman writing for SyFy was very positive about Sirtis's performance in this episode, noting that this was an episode that put Deanna Troi in the spotlight and was an excellent episode.

== Releases ==
The episode was released as part of the Star Trek: The Next Generation season six DVD box set in the United States on December 3, 2002. A remastered HD version was released on Blu-ray optical disc, on June 24, 2014.
