= Amanda Rogers =

Amanda Rogers may refer to:

- Amanda Rogers, a Star Trek: The Next Generation character from the episode "True Q"
- Amanda Lee Rogers, birth name of actress Portia de Rossi
