= Star Trek 4 (unproduced film) =

Logo for the Star Trek reboot films

Star Trek 4 was the working title of an unproduced American science fiction film in development at Paramount Pictures based on the television series Star Trek by Gene Roddenberry. It was intended to be part of the Star Trek film franchise and was originally announced as the fourth installment of the franchise's reboot films following Star Trek Beyond (2016). There were several iterations of the film in development with different filmmakers between 2015 and 2025, alongside alternate attempts to continue the film franchise.

Development of a direct sequel to Beyond was revealed before the release of that film, with J. D. Payne and Patrick McKay writing. In December 2017, Quentin Tarantino pitched his own idea for a new Star Trek film to producer J. J. Abrams. Development began separately from the Beyond sequel, but the film did not move forward when Tarantino decided not to direct it. S. J. Clarkson was hired to direct the Beyond sequel in April 2018, but it was canceled when stars Chris Pine and Chris Hemsworth exited. Noah Hawley was hired in November 2019 to write and direct a Star Trek film that would take the franchise in a new direction. It entered pre-production, but this was placed on hold by new Paramount executives who reassessed the franchise and chose not to continue with Hawley's version.

Kalinda Vazquez was writing a new film in March 2021. Matt Shakman was hired in July to direct another version, written by Lindsey Beer and Geneva Robertson-Dworet. Josh Friedman and Cameron Squires also contributed to the script. Pre-production for this version was placed on hold when Shakman left to direct The Fantastic Four: First Steps (2025) instead. By 2024, Paramount was developing multiple Star Trek films, including Star Trek 4—with a new script by Steve Yockey—and a franchise "origin story" film to be directed by Toby Haynes and written by Seth Grahame-Smith. Star Trek 4 was described as the "final chapter" of the main reboot film series. Work on both films stalled amid the merger of Skydance Media and Paramount Global, which led to Star Trek 4 being canceled. In November 2025, Jonathan Goldstein and John Francis Daley were hired to make a new film.

== Background ==
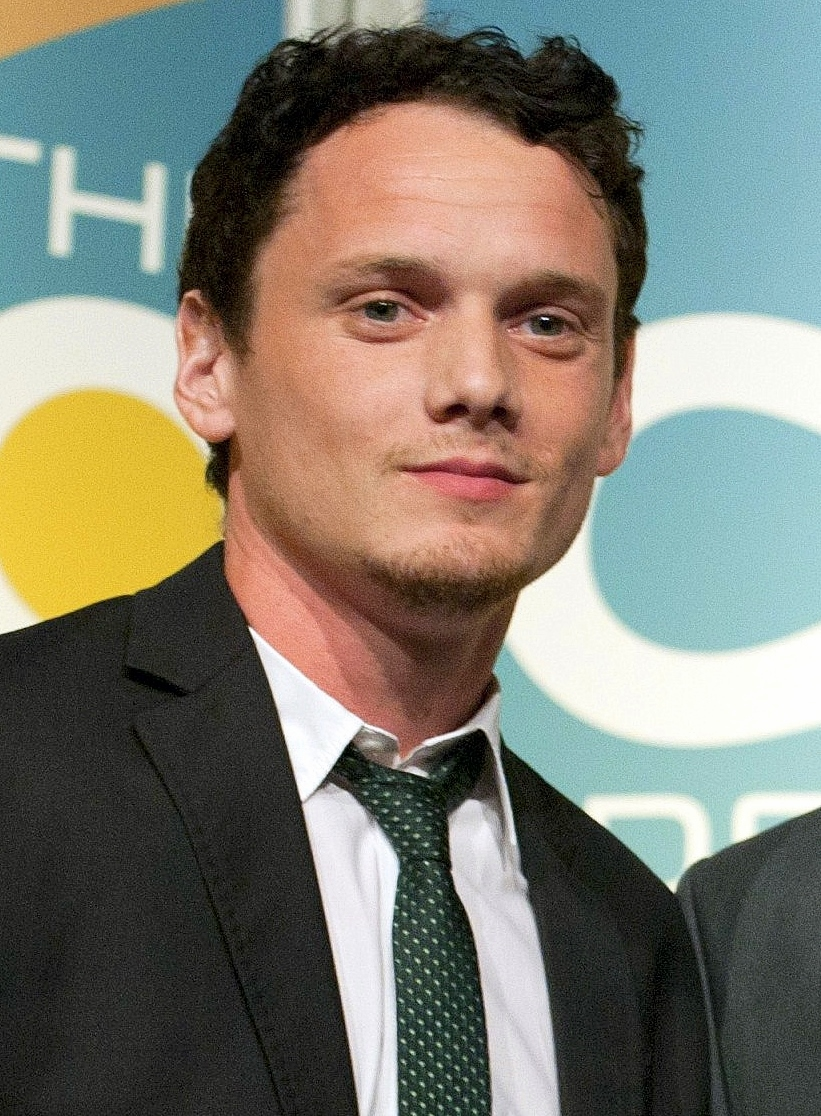
Franchise co-star Anton Yelchin died in June 2016, one month before the premiere of Star Trek Beyond.

Shortly before production began on Star Trek Beyond—the third of the Star Trek franchise's reboot films after Star Trek (2009) and Star Trek Into Darkness (2013)—in June 2015, Paramount Pictures completed last-minute contract re-negotiations with the main cast members of the reboot films. This gave the actors pay raises while signing Chris Pine and Zachary Quinto to return for a fourth film in their respective roles as James T. Kirk and Spock. That November, CBS announced the first new Star Trek television series since Star Trek: Enterprise (2001–2005), from executive producer Alex Kurtzman who co-wrote the first two reboot films. Titled Star Trek: Discovery (2017–2024), the series was set in the franchise's original "Prime Timeline" to keep it separate from the "Kelvin Timeline" of the reboot films. It led to Kurtzman signing a deal with CBS to expand the franchise beyond Discovery to several new series, miniseries, and animated series.

While promoting Beyond on July 15, 2016, producer J. J. Abrams said the fourth film would co-star Chris Hemsworth, reprising his role as James Kirk's father George from the first reboot film's prologue. Abrams added that the role of Pavel Chekov would not be recast following the death of actor Anton Yelchin a month earlier. On July 18, Paramount Pictures officially announced the next film with the temporary title Star Trek 4 and confirmed the return of Hemsworth, Pine, and most of Beyond's cast. J. D. Payne and Patrick McKay were hired to write the film after doing uncredited writing work on Beyond. Bad Robot's Abrams and Lindsey Weber returned as producers, with David Ellison and Dana Goldberg of Skydance Media as executive producers.

While making a guest appearance on The Nerdist Podcast in December 2015, filmmaker Quentin Tarantino expressed interest in making a Star Trek film. He said he was a fan of Star Trek: The Original Series (1966–1969) and Abrams's 2009 reboot film, and felt many classic Star Trek episodes could easily be expanded into a feature film; he gave the Star Trek: The Next Generation (1987–1994) episode "Yesterday's Enterprise" (1990) as an example. In September 2017, after a clip of this discussion resurfaced on YouTube, Tarantino was asked about directing a Star Trek film and said "it would be worth having a meeting about". He noted that he planned to retire after directing ten films and had already made eight. Pine and Quinto separately stated earlier in 2017 that they had not heard any updates about a new Star Trek film other than it was being written. Karl Urban, who portrays Leonard McCoy in the reboot films, reiterated this in September and expressed interest in having the fourth film introduce McCoy's ex-wife and daughter. That December, Tarantino approached Abrams and Paramount about an idea he had for a new Star Trek film and development on the project began at the studio. At CinemaCon in April 2018, Paramount CEO Jim Gianopulos said the Beyond sequel and Tarantino's proposed film were both in development.

In August 2019, Paramount's parent company Viacom announced that it was merging with CBS after the two companies split in 2006, bringing the film and television sides of the Star Trek franchise under the control of one company, ViacomCBS, for the first time since the split. This led to speculation about what impacts the merger would have on the ongoing development of new feature films and television series for the franchise.

== Quentin Tarantino ==
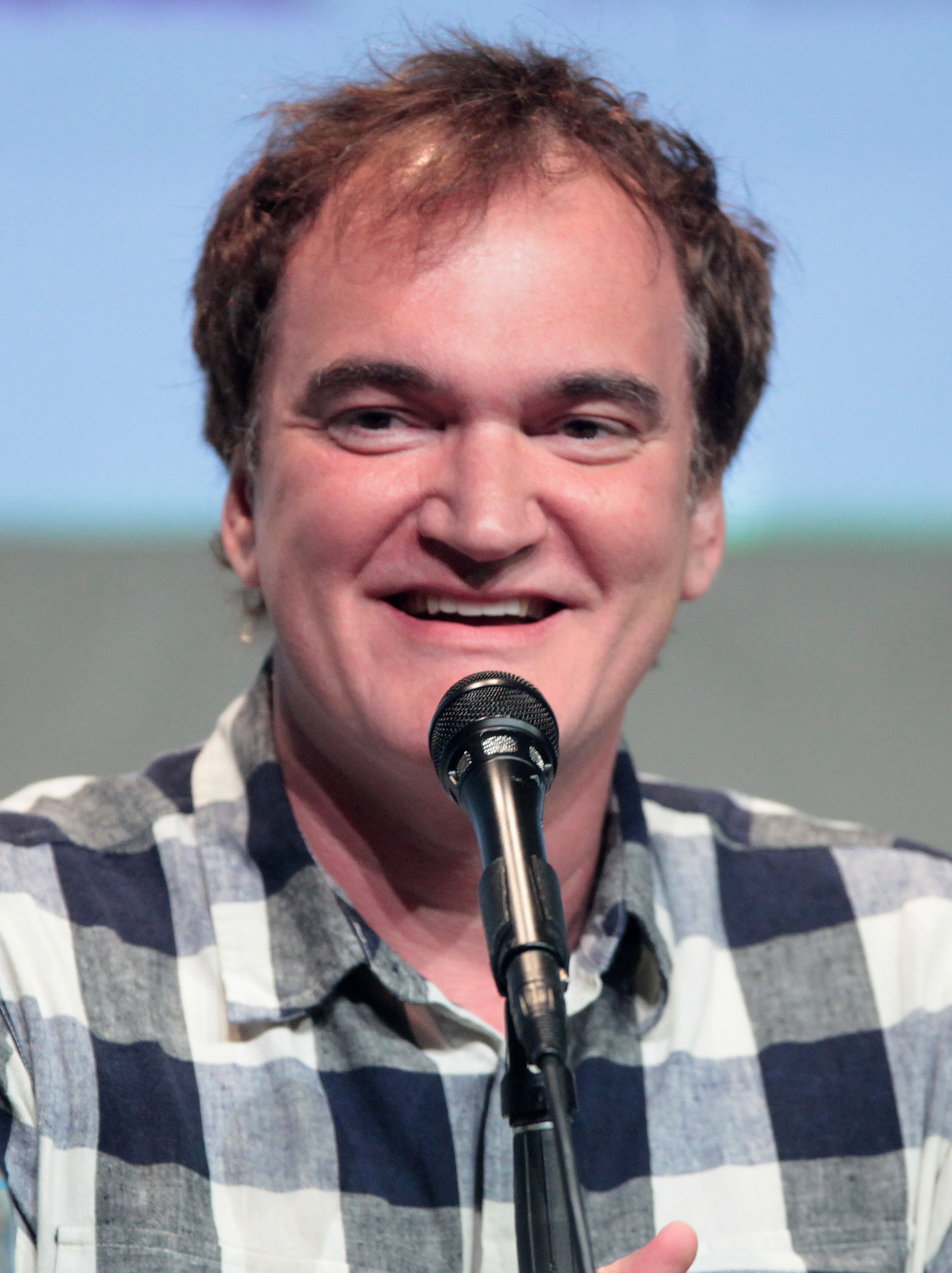
Quentin Tarantino began developing a Star Trek film in December 2017, but this ended when he chose not to direct it in January 2020.

Tarantino's story was based on the Original Series episode "A Piece of the Action" (1968), which is set on an alien planet with an "Earth-like 1920s gangster culture". A few days after the project was revealed, Tarantino and Abrams convened a writers' room consisting of Mark L. Smith, Lindsey Beer, Drew Pearce, and Megan Amram to begin developing the idea into a film. One of the group would be chosen to write the screenplay while Tarantino focused on his ninth film, Once Upon a Time in Hollywood (2019); Smith was considered to be the frontrunner. In their initial discussions with the director, Abrams and Paramount agreed that the film could receive an R-rating like Tarantino's previous films, which would have made it the first R-rated Star Trek film.

Smith was officially hired to write the screenplay by the end of December and Tarantino was considering directing the film. Paramount president Wyck Godfrey gave the project as an example of how the studio was rejuvenating its existing franchises, believing that "people's eyes light up" at the thought of Tarantino joining the Star Trek franchise. Previous Star Trek actors Patrick Stewart and William Shatner both expressed interest in returning to the franchise to work with Tarantino on the film after they respectively portrayed Jean-Luc Picard in The Next Generation and James T. Kirk in The Original Series. Quinto assumed that the cast of the reboot films would be starring in Tarantino's film, as did Simon Pegg who portrays Montgomery Scott in the reboot films. In April 2018, Tarantino's film was reported to be set in a different timeline from the reboot films' Kelvin Timeline, and had the potential to be another reboot of the franchise.

Tarantino confirmed in May 2019 that his Star Trek film was still in development, explaining that the script had been written and he would return to the project following the release of Once Upon a Time in Hollywood that July. A month later, he said he would be giving notes on the script and confirmed that the film would be rated R. In July, Tarantino said he had read Smith's script and liked it, but there were elements that he wanted to work on. He described the film as "Pulp Fiction in space", referring to his own 1994 film. He also said that he was a fan of Pine's and Quinto's performances in the reboot films and wanted them to star in his film, but he wanted his story to be a direct prequel to the original Star Trek series rather than be set in the alternate Kelvin Timeline; when discussing the franchise's different timelines with Abrams, Tarantino said, "I don't understand this, I don't like it", and Abrams encouraged him to ignore them completely.

When asked how a Star Trek film would fit into his ten film plan, Tarantino acknowledged that he could use a loophole by saying "Star Trek doesn't count" and then make a tenth original film, but suggested that he would rather commit to making ten films whether one was part of the Star Trek franchise or not. In December 2019, Tarantino said he was "steering away" from directing the film but had made no official decision. A month later, he confirmed that he was not going to direct the film. He did think it was a good idea for a Star Trek film and suggested that it still be made, offering to give notes on the first cut. Smith later compared his script to the film Thor: Ragnarok (2017) and felt it would have brought a new tone and feeling to the Star Trek franchise in a similar way to what that film did for the Marvel Cinematic Universe (MCU). Smith also explained that the film's R-rating would have primarily come from violence and tone rather than language, as the script only used profanity a few times for "special characters to kind of drop that into the Star Trek world".

== S. J. Clarkson ==
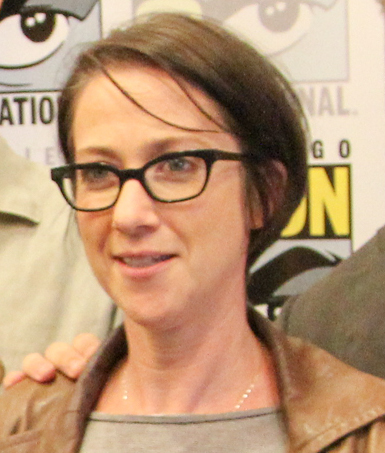
S. J. Clarkson was hired to be the first female director for a Star Trek film, but her version of the project was canceled by January 2019.

S. J. Clarkson entered talks to direct the Beyond sequel in April 2018. Abrams and Paramount held an extensive search for a female director, and Clarkson would have been the first woman to direct a Star Trek film. Payne and McKay had completed the screenplay, but Paramount had yet to sign new contracts for the main cast outside of Pine and Quinto, including Urban, Pegg, John Cho (Hikaru Sulu), and Zoe Saldaña (Nyota Uhura). After Clarkson joined the film, Quinto said the project was entering the "logistical kind of phase" and expressed excitement at working with the director again after they had worked together on the television series Heroes (2006–2010). In July 2018, Jennifer Morrison expressed interest in reprising her role as George Kirk's wife Winona from the first reboot film, and Danai Gurira was close to being cast in the film. Pegg met with Clarkson to discuss the project and expected production to begin in early 2019.

Contract negotiations between Pine, Hemsworth, and the studios ended with Pine and Hemsworth leaving the film in August 2018. The pair had existing deals for the film after Pine had signed on in June 2015 and Hemsworth had been attached in July 2016, but Paramount and Skydance wanted to lower the budget for the film following the financial underperformance of Beyond and planned to decrease the actors' salaries as part of this. Development of the film was expected to continue without Pine and Hemsworth, as it was considered a priority project for the studios. Negotiations with Saldaña, Quinto, Urban, Pegg, and Cho had not yet begun by that point, as they had been waiting until talks with Pine and Hemsworth had been completed. At the end of the month, Urban said production for the film was expected to take place in the United Kingdom, where Clarkson is based, and that it was just waiting on negotiations with Pine and Hemsworth to resume. Pine stated a month later that he still wanted to make the film and said "we will see what happens". By January 2019, the film had been canceled and Clarkson moved on to other projects.

In May 2019, Hemsworth said he had turned down the film because he was underwhelmed by the script. Payne and McKay revealed in October 2022 that they had worked on the script for two-and-a-half years with Clarkson and Weber. Their story was inspired by the Next Generation episode "Relics" (1992) in which Montgomery Scott is discovered to be alive inside a transporter buffer many years after his presumed death. In Payne and McKay's script, the Enterprise crew explore the wreckage of the USS Kelvin from the first reboot film and discover that George Kirk saved a copy of himself before the ship exploded, allowing him to now interact with his son. The writers described the story as a father-son galactic adventure featuring a similar relationship to that between Harrison Ford's Indiana Jones and his father Henry, played by Sean Connery, in Indiana Jones and the Last Crusade (1989). They said the film had an original villain and was based on a core science fiction idea inspired by 2001: A Space Odyssey (1968).

== Noah Hawley ==
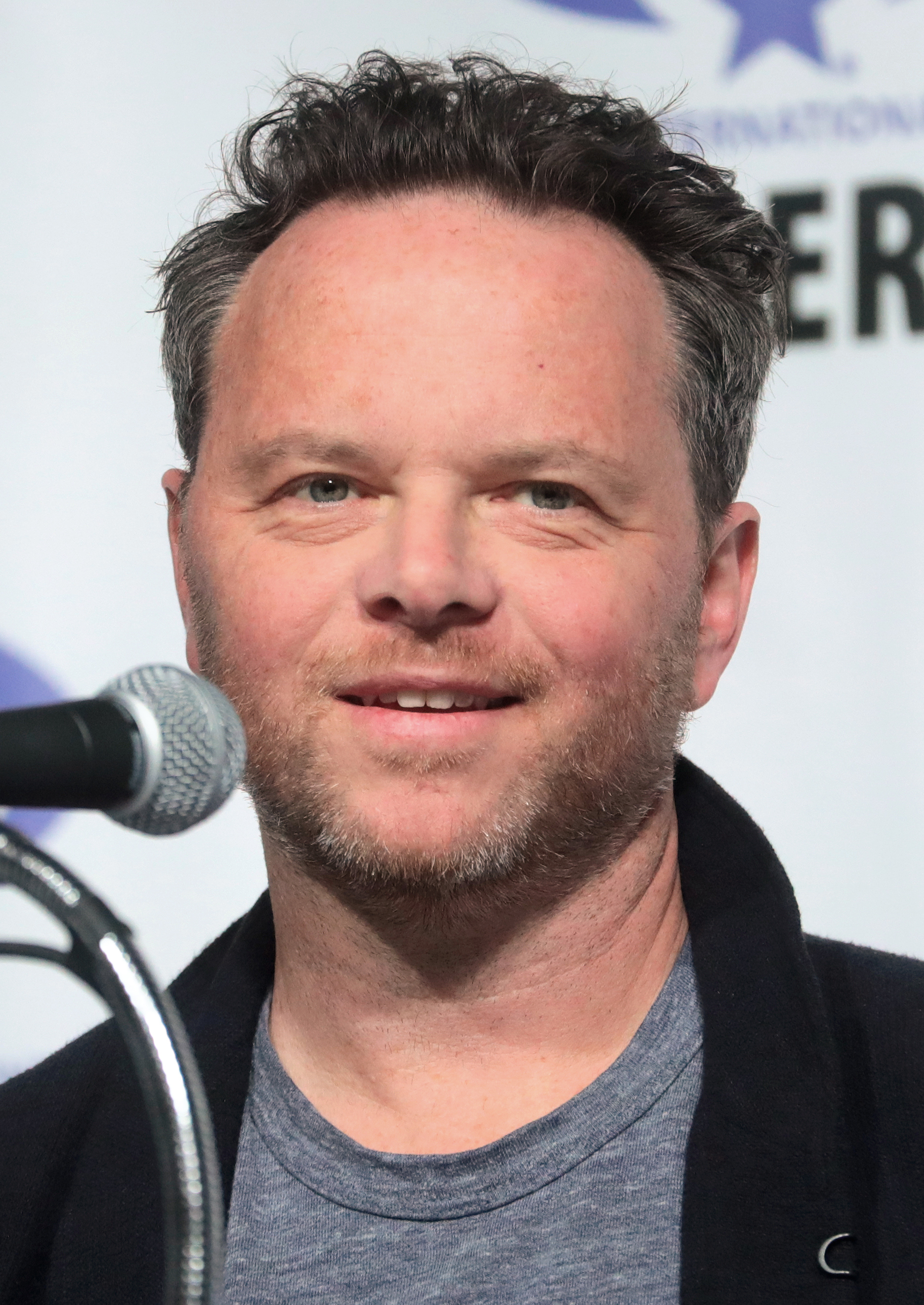
Noah Hawley was hired to write and direct a new Star Trek film in November 2019, but it did not move forward.

Noah Hawley was hired to write and direct a new Star Trek film for Paramount in November 2019, which he would have produced under his 26 Keys Production company alongside Abrams. The film was set to feature a new plot, separate from the George Kirk time travel premise and Tarantino's story idea. Initial reports said the film would be a sequel to Beyond and see Pine, Quinto, Urban, and Saldaña all return. Paramount and Skydance were said to be hopeful that negotiations with the cast would be more successful without Hemsworth and with a new story.

In January 2020, Hawley said he would begin work on the film after completing the fourth season of his television series Fargo (2020). He said calling the film Star Trek 4 was a misnomer and reports of the Beyond cast returning were not necessarily correct, because he approached Paramount with his own vision for the franchise that was going in a new direction and would likely involve new characters. Hawley wanted to tell a new story that was respectful of the source material, as he did with Fargo and the Marvel Comics-based series Legion (2017–2019). He specifically wanted to evoke the Star Trek values of "exploration and humanity at its best, and diversity and creative problem solving". Hawley referenced a scene from Star Trek II: The Wrath of Khan (1982) in which Kirk "puts on his reading glasses and lowers Khan's shields. It doesn't cost anything. But it's that triumphant feeling about [out]smarting your enemy" that he wanted to recreate. Hawley discussed the film with his frequent composer Jeff Russo, who coincidentally was already the composer for the series Discovery and Star Trek: Picard (2020–2023). Russo was excited about the possibility of working on Hawley's film, and said they discussed Hawley's story and intentions for the film's music. Russo began composing musical themes for the film.

ViacomCBS CEO Bob Bakish said in February that Paramount was only developing one new Star Trek film. Hawley was still working on the film in May, during the COVID-19 pandemic, but it was placed on hold in August by new Paramount Pictures president Emma Watts, whose top priority was to figure out the direction of the Star Trek franchise. Watts was considering between continuing work on Hawley's film, making a new attempt at a sequel to Beyond with the cast of the previous reboot films, or revisiting Tarantino's story with a new director. Deadline Hollywood's Mike Fleming Jr. suggested that a film featuring the previous cast may have the "cleanest path" forward, with the Hawley and Tarantino films deemed more suitable as spin-offs from the core franchise akin to the film Logan (2017), which is a spin-off from the X-Men franchise. Fleming added that the next Star Trek film would need to emphasise improved overseas box office returns.

In September 2020, Hawley said his film was "still alive, just in stasis". He confirmed that it was going to feature new characters, and said his story had an explicit connection to the existing Star Trek canon in a similar way to how the first season of Fargo (2014) has a story connection to the 1996 film of the same name. The screenplay reportedly featured a deadly virus plot that could be considered "awkward" due to the pandemic. In November 2020, Hawley said the film did not appear to be happening anymore. In June 2021, he lamented that the film did not work out and said it had been very close to production when Watts put it on hold, with casting in progress, filming set to take place in Australia, and Hawley preparing to move to that country. In February 2024, Hawley revealed that actors Cate Blanchett and Rami Malek had been attached to his version of the film.

== 2020–21 developments ==
In May 2020, Pegg said the cast of the reboot films had remained in contact but they were unsure what the future of the film series was, and their enthusiasm for making another film had been partially diminished by Yelchin's death. He suggested that any new Star Trek film be more "restrained" than the previous reboot films, considering the franchise was more niche and making less money than other big films like those of the MCU. He also questioned whether the franchise should prioritize television over future films, particularly with the advancement in production quality for television in recent years. Quinto echoed this sentiment the next month, noting that multiple new Star Trek television series had been produced since Beyond was released, including Discovery and Picard, and stating that he was no longer expecting a fourth film to be made with the reboot cast.

Robert Sallin, the producer of Star Trek II: The Wrath of Khan, revealed in July 2020 that he had a concept for a new Star Trek film that he was writing a script for. Sallin discussed his concept with Paramount, but was told that the studio would not consider any other pitches for Star Trek films while they were working with Hawley. In October, Kurtzman expressed interest in uniting the film and television sides of the franchise. Jamie Lovett of ComicBook.com speculated that this could lead to a film starring the cast of Discovery. Also during 2020, The Wrath of Khan director Nicholas Meyer wrote a detailed proposal with his producing partner Steven-Charles Jaffe for a new Star Trek project, including a treatment and illustrations. Meyer said the project was not connected to any of the franchise's previous films and was set in a gap in the Star Trek timeline where an original story could be told with new characters. He described the project as a feature film, but said it could also be a television series or a combination of television and film. Meyer and Jaffe presented this proposal to Kurtzman, Abrams, and Watts, but had not heard back from Paramount by March 2021. At that time, Paramount hired Discovery writer Kalinda Vazquez to write a new Star Trek film based on her own original idea, with Abrams's Bad Robot producing.

== Matt Shakman ==
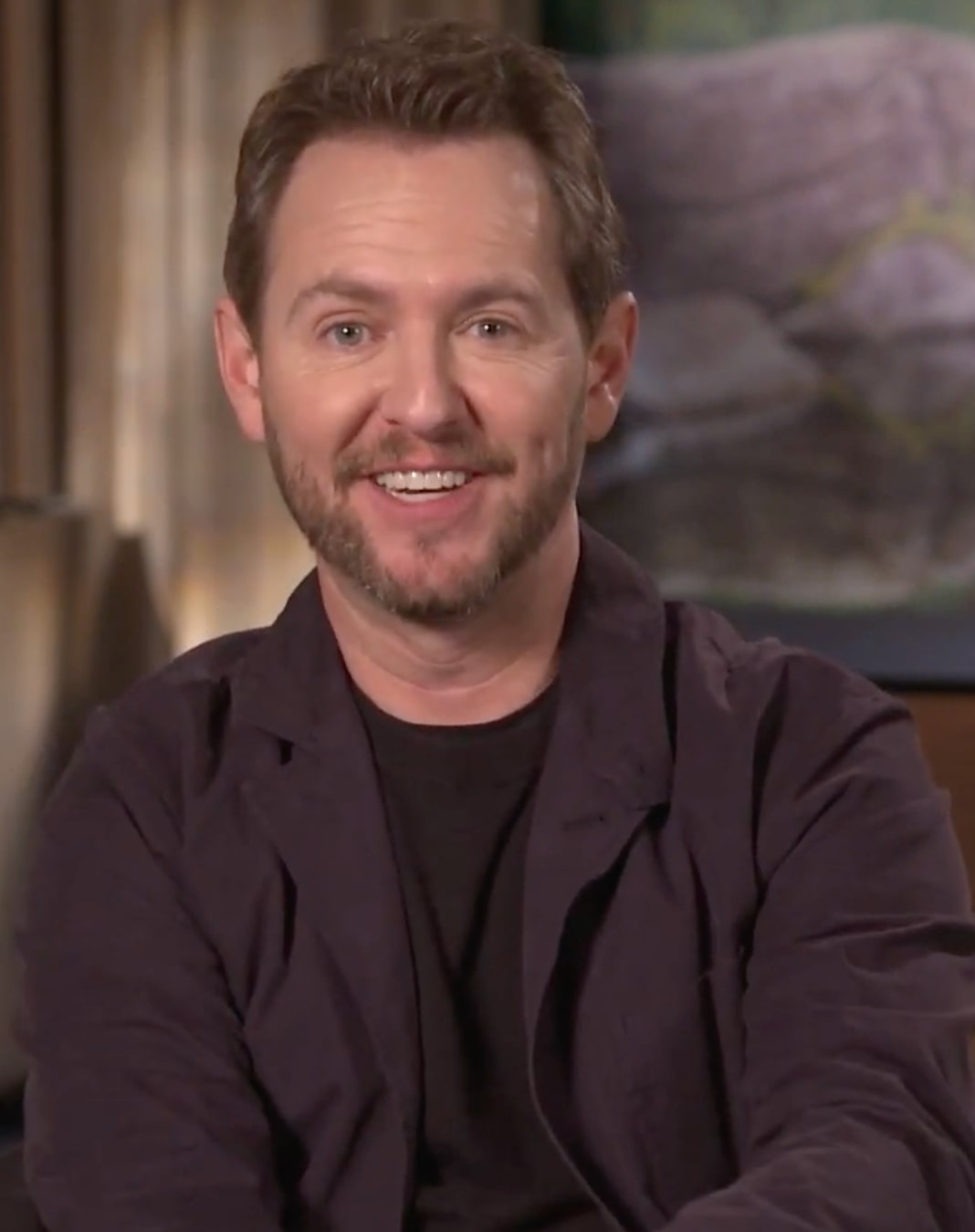
Matt Shakman was hired to direct a new Star Trek film in July 2021, but left the project in August 2022 to direct The Fantastic Four: First Steps instead.

In April 2021, Paramount scheduled an untitled Star Trek film for release on June 9, 2023. After his success directing the Marvel Studios miniseries WandaVision (2021), Matt Shakman turned down several offers in favor of directing the next Star Trek film, signing a deal in mid-July. Watts pushed hard to hire Shakman for the project and his signing was considered to be a coup for her. Abrams was confirmed to be producing the film, with a screenplay written by Beer and Geneva Robertson-Dworet that was separate from the script that Vazquez was writing. Shakman's film was set for the June 2023 release date, and was said to be moving at "warp speed" after his hiring ahead of a planned filming start in early to mid-2022. No deals with cast members had been made at that point but Paramount hoped for Pine and the other main cast from the reboot films to return. Due to the length of time with no new Star Trek films after Beyond, the studio did market research to determine whether audiences were still interested in the previous cast. Paramount chose to bring them back after determining that there was "lasting audience enthusiasm" for the group. In November 2021, the film's release was pushed back to December 22, 2023. By then, Josh Friedman and Cameron Squires were re-writing the screenplay.

Abrams and new Paramount Pictures CEO Brian Robbins announced during a Paramount investor event in February 2022 that the main cast from the previous three reboot films would be returning, including Pine, Quinto, Pegg, Urban, Saldaña, and Cho. The announcement was considered to be a breakthrough following the previous failed attempts to continue the franchise, but it came as a surprise to the actors and their agents as negotiations had not yet begun for their return. Pine would be the first cast member to enter early negotiations because he was considered to be the "lynchpin" for the project. Borys Kit and Mia Galuppo explained for The Hollywood Reporter that the script was still being worked on and an official budget or greenlight had yet to be given by Paramount. The budget would now likely need to take into account larger actor deals since Paramount had given up its negotiating leverage by making the announcement first. The studio chose to do that so they could promote the film during the investor event, and was willing to pay more for the cast than during initial negotiations with Pine in 2018 due to the different entertainment landscape: larger acting deals had become more common in the streaming era, Paramount had new executives and was in a stronger financial position, and the studio needed to provide content for the streaming service Paramount+. Star Trek was considered to be a key franchise in the service's international expansion due to its science fiction storytelling and diverse cast.

Pine stated in March 2022 that he had not seen a script for the film, but the cast was excited to return. Saldaña reiterated this, and both actors said the group felt they would be honoring Yelchin's memory by continuing the series. Urban expressed interest in returning but had a potential scheduling conflict with his series The Boys (2019–2026). Pine suggested in April that the next film should have a smaller budget and focus on pleasing existing Star Trek fans rather than hoping to make as much money as an MCU film. Variety reported that Pine's salary for the film was US$13 million. Crew members had been hired and soundstages had been set, ahead of a planned filming start in mid-2022. Creature designer Neville Page and makeup designer James MacKinnon were both hired to return from previous Star Trek projects. Around that August, work on the film was halted, its crew was let go, and the planned filming start was dropped. MacKinnon believed script issues were the cause of the shutdown. By that time, Shakman had been approached by Marvel Studios about directing their film The Fantastic Four: First Steps (2025). He decided to leave the Star Trek film since work on it had stalled while The Fantastic Four: First Steps had momentum. Shakman's decision was revealed at the end of the month. Paramount lamented that "the timing didn't align" for Shakman to work on both films. The Star Trek film was still considered a top priority for the studio, which immediately began searching for a new director. It was removed from the studio's release schedule soon after. Shakman declined to reveal details about the story because he believed his version of the film was still in development.

== 2023–24 developments ==
Following Shakman's departure, Jonathan Frakes—one of the stars of The Next Generation who directed several Star Trek films and episodes—reached out to Abrams about taking over as director, but they did not have any "real talks". There were no updates on the film by January 2023. At that time, Sofia Boutella expressed interest in reprising her Beyond role as Jaylah in the next film. At the start of March, Abrams said the search for a new director was underway and expressed his belief that the story for the next film was as compelling as the story for the 2009 reboot film. Pine had still yet to read a script for the next film by then. Later in March, Kurtzman expressed interest in expanding the franchise into television films, and the next month Paramount+ announced the Discovery spin-off "event film" Star Trek: Section 31 (2025). Kurtzman reportedly planned to release a Star Trek streaming film every two years. In August, Quinto said different views on the direction of the next reboot film were delaying its development. He said it would be wonderful if another film was made and highlighted the friendships among the cast, but if this did not happen then they "had a great run" and he was happy to see Ethan Peck portraying Spock in the series Star Trek: Strange New Worlds (2022–present), which is a prequel to The Original Series. By the end of September, following the conclusion of the 2023 Writers Guild of America strike, Paramount was planning to have writers "fine-tuning" the script for the next reboot film in the near future.

Paramount was revealed in January 2024 to be expanding its Star Trek film slate to have multiple films in development, inspired by the success of the multiple Star Trek series on Paramount+. A franchise "origin story" film was announced in addition to Star Trek 4. The latter was described as the "final chapter" in the main reboot film series. Steve Yockey was writing a new script draft for Star Trek 4 by the end of March, when the origin story film was expected to move forward first. Vazquez's film was reportedly still in development as well. Toby Haynes and Seth Grahame-Smith were set to direct and write the origin story film, respectively, with Abrams producing. Deadline Hollywood reported that it would be set decades before the first reboot film, which takes place in the early 23rd century of the Kelvin Timeline; Variety indicated that it would actually be set in the Prime Timeline; and The Hollywood Reporter said it could be another reboot, set primarily on Earth close to modern times and depicting humanity's first contact with alien life as well as the creation of Starfleet. Paramount wanted lower budgets for the next Star Trek films due to the reboot films' lower box office returns. The fact that production was underway on Paramount+'s Section 31 was considered an "awkward contrast" with the lack of progress on the franchise's next feature film in the nearly 10 years since Beyond was released. Simon Kinberg was in talks to join Abrams as a producer on the origin story film by the end of May. There was potential for Kinberg to become the "franchise shepherd" for Paramount's Star Trek feature films, comparable to Kurtzman's position as the lead producer of the Star Trek television series. Kinberg previously held a similar role for the X-Men franchise.

== Skydance merger and cancelation ==
By July 2025, there had been no updates on either the origin film or Star Trek 4 amid an ongoing merger between Paramount Global (formally known as ViacomCBS) and Skydance Media. Despite reports that the origin film was targeting a 2026 release to align with the franchise's 60th anniversary, that was deemed unlikely and decisions on the film series' future were not expected until after the merger, which was pending government approval. Ellison was set to become chairman and CEO of Paramount following the merger, and discussed plans to "reevaluate" key franchises such as Star Trek and unify them across film and television. With most of the Star Trek series on Paramount+ canceled and Kurtzman's deal set to expire in 2026, there was also speculation about the franchise's future on television. The merger was completed in August 2025, and the new Paramount Skydance decided by November to move on from the idea of bringing back the cast of the reboot films in favor of a "fresh" new film for the franchise. In the middle of November, Jonathan Goldstein and John Francis Daley were hired to write and direct a new Star Trek film, and produce it under their GoldDay banner. It was reported to be a new take with no connections to previous films and series, or to previous film development work.
