= Chain of Command (Star Trek: The Next Generation) =

- Star Trek: The Next Generation episodes
- Episode nos.: Season 6 Episodes 10 and 11
- Directed by: Robert Scheerer (Part I); Les Landau (Part II)
- Written by: Frank Abatemarco (Part II)
- Story by: Frank Abatemarco (Part I)
- Teleplay by: Ronald D. Moore (Part I)
- Production codes: 236 and 237
- Original air dates: December 14, 1992; December 21, 1992

Guest appearances
- Ronny Cox - Capt. Edward Jellico; Natalia Nogulich - Adm. Alynna Nechayev; John Durbin - Gul Lemec; Lou Wagner - Solok; David Warner - Gul Madred; Heather Lauren Olson - Jil Orra; Majel Barrett - Computer Voice

Episode chronology
← Previous "The Quality of Life"	Next → "Ship in a Bottle"
- Star Trek: The Next Generation season 6

"Chain of Command" is a two-part episode of the American science fiction television series Star Trek: The Next Generation. It aired as the 10th and 11th episodes of the sixth season, the 136th and 137th episodes of the series.

Set in the 24th century, the series follows the adventures of the Starfleet crew of the Federation starship Enterprise-D. In this episode, Jean-Luc Picard is relieved of command of the Enterprise and reassigned to lead a covert mission, while his replacement is assigned to deal with the Cardassians openly. The second part of the episode is noted for the intense performance of Patrick Stewart and its depiction of brutal torture and interrogation scenes. The episode has been frequently ranked among the ten best in The Next Generation.

This episode has guest performances by Ronny Cox as Captain Jellico, and David Warner as Gul Madred. A scene that pays homage to the novel 1984 is noted for a contest of wills between Picard and Madred about perception of reality under coercion (seeing four lights vs. five). Both episodes were the last of The Next Generation to air before its spinoff, Deep Space Nine, premiered in January 1993. As such, "Chain of Command" revisits the Cardassian political situation leading in to Deep Space Nine, where the species plays a crucial role.

The character of Edward Jellico, who was introduced in this episode, would later return as a recurring character in Star Trek: Prodigy where he has become a high-ranking Starfleet admiral.

== Plot ==
=== Part I ===
Jean-Luc Picard (Patrick Stewart), Worf (Michael Dorn), and Beverly Crusher (Gates McFadden) are assigned by Starfleet on a covert mission to seek and destroy a Cardassian biological weapons installation on their border world, Celtris III. In Picard's place, Starfleet assigns Captain Edward Jellico (Ronny Cox), who has a vastly different style of command than the Enterprise crew, particularly William Riker (Jonathan Frakes), are accustomed to. Under Jellico, the Enterprise patrols the border near Minos Korva, a strategically significant Federation planet, and holds tense negotiations with Cardassian representatives as to the fate of the planet.

After intensive training in the holodeck, Picard, Worf, and Crusher discreetly arrive on Celtris III, and infiltrate the base. However, they find no signs of biological weapons, and suspecting a trap, they attempt to flee. Worf and Crusher escape, but Picard is taken prisoner and brought to Gul Madred (David Warner), who informs him Celtris III was a trap designed to capture Picard.

=== Part II ===
Madred uses a number of torture methods, including sensory deprivation, sensory bombardment, forced nakedness, stress positions, dehydration, starvation, physical pain, and cultural humiliation to try to gain knowledge of the Federation's plans for Minos Korva. Picard refuses to acknowledge Madred's demand for information. Madred attempts another tactic to break Picard's will: he shows his captive four bright lights, and demands that Picard answer that there are five, inflicting intense pain on Picard if he does not agree.

Meanwhile, the Cardassians inform the Enterprise crew that Picard has been captured. Jellico refuses to acknowledge that Picard was on a Starfleet mission, an admission necessary for Picard to be given the rights of a prisoner of war rather than being subjected to torture as a terrorist. This leads to a heated argument between Jellico and Riker, which ends with Jellico relieving Riker of duty and assigning Data as first officer. La Forge detects residue from a nearby nebula on the hull of the Cardassian delegation's ship, and Jellico suspects a Cardassian fleet may attempt to use the cover of the nebula to launch an attack on Minos Korva. Jellico determines that their best course of action is to place mines across the nebula using a shuttlecraft. However, Riker is the most qualified pilot for the mission. Jellico visits Riker in his quarters, where he candidly criticizes Riker's performance as a first officer and Riker does the same for his command style. Jellico asks, rather than orders, Riker to pilot the shuttle. Riker agrees, and he and La Forge successfully lay the minefield. Jellico uses the threat of the minefield to force the Cardassians to disarm and retreat, but not before they release Picard.

With word of the failure of the Cardassians to secure Minos Korva, Madred attempts one last ploy to break Picard, by falsely claiming that the Cardassians have taken the planet and that the Enterprise was destroyed in the battle. He offers Picard a choice: to remain in captivity for the rest of his life or live in comfort by admitting that he sees five lights. As Picard momentarily considers the offer, the Cardassian head delegate enters the room and informs Madred that "a ship is waiting to take him back to the Enterprise." Picard realizes he has been duped. As Picard is freed from his bonds and about to be taken away, he turns to Madred and defiantly shouts, "There are four lights!" Picard is returned to Federation custody and reinstated as commanding officer of the Enterprise. Picard admits privately to Counselor Troi (Marina Sirtis) that he was saved just in the nick of time, as by that point he was broken enough to be willing to say or do anything to make the torture stop – and by the end, he actually believed he could see five lights.

== Production ==
=== Writing ===
Writer Frank Abatemarco consulted with resources compiled by Amnesty International on the methods, psychology and the survivors of torture.

=== Casting ===
Warner and Stewart first worked together in a production of Hamlet in 1965. Warner praised Stewart, who was early in his Shakespearean career at the time. Warner had previously appeared as different characters in two Star Trek films: St. John Talbot in Star Trek V: The Final Frontier and Chancellor Gorkon in Star Trek VI: The Undiscovered Country. The actor initially cast as Gul Madred in "Chain of Command" dropped out on short notice, and with only a few days before production, Warner had no opportunity to learn his lines. His dialogue was written onto boards for him to read out as he went along. He preferred the Madred character to either of his previous Star Trek characters because of the scenes with Stewart, which he called "wonderful".

== Reception ==
This two-part episode is ranked tenth in Entertainment Weekly's list of top ten Star Trek: The Next Generation episodes. Variety listed "Chain of Command, Part I" and "Chain of Command, Part II" as the sixth best episode (counting the two-parter as one) of Star Trek: The Next Generation.

In 2013, Slate ranked "Chain of Command" one of the ten best episodes in the Star Trek franchise.

In 2014, Io9 rated it the 11th best Star Trek episode.

In 2015, The Hollywood Reporter, noted this episode's scene where Picard cries out "There are four lights", as one of the top ten "most stunning" moments of Star Trek: The Next Generation.

In 2016, Radio Times rated the "there are four lights" scene with Picard as the 11th greatest scene in all Star Trek including films and television. They praised the contributions of David Warner and Patrick Stewart to Star Trek. They note David Warner had previously played a role in 1991 film Star Trek VI: The Undiscovered Country. In 2016, CNET noted that "Chain of Command" was rated one of the top ten episodes of all Star Trek episodes in an audience-based rating at the Star Trek 50th anniversary convention. In 2016, The Washington Post ranked the two-part "Chain of Command" as the fifth best episode of all Star Trek. They point out famous scenes, such when Picard (Patrick Stewart) is tortured by a Cardassian after being captured, but also Captain Jellico (Ronny Cox) struggling to command the Enterprise crew.

Empire ranked "Chain of Command" (Parts I & II) 16th out of the top fifty episodes of all Star Trek in 2016. At that time, there were roughly 726 episodes and a dozen films released.

In 2016, IGN ranked "Chain of Command" (Parts I & II) the 13th best episode of all Star Trek series. They note the performances of guest stars Ronny Cox, as the autocratic Captain Jellico, and David Warner as the Cardassian Gul Madred. They note the double story lines of Jellico trying to command the crew of the Enterprise-D, and Picard enduring a brutal interrogation.

In 2017, Den of Geek included the "Chain of Command" two-part episode as one of their 25 recommended watches of Star Trek: The Next Generation. A regional newspaper of Cleveland, Ohio, ranked 25 of the greatest episodes of Star Trek prior to Star Trek: Discovery, and included "Chain of Command" as the fifth greatest in 2017. In 2017, Den of Geek ranked David Warner's performance as Gul Madred, as the second best guest acting performance on Star Trek: The Next Generation, for his performance in "Chain of Command". They elaborate that David Warner gives a "...calm, measured performance", which they said "perfectly matches Stewart's slowly crumbling Picard". The interaction between Gul Madred and Captain Picard was noted as "one of Star Trek's most memorable confrontations..".

In 2017, Nerdist ranked this episode(s) the sixth best episode of Star Trek: The Next Generation.

In 2018, CBR ranked "Chain of Command" (Parts I & II) as the fifth best episodic saga of all Star Trek, in between "All Good Things..." as #6 (the Star Trek: The Next Generation finale) and "In a Mirror, Darkly" from Star Trek: Enterprise (#4). In 2018, Entertainment Weekly ranked "Chain of Command" as one of the top ten moments of Jean-Luc Picard.

A character in this episode, Captain Jellico, was ranked as the 68th most important character of Starfleet within the Star Trek science fiction universe by Wired. TheGamer ranked Captain Jellico as the 14th best captain of Star Trek. In 2018, Tom's Guide rated "Chain of Command" (Parts I & II) one of the 15 best episodes featuring Picard.

In June 2019, Screen Rant noted "Chain of Command" as the second best episode of all 755 episodes of Star Trek up to that time. They highlight Captain Jellico in command of the Enterprise-D, and Captain Picard trying to endure a brutal Cardassian interrogation. Patrick Stewart's acting performance as a captive Picard is especially praised, noting the story as a showcase of the human spirit against lies and adversity. In 2019, they also ranked "Chain of Command" the eighth best episode of Star Trek: The Next Generation.

In May 2019, The Hollywood Reporter ranked "Chain of Command" (Parts I & II) among the top twenty-five episodes of Star Trek: The Next Generation.

In 2019, IGN recommended watching both parts of "Chain of Command" as background for another Star Trek universe show, Star Trek: Picard; a show that will also feature the same character as in this episode, Picard. They note a plot that tackles the struggles of people with bureaucracy, bad leadership, and suffering. They note performances by Ronny Cox as Captain Jellico, and David Warner's brutal presentation as the Cardassian alien interrogator Gul Madred. They note the struggle between Picard and Madred characters, and their battle for truth vs. information about the Federation.

In 2020, Vulture recommended this as one of the best Star Treks to watch along with Star Trek: Picard.

In 2021, Robert Vaux writing for CBR, said this was the high point of the sixth season and noted David Warner's Cardassian character.

== Releases ==
The episode was released as part of the Star Trek: The Next Generation season six DVD box set in the United States on December 3, 2002. A remastered HD version was released on Blu-ray optical disc, on June 24, 2014.

"Chain of Command" was released in the United Kingdom on PAL-Format LaserDisc on April 7, 1997. The episode was published on a two-sided 12" optical disc with runtime of 88 minutes.

It was also one of the episodes included in the anthology DVD box set Star Trek Fan Collective - Captain's Log; the set also includes the TNG episodes "In Theory" and "Darmok" among other episodes from the franchise. The set was released on July 24, 2007 in the United States.

"Chain of Command" was included in a Picard box-set released on October 15, 2019, along with "Best of Both Worlds", and the four TNG theatrical films. The release included a making of feature for "Chain of Command" and also the episode(s) can be watched with an audio commentary by Ronny Cox, Jonathan West, and Mike & Denise Okuda.

== See also ==
- Gaslighting – Type of psychological manipulation
