= The Chase (Star Trek: The Next Generation) =

- Star Trek: The Next Generation episode
- Episode no.: Season 6 Episode 20
- Directed by: Jonathan Frakes
- Story by: Joe Menosky; Ronald D. Moore
- Teleplay by: Joe Menosky
- Cinematography by: Jonathan West
- Production code: 246
- Original air date: April 26, 1993

Guest appearances
- Salome Jens - Ancient Humanoid; John Cothran, Jr. - Nu'Daq; Maurice Roëves - Romulan Captain; Linda Thorson - Ocett; Norman Lloyd - Professor Galen

Episode chronology
← Previous "Lessons"	Next → "Frame of Mind"
- Star Trek: The Next Generation season 6

"The Chase" is the 146th episode of the syndicated American science fiction television series Star Trek: The Next Generation, the 20th episode of the sixth season. It is directed by series cast member Jonathan Frakes (Commander William Riker).

Set in the 24th century, the series follows the adventures of the Starfleet crew of the USS Enterprise-D. In this episode, four competing expeditions—Federation, Klingon, Cardassian, and Romulan—attempt to solve an ancient genetic puzzle.

The plot of the episode would later be revisited in season 5 of Star Trek: Discovery where several factions race to find the technology used by the aliens, known in Discovery as the Progenitors, to create life.

== Plot ==
Captain Picard (Patrick Stewart) is visited by his former mentor, Professor Richard Galen (Norman Lloyd). Galen states that he has come across something in his travels which could be the most profound discovery of their time. However, Galen will not tell Picard about what he has found unless Picard agrees to go with him, which means leaving the Enterprise and his career in Starfleet behind. Picard ultimately declines, although he is torn about disappointing his former mentor.

Shortly after leaving the Enterprise, Galen's transport vessel is attacked and boarded. When the Enterprise arrives, a critically injured Galen is beamed to Sickbay and, before he dies, he apologises to Picard for his earlier rude remarks. Picard decides to investigate Professor Galen's research; an investigation of Galen's ship yields no results other than a series of seemingly random number blocks.

After studying the ambiguous number blocks for hours, the discovery is made that these fragments are compatible DNA strands which have been recovered from different worlds all over the galaxy. The crew eventually believe that they have discovered an embedded genetic pattern that is constant throughout many different species, and it is speculated that this was left by an early race that pre-dates all other known civilizations. This would ultimately explain why so many races are humanoid.

Picard concludes that the answer to the puzzle will be revealed when the remaining DNA samples are obtained, and so the Enterprise travels to a remote, uninhabited planet that Galen had mentioned was his next destination. They encounter Klingon and Cardassian ships that appear to be on the same trail, each group believing the puzzle will yield the design of a formidable weapon or the secret of an unlimited power source, respectively.

The Enterprise hosts representatives from the Cardassians and the Klingons, and they all agree to combine the DNA samples that they have found so far, since all three parties have pieces of the puzzle that the others cannot find. Using the shared information, they determine a pattern in how several planets were aligned millions of years ago and extrapolate the position of a final planet.

The Cardassian ship departs ahead of the others, firing at both ships and apparently disabling them. However, Picard had already learned of the Cardassians' attempt to sabotage the Enterprise's defences; the ship is fully functional, and he takes the Klingon captain to the last planet. Upon arrival, they discover that almost all life is extinct, but scans by the Enterprise detect residual lichens located on a fossilised seabed, and they beam down to investigate with their tricorders containing all previously known information. The Cardassians arrive, as well as an undetected Romulan force, creating a standoff. Reasoning that the seabed may not be completely fossilised and may still contain some DNA, Picard and Dr. Crusher (Gates McFadden) scan the sea-bed using the tricorder whilst the other parties argue.

They locate the final DNA fragment, which completes and runs the program. The program reconfigures the tricorder's emitter to project a holographic message. The recorded image of an alien humanoid (Salome Jens) is projected to the assembled company, and explains that when her race first explored the galaxy there had been no humanoid-based life other than themselves, so they seeded various planets with "seed codes" to create a legacy of their existence after they had gone - the seed codes would not only influence humanoid development of life on the planets, but also contain fragments of a map to find the source. The alien ends her message assuming that the various alien races have come together in harmony to work together in solving the DNA puzzle and congratulates them on their triumph.

The Cardassians and the Klingons are outraged by this revelation; only the Federation representatives seem optimistic and all parties depart back to their respective homes. Before leaving, the Romulan commander hails Picard and expresses his own optimism, commenting that humans and Romulans are perhaps not so dissimilar after all.

== Reception ==
In 2017, Popular Mechanics said that "The Chase" was one of the top ten most fun episodes of Star Trek: The Next Generation, noting that it offers an explanation of why most aliens on Star Trek are similar to humans. They note the episode includes Cardassians, Klingons, Romulans and Federation members on a quest to solve a biological enigma.

In 2019, Screen Rant ranked "The Chase" as the second of the ten most important episodes of Star Trek: The Next Generation to watch in preparation for the series Star Trek: Picard.

In 2020, SyFy also recommended watching "The Chase" as background on the Romulans for Star Trek: Picard.
