= Relics (Star Trek: The Next Generation) =

- Star Trek: The Next Generation episode
- Episode no.: Season 6 Episode 4
- Directed by: Alexander Singer
- Written by: Ronald D. Moore
- Cinematography by: Jonathan West
- Production code: 230
- Original air date: October 12, 1992

Guest appearances
- James Doohan – Montgomery Scott; Lanei Chapman – Sariel Rager; Erick Weiss – Kane; Stacie Foster – Bartel; Ernie Mirich – Waiter; Majel Barrett – Computer Voice

Episode chronology
← Previous "Man of the People"	Next → "Schisms"
- Star Trek: The Next Generation season 6

"Relics" is the 130th episode of the syndicated American science fiction television series Star Trek: The Next Generation, the fourth episode of the sixth season.

Set in the 24th century, the series follows the adventures of the Federation starship USS Enterprise-D. In this episode, while investigating the 75-year-old wreck of a Federation transport vessel, the Enterprise crew discovers Montgomery Scott (James Doohan), the former chief engineer of Captain James T. Kirk's Enterprise, alive in a transporter buffer.

This episode features a science fiction depiction of the hypothetical Dyson sphere concept, which was proposed by Freeman Dyson in 1959.

== Plot ==
The starship Enterprise, responding to a distress call, discovers a nearby Dyson sphere. They trace the distress call to the USS Jenolan, a Federation transport ship that has been missing for 75 years, which they find crashed on the sphere's outer shell. Commander William Riker, Chief Engineer Geordi La Forge, and Lieutenant Worf transport to the Jenolan while the Enterprise investigates the sphere. La Forge discovers that the Jenolan's transporter has been jury-rigged to sustain two life signals within its pattern buffer indefinitely, though one has degraded too far to be recovered. La Forge reverses the process and restores the remaining signal, which turns out to be former Starfleet officer Captain Montgomery Scott.

Back aboard the Enterprise, Scott explains that he was only a passenger aboard the Jenolan during his retirement, but when the ship was caught in the Dyson sphere's gravity field, only he and one other officer survived the crash, and Scott had rigged the transporter to try to keep them "alive" until a rescue vessel could arrive. After being cleared by Dr. Beverly Crusher, Scott is eager to see the ship's modern technology, but quickly finds that his old knowledge has long been surpassed and his efforts to help are instead getting in the way of normal operations.

Ordered to leave Engineering by La Forge, Scott heads to Ten Forward, and is dismayed to learn that real alcohol is no longer served on Starfleet ships, having been replaced by "synthehol", which Scott refuses to drink. Lt. Commander Data offers him a potent unknown green beverage from Guinan's private stock, which he takes to one of the Enterprise's holodecks to recreate the bridge of his old Enterprise. Captain Jean-Luc Picard joins Scott to offer encouragement after hearing of his difficulties adjusting to the 24th century, and Scott declares himself a relic of the past. Picard reveals the green drink is Aldebaran whiskey that he provided to Guinan, and the two share stories about their careers.

The next day, at Picard's suggestion, La Forge enlists Scott's help in recovering survey data from the Jenolan's systems, utilizing his knowledge of period Starfleet technology. Meanwhile, the Enterprise discovers a portal on the side of the Dyson sphere, but when they try to communicate with the systems, the ship is pulled into the Dyson sphere by automated controls, temporarily disabling their systems. Though they are able to recover control before the ship collides with the star inside the sphere, they find the star is unstable and emitting large amounts of radiation, which will be lethal to the crew, and surmise that the sphere was long abandoned by its creators due to this. The Enterprise quickly realizes the only exit from the interior of the sphere is the portal they used, but cannot figure out how to open it from their side. When La Forge tries to make contact with the Enterprise, he discovers it missing, and works with Scott to make the Jenolan flight-worthy. They discover the same port the Enterprise found and surmise the Enterprise is trapped inside. La Forge and Scott manage to open the portal without being pulled in and then wedge the Jenolan in the open portal, using its shields to keep it open while the Enterprise escapes, rescuing the two engineers from the Jenolan just before destroying it with photon torpedoes.

As the Enterprise returns to its mission, the crew of the ship give Scott a shuttlecraft "on extended loan" to either continue to his retirement or to explore the galaxy. Scott thanks the crew and reminds La Forge to make the most of his time as the Chief Engineer of the Enterprise before he departs.

== Production ==
The initial shot when Scotty's holodeck re-creation of his Enterprise is shown, was taken from the original series episode "This Side of Paradise", composited into this episode via blue screen. The part of the bridge where Scotty and Picard have their conversation was built new; the command chair and helm console were provided by a fan, Steve Horch, who originally built them for use at Star Trek conventions.

The exterior shots of the spacecraft USS Jenolan were of a modified model of a shuttlecraft that had appeared in the theatrical film Star Trek VI: The Undiscovered Country in 1991. That model was made by Industrial Light & Magic, and this shuttle was the basis for the Runabout space shuttle featured in Star Trek: Deep Space Nine (aired 1993–1999).

The "Aldebaran whisky" used in this episode was made using the real beverage Hi-C Ecto Cooler, which was produced to promote The Real Ghostbusters.

== Reception ==
In a 2003 interview, Freeman Dyson – who did not take his "Dyson sphere" thought experiment seriously – stated that upon watching the episode that, he found the science behind the story was "nonsense", but from a TV viewer's perspective he generally enjoyed it.

In 2016, marking the 50th anniversary of the first ever episode in the Star Trek franchise, "Relics" received high recognition within the body of 725 episodes, over 30 seasons, of the then-aired six television series in the franchise, The Hollywood Reporter ranked it the 62nd best Star Trek television episode of the first 50 years, impressed by what they called a "great script" from Ronald D. Moore, backed by good acting performances from actors James Doohan and Levar Burton. At that same time, and also including the then-aired 13 films in franchise history, Radio Times rated Scotty's scene – on the holodeck recreation of USS Enterprise (NCC-1701) (as Scotty says, "no bloody A, B, C or D") – as the 18th greatest scene in all Star Trek, with Doohan "poignantly playing Scotty as a man who feared he'd outlived his usefulness".

In 2017, Variety ranked this the 14th best episode of Star Trek: The Next Generation.

In 2019, The Hollywood Reporter listed this among the 25 best episodes of Star Trek: The Next Generation.

In 2019, Den of Geek ranked this the fourth best morality play within the body of 744 episodes (as of Star Trek: Short Treks's season 1 episode "The Escape Artist"), over 32 seasons, of the then-aired eight television series in the franchise.

In a 2022 interview, J. D. Payne and Patrick McKay revealed that the mysterious subplot of "Relics" surrounding Scotty inspired the story they had conceived for the unproduced fourth Star Trek film in J.J. Abrams' rebooted Star Trek film series.

== Releases ==
The episode was released as part of the Star Trek: The Next Generation season six DVD box set in the United States on December 3, 2002. A further DVD release came as part of The Best of Star Trek: The Next Generation – Volume 2 on November 17, 2009, in the United States, with "Tapestry", "Cause and Effect", and "The Inner Light".

A remastered HD version was released on Blu-ray optical disc, on June 24, 2014.

== Novelization ==
In author Michael Jan Friedman's novelization of the episode, he expands upon the holodeck scene, recreating The Original Series bridge crew from their youthful heyday, which was originally in the episode script, but was cut from the final production, as it would have been too expensive to film. He also adds some backstory to Scotty's trip on the transport ship, including interaction between Scotty and Franklin, the crew member who is also stuck in the transporter prior to the crash into the Dyson sphere. He also adds a subplot where an away team beams down onto the originally "habitable" interior surface of the Dyson sphere.

In the audiobook adaptation, also by Friedman, the scene on the holodeck occurs as in the television episode and the original Enterprise's bridge crew do not appear.

The novelization of this episode was published by Pocket Books; it was one of five novelizations to be made of The Next Generation episodes, alongside "Encounter at Farpoint", "Unification", "Descent", and "All Good Things...".

=== Follow-up ===
- The Star Trek: The Next Generation novel Dyson Sphere by George Zebrowski and Charles R. Pellegrino was published in April 1999. It is a follow-up to the episode.
