= Timescape (Star Trek: The Next Generation) =

- Star Trek: The Next Generation episode
- Episode no.: Season 6 Episode 25
- Directed by: Adam Nimoy
- Written by: Brannon Braga
- Production code: 251
- Original air date: June 14, 1993

Guest appearances
- Patricia Tallman - Romulan; Michael Bofshever - Male alien; John DeMita - Romulan; Joel Fredericks - Engineer

Episode chronology
← Previous "Second Chances"	Next → "Descent"
- Star Trek: The Next Generation season 6

"Timescape" is the 151st episode of the American science fiction television series Star Trek: The Next Generation, and the 25th episode of the sixth season.

Set in the 24th century, the series follows the adventures of the Starfleet crew of the Federation starship Enterprise-D. In this episode, Captain Picard, Counselor Troi, Chief Engineer La Forge and Lt. Commander Data must save the Enterprise, which they find frozen in time, exploding, and taking weapons fire from an also-frozen Romulan Warbird.

This episode features a Danube-Class runabout, which is larger than an average Starfleet shuttle but not as big as the larger starships. It also includes special effect shots of a Romulan Warbird, which appeared throughout Star Trek: The Next Generation.

== Plot ==
Captain Picard, Counselor Troi, Chief Engineer La Forge, and Lt. Commander Data are on a runabout, returning to the Enterprise from a conference. As they near the ship, they encounter pockets of temporal disruptions that have very peculiar effects and could be lethal if they pass through them. They modify their sensors to avoid these and they find the Enterprise and a Romulan warbird frozen in time. The warbird has fired a disruptor at the Enterprise, which had initiated a power transfer to the warbird.

Data and La Forge modify a set of emergency transport armbands to nullify the temporal effects, and Picard, Data and Troi transport aboard the Enterprise to investigate. The crew has been transporting Romulans aboard from the warbird, one of whom has fired on Dr. Crusher with his disruptor. The Enterprise warp engine has suffered a warp breach which, under normal circumstances, would consume the ship in seconds. Picard suffers "temporal narcosis" from standing close to the core breach, forcing them to return to the runabout, and La Forge takes Picard's place. On the warbird, they find the crew attempting to evacuate the ship with the Enterprise's help; its main reactor, which uses an artificial quantum singularity, is undergoing a power surge. Investigating the engine closely, they find the singularity appearing odd and discolored. When Data scans it with a tricorder, time briefly moves forward on the ship (causing a cataclysmic core explosion), but then reverses back to its original point (restoring ships and crews). La Forge spots a Romulan who was not in the same place as before; the Romulan suddenly touches him, shocking them both. The shock is nearly lethal to La Forge, and they disconnect the shield to freeze him in time, hoping to care for him later, while they take the Romulan back to the runabout.

There, they find the Romulan is really a creature from trans-dimensional space. He admits that he and a companion were trying to recover the singularity from the Romulans—their young were accidentally placed there to incubate instead of in a natural singularity such as a black hole. In the process of trying to remove the singularity, they had created a power surge, and the Warbird sent out a distress call to the Enterprise. The creature soon fades away, returning to its own trans-dimensional space.

Picard, Troi, and Data return to the Enterprise. Data readies a remote-controlled tricorder aimed at the Romulan engine core to reverse time a few seconds so he can perform actions to prevent the pending disasters. After the warp core breach is averted in Engineering, Data is about to stop the power transfer, but is attacked by the trans-dimensional creature's companion. He regains consciousness shortly thereafter, but must put a force field around the warp core to prevent it from breaching again.

Picard suddenly appears on the Enterprise bridge near Riker. The crew is surprised, but Picard orders them to continue to evacuate the Romulan ship, including La Forge, and to terminate the power transfer. In sickbay, Troi successfully pushes Dr. Crusher out of the way of the Romulan disruptor blast; the Romulan states he was firing at a trans-dimensional creature that had disguised herself as a Romulan and had not meant to harm Crusher. However, the warbird continues to go critical, and the power transfer from the Enterprise cannot be stopped. Picard remotely powers the runabout into the power transfer beam's path, disrupting it and allowing the Enterprise to move away, after safely recovering the warbird crew. Just as the warbird's engines go critical, the ship disappears, along with the remaining time abnormalities. As the Enterprise crew repair the ship, Picard promises to return the Romulans safely to their homeworld. At the close, Data is trying to examine human perception of time.

== Production ==
The fictional large shuttle spacecraft design, known as the Danube-class runabout, was created primarily by Herman Zimmerman, Rick Sternbach and Jim Martin in the 1990s for Star Trek: Deep Space Nine (DS9) and used throughout the franchise, including in books, comics, and games.

The set for the runabout's aft living quarters was built for this episode of The Next Generation, which was running concurrently with DS9's first season. The set was designed by Richard James, and was funded from The Next Generation's budget in order to take pressure off DS9's finances. Design and fabrication of the aft set had to be completed in nine days. This was the only television appearance of the Danube class outside of DS9 during this period, and although the set was intended for use on DS9 it was never used again to depict a runabout's interior.

The other spacecraft were developed previously. Andrew Probert designed the Romulan warbird for season one of The Next Generation and also designed the exteriors of many other space vehicles seen in the first year of the show, including the USS Enterprise (NCC-1701-D).

== Reception ==
In 2017, Medium rated this the 12th best time-travel episode of Star Trek, and noted an opening scene that includes a bowl of fruit decaying in rapid speed. Also in 2017, Popular Mechanics said that "Timescape" was one of the top ten most fun episodes of Star Trek: The Next Generation, noting how they must explore two spaceships seemingly locked in battle but frozen in time.

In 2017, Business Insider listed "Timescape" as one of the most underrated episodes of the Star Trek franchise at that time.

The Romulan Warbird, known in-universe as the D'deridex-class, was featured on the show between 1987 and 1994; in 2017, Space.com rated it the 9th greatest spacecraft of the Star Trek franchise.

In 2020, GameSpot noted this episode as one of the most bizarre moments of the series, when Picard makes a smiley face in the warp core breach, noting it as a "funny, yet unsettling moment".

== Releases ==
The episode was released as part of the Star Trek: The Next Generation season six DVD box set in the United States on December 3, 2002. A remastered HD version was released on Blu-ray optical disc, on June 24, 2014.

"Timescape" and "Descent, Part I" were released on a LaserDisc on November 17, 1998, in the USA.
