= True Q =

- Star Trek: The Next Generation episode
- Episode no.: Season 6 Episode 6
- Directed by: Robert Scheerer
- Written by: René Echevarria
- Story by: Matthew Corey (idea)
- Cinematography by: Jonathan West
- Production code: 232
- Original air date: October 26, 1992

Guest appearances
- John de Lancie - Q; Olivia d'Abo - Amanda Rogers; John P. Connolly - Orn Lote

Episode chronology
← Previous "Schisms"	Next → "Rascals"
- Star Trek: The Next Generation season 6

"True Q" is the 132nd episode of the American syndicated science fiction television series Star Trek: The Next Generation, the sixth episode of the sixth season, first aired November 1, 1992.

Set in the 24th century, the series follows the adventures of the Starfleet crew of the Federation starship Enterprise-D. In this episode, a young woman coming aboard evidences superhuman abilities while being investigated by Q, who claims she belongs with the Q Continuum.

== Plot ==
The Federation starship Enterprise brings aboard a young Starfleet intern, Amanda Rogers, who plans to study biological sciences under Dr. Crusher. The crew soon finds that Amanda has unusual abilities. She redirects a falling cargo crate to avoid injury to Commander Riker and contains a sudden explosion of the warp core. Q appears and reveals that Amanda is actually a member of the Q Continuum, having been conceived by two other Q when they opted to take on human forms and hide their Q-enabled abilities. Q has arrived to teach Amanda how to harness her powers, as well as to decide whether to return her to the Q Continuum, or let her remain living a normal human life.

Captain Picard, suspicious of Q's motives, orders Lt. Commander Data to investigate Amanda's parents. He finds that they died from a freak tornado in their Kansas home, something that would be nearly impossible with Earth's weather modification network. When confronted about this, Q reveals that the Continuum had Amanda's parents killed when they were living as humans in mortal form. Q admits his true intentions: to determine if Amanda is truly a Q, or if she is a Q-human hybrid, in which case he has orders to destroy her. Picard argues with Q about the morality of his decision, while Q points out the responsibility that the Continuum has to govern their omnipotent powers and the people who use them (Amanda could accidentally destroy the entire galaxy). Eventually Q tells Picard not to worry, that he's decided Amanda is Q, and as such she has a choice: either to return to the Continuum, or she can choose to live as a human, but if she does she must voluntarily suppress her powers and not use them. Q warns Amanda that it won't be as easy as she thinks, revealing that her parents were given this choice but were unable to resist using their powers, resulting in their execution by the Continuum as punishment.

As Amanda contemplates her choice, the ship receives a distress call from a nearby planet where their ionic anti-pollution systems are failing rapidly, which would flood the atmosphere and block out the sun. The Enterprise crew races to help the inhabitants, but cannot keep up with the failures. Q taunts Amanda that should she not join the Continuum, it would be very difficult to resist the urges in using her powers in cases such as this. Amanda makes her choice and uses her abilities to restore the planet's atmosphere to normal, saving its inhabitants. Q prepares to take Amanda to the Q Continuum, but she demands time to explain her new situation to her adoptive parents and to say goodbye to the crew, fearing that she will not see them again, particularly Dr. Crusher, who reminds her that as part of the Q Continuum, she can do anything she wants.

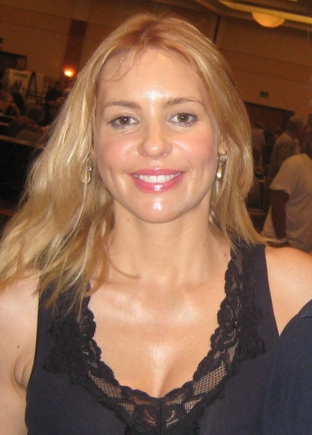
Guest star Olivia d'Abo played Amanda Rogers.

== Releases ==
The episode was released as part of the Star Trek: The Next Generation season six DVD box set in the United States on December 3, 2002. A remastered HD version was released on Blu-ray optical disc, on June 24, 2014.

On May 5, 1998, this episode was released on LaserDisc in the United States, paired with "Schisms" on a 12-inch double-sided optical disc.
