= Schisms (Star Trek: The Next Generation) =

- Star Trek: The Next Generation episode
- Episode no.: Season 6 Episode 5
- Directed by: Robert Wiemer
- Story by: Jean Lousie Matthias; Ron Wilkerson
- Teleplay by: Brannon Braga
- Production code: 231
- Original air date: October 19, 1992

Guest appearances
- Lanei Chapman - Sariel Rager; Ken Thorley - Mot; Angelina Fiordellisi - Kaminer; Scott T. Trost - Lieutenant Shipley; Angelo McCabe - Crewman; John Nelson - Medical Technician; Majel Barrett - Computer Voice

Episode chronology
← Previous "Relics"	Next → "True Q"
- Star Trek: The Next Generation season 6

"Schisms" is the 131st episode of the American science fiction television series Star Trek: The Next Generation and the fifth of the sixth season. It was originally aired on October 19, 1992.

Set in the 24th century, the series follows the adventures of the Starfleet crew of the Federation starship Enterprise-D. In this episode, some members of the crew are having trouble sleeping and experience unnerving reactions to particular objects for unknown reasons and decide to investigate it.

== Plot summary ==
Several of the Enterprise crew members are having difficulty sleeping or have lost track of time and find themselves having strange emotional responses to normal objects. The affected crew realize they have had common experiences and, with Counselor Deanna Troi's help, use the holodeck to reconstruct and refine their fragmented memories and impressions of the events. Their collaboration results in a device resembling an operating table in a dark room filled with mysterious noises. They come to the conclusion that they have been to a similar place.

Dr. Beverly Crusher examines them, finding evidence of sedation as well as subtle changes to their bodies, such as a microscopic misalignment of the bones in Commander William Riker's arm, indicating it has been severed and then reattached. They realize they are being abducted from the ship to be experimented on. When they wonder if this is happening to other crew members as well, they ask the ship's computer to list missing members and find that two other crew members are missing. One soon reappears in his cabin but dies shortly after he is found, his blood having been transformed into a liquid polymer.

Chief Engineer Geordi La Forge and Lt. Commander Data also discover particle emissions in one of the cargo bays, creating an expanding subspace rift which threatens to breach the hull. They devise a method to counter the emissions and close the rift but they need a way to trace the emissions to the source. Commander Riker volunteers, as he has been taken several nights in a row. Dr. Crusher injects him with a stimulant intended to counteract the sedative his captors are using and he carries a tracking device which can be detected from the Enterprise when he is taken. Riker is taken that night and finds himself in a strange environment on an operating table, near the other missing crew member, surrounded by busy aliens.

The rift continues to expand and Captain Jean-Luc Picard orders Geordi to begin the attempt to close it. Riker pretends to be unconscious until the aliens are distracted by the rift which had begun to fluctuate. He frees himself, picks up the other crew member and jumps through the rift which had become large enough for them to pass through. They appear in the cargo bay moments before the rift is forced shut. The aliens manage to send a brief energy pulse through at the last second, which disappears through the Enterprise hull and into space. Data wonders if the pulse is a probe sent by the aliens attempting to communicate with the Enterprise but Riker, noting their methods which resulted in the death of one of the crew, suspects their motives are less benign.

== Reception ==
In 2012, Tor.com reviewed "Schisms", and highlighted the "Ode to Spot" poem in the opening. They rated the episode 4 out of 10. Unrealitymag.com rated "Schisms" as one of the top 10 re-watchable episodes of television in general, praising it as "creepy" but also noting some fun scenes. In 2017, Heroes & Icons noted this episode as one featuring scary or eerie Star Trek content. In 2021, ScreenRant ranked "Schisms" the number one scariest episode of all Star Trek franchise television episodes.

== Releases ==
The episode was released as part of the Star Trek: The Next Generation season six DVD box set in the United States on December 3, 2002. A remastered HD version was released on Blu-ray optical disc, on June 24, 2014.

On May 5, 1998 this episode was released on LaserDisc in the United States, paired with "True Q".

== See also ==
- Alien abduction
