= Suspicions (Star Trek: The Next Generation) =

- Star Trek: The Next Generation episode
- Episode no.: Season 6 Episode 22
- Directed by: Cliff Bole
- Written by: Joe Menosky; Naren Shankar
- Cinematography by: Jonathan West
- Production code: 248
- Original air date: May 9, 1993

Guest appearances
- Patti Yasutake - Alyssa Ogawa; Tricia O'Neil - Kurak; Peter Slutsker - Reyga; James Horan - Jo'Bril; John S. Ragin - Christopher; Joan Stuart Morris as T'Pan; Whoopi Goldberg - Guinan; Majel Barrett - Computer Voice

Episode chronology
← Previous "Frame of Mind"	Next → "Rightful Heir"
- Star Trek: The Next Generation season 6

"Suspicions" is the 148th episode of the syndicated American science fiction television series Star Trek: The Next Generation, the 22nd episode of the sixth season.

Set in the 24th century, the series follows the adventures of the Starfleet crew of the Federation starship Enterprise-D. In this episode, relieved of duty and facing a court martial, Dr. Beverly Crusher (Gates McFadden) tells of her support of a Ferengi scientist (Peter Slutsker) and the trouble that ensued from an applied test of his theory.

This episode aired in broadcast syndication the week of May 8, 1993.

== Plot ==
Guinan (Whoopi Goldberg) visits Dr. Beverly Crusher (Gates McFadden) in her quarters, complaining of "tennis elbow". Crusher breaks the news that she is no longer a doctor on the Enterprise and will be facing a court martial. She tells Guinan the whole story.

A Ferengi scientist, Dr. Reyga (Peter Slutsker), has created a metaphasic shielding technique, but racial profiling and his unorthodox methods have left most scientists in the field ignoring his work. Dr. Crusher decides to play the role of a "scientific diplomat" and invite other scientists versed in the field to come to the Enterprise and view a demonstration of the doctor's prototype. As they are all skeptical, they decide that someone other than the Ferengi should pilot the shuttle outfitted with the shielding. Jo'Bril (James Horan), a Takaran, volunteers.

At the test flight, they all watch from the bridge as Jo'Bril enters the star. Everything seems to be going as planned until suddenly Jo'Bril becomes short of breath, and barely pilots the shuttle out of the star before dying. Everyone considers Reyga a failure, but he cannot accept that something went wrong. No one can find any trouble with the shuttlecraft. Also, Dr. Crusher cannot determine the cause of Jo'Bril's death. In fact, she cannot understand his physiology at all, especially why his cells seem to be decaying at such a slow rate. However, he is judged dead. Reyga pleads with the other scientists to allow him a second test. Dr. Crusher reluctantly refuses, but Reyga seems determined to prove himself. A few hours later, he is found dead due to a plasma discharge. It is judged a suicide by Security Chief Lt. Worf (Michael Dorn), but Crusher intuitively knows it was neither a suicide nor an accident.

Dr. Crusher discusses how unusual this seems with Captain Jean-Luc Picard (Patrick Stewart). She is determined to perform an autopsy, but the captain informs her that it is out of the question, as the family insists the body not be desecrated before they can perform the Ferengi death ritual. Frustrated, Dr. Crusher decides to perform an investigation. She confronts Christopher (John S. Ragin) and T'Pan (Joan Stuart Morris), and Christopher becomes incensed. Eventually, he mentions that Kurak (Tricia O'Neil) and Reyga had a fiery argument. Dr. Crusher then confronts the Klingon scientist, much to her own peril. As she determines Kurak also did not murder Reyga, she is stymied and her confidence falters. Knowing she will be disobeying a direct order, she performs an autopsy on Reyga, and finds nothing. She informs Picard, who is forced to relieve her of duty.

In the present, Guinan encourages her to continue her investigation, as she has nothing left to lose. Commander William Riker (Jonathan Frakes) warns her not to do anything "foolish". Despite this, Crusher takes Dr. Reyga's shuttle into the star herself. Picard urges her to come back, but to no avail. In the shuttle, Crusher discovers that the shields work just as Jo'Bril emerges alive. He reveals his species can fake death. He also plans to fake the destruction of the shuttle and take it back to his homeworld. He plans to profit from the new shielding, turning it into a weapon. Jo'Bril attacks Crusher, but she fights back and is forced to completely vaporize him.

She returns to the ship, relieved to have vindicated Reyga, and unafraid of any court martial, she replicates a tennis racket for Guinan so she would never get tennis elbow again – but Guinan admits she has never played tennis; she was merely trying to figure out what was wrong with Crusher.

== Reception ==
In 2011, The A.V. Club gave this episode a "B−", and noting it as a Beverly Crusher focused episode.

The book Star Trek FAQ 2.0 (Unofficial and Unauthorized): Everything Left to Know About the Next Generation, the Movies and Beyond (2013) said this was a "credible whodunnit", and a showcase for Gates McFadden as Doctor Crusher.

== Releases ==
The episode was released as part of the Star Trek: The Next Generation season six DVD box set in the United States on December 3, 2002. A remastered HD version was released on Blu-ray optical disc, on June 24, 2014, with DTS-HD MA 7.1 audio.

On November 3, 1999 this was released on LaserDisc in the United States, paired with "Frame of Mind" on one double sided 12 inch disc. The two episodes together had a runtime of 93 minutes, and it had a Dolby Surround audio track.
