= Aquiel =

- Star Trek: The Next Generation episode
- Episode no.: Season 6 Episode 13
- Directed by: Cliff Bole
- Story by: Jeri Taylor
- Teleplay by: Brannon Braga; Ronald D. Moore
- Production code: 239
- Original air date: February 1, 1993

Guest appearances
- Renée Jones - Aquiel Uhnari; Wayne Grace - Torak; Reg E. Cathey - Morag; Majel Barrett - Computer Voice

Episode chronology
← Previous "Ship in a Bottle"	Next → "Face of the Enemy"
- Star Trek: The Next Generation season 6

"Aquiel" is the 139th episode of the American science fiction television series Star Trek: The Next Generation, the 13th episode of the sixth season.

Set in the 24th century, the series follows the adventures of the Starfleet crew of the Federation starship Enterprise-D. In this episode, the crew of the Enterprise investigates a mysterious death on a remote station, and Commander La Forge falls for the main suspect.

This episode was written by Jeri Taylor, Brannon Braga, and Ronald D. Moore. It was directed by Cliff Bole, and aired on television on February 1, 1993.

== Plot ==
The Federation starship Enterprise arrives at a subspace communications relay station near the Klingon border on a resupply mission. However, when an away team boards the relay there is no sign of the two officers assigned there. Lieutenant Aquiel Uhnari, Lieutenant Rocha, and the station's shuttlecraft are missing. While searching the station, the away team finds the dog that belongs to Lieutenant Uhnari. The away team also finds a substance on the floor, which Enterprise Chief Medical Officer Dr. Crusher determines is a type of cellular residue.

The crew uncover evidence that a Klingon had been on the station leading Crusher and First Officer Riker to suspect that Uhnari and Rocha were the victims of a Klingon attack. Commander La Forge backs up this theory when he examines Uhnari's personal logs. He finds an entry in which Aquiel relays her fears to her sister Shianna about a Klingon named Morag. Captain Picard contacts the local Klingon governor, Torak, and learns that Morag is commander of one of the Klingon ships that patrols that section of the Klingon Empire's border. At this point, Torak refuses to cooperate further. Picard threatens to take his case to Chancellor Gowron, a threat scoffed at by Torak until Picard casually mentions that he served as Gowron's Arbiter of Succession. (Note: See the episodes "Reunion" and "Redemption".) Knowing Gowron would be in Picard's debt and how the former might frown upon the disrespect shown to the latter, a nervous Torak agrees to cooperate fully.

The senior staff meets with Torak, and he produces Aquiel alive. She explains that Rocha attacked her and that her last memory was escaping from him. She doesn't remember precisely what happened. To help clarify what really occurred, Picard requests to speak to Commander Morag, the Klingon who was allegedly harassing the station. Attracted to her, La Forge befriends Aquiel, and takes her to the Ten-Forward lounge. He reveals to her that he surveyed her logs and personal correspondence as part of their investigation. Aquiel says she didn't like Rocha but did not wish to hurt him. She realizes she is a suspect in his death.

Meanwhile, Dr. Crusher continues to examine the cellular residue found on the deckplate. Riker and Lt. Worf, who are examining the shuttlecraft, come across a phaser set to kill. La Forge gives moral support to Aquiel as she is questioned again.

Commander Morag then arrives aboard the Enterprise and meets the senior staff. He admits that he was present on the station, and that he took priority Starfleet messages from its computer. La Forge returns to the station and discovers that Rocha's personal log has been tampered with. He confronts Aquiel who admits deleting messages from Rocha's log, because Rocha, as the senior officer, was going to declare her insubordinate and belligerent to Starfleet. Scared that this new evidence will condemn her as Rocha's killer, she agrees to stay aboard the Enterprise because La Forge has faith in her. He and Aquiel use an ancient method of her people to bond and share their thoughts.

While Dr. Crusher examines the DNA found on the deck plate yet again, the material moves and touches her hand. It then withdraws and forms a perfect replica of her hand. Due to this, she suspects that the real Rocha might have been killed by this strange coalescent organism, and a replica of him then attacked Aquiel in search of a new body. It is presumed that the organism is now Aquiel or Morag, as they were the only two people who were aboard the station after Rocha's disappearance. Worf takes a security team to secure Morag, while Riker returns to the outpost and stops the ritual Aquiel is conducting with La Forge, believing she was about to attack him.

With Aquiel and Morag in the brig, the Enterprise proceeds to the nearest starbase as the crew keep a close watch on them both - in case the organism needs a new body soon. La Forge is in his quarters along with Aquiel's dog reminiscing about her. The dog transforms and attacks him, but he is able to kill it. Later, he explains to Aquiel, who has been released, that Rocha was replaced by the organism. When it attacked her, it began the takeover process (hence her lapse in memory); however, she managed to get away in time. The creature then turned to the only other life form on the station, her dog.

The episode ends with Aquiel and La Forge in Ten-Forward, where she turns down his offer to help her join the Enterprise crew. She tells him she wants to earn her way there on her own merits.

== Reception ==
In 2019, Screen Rant ranked it the ninth worst episode of Star Trek: The Next Generation based on IMDB ratings, which was 6.1 out of ten at that time. They were critical of the Klingon subplot, and described Geordi as “pathetic at best and a sexual predator at worst“.

== Releases ==
The episode was released as part of the Star Trek: The Next Generation season six DVD box set in the United States on December 3, 2002. A remastered HD version was released on Blu-ray optical disc, on June 24, 2014.
