= René Echevarria =

American screenwriter and producer

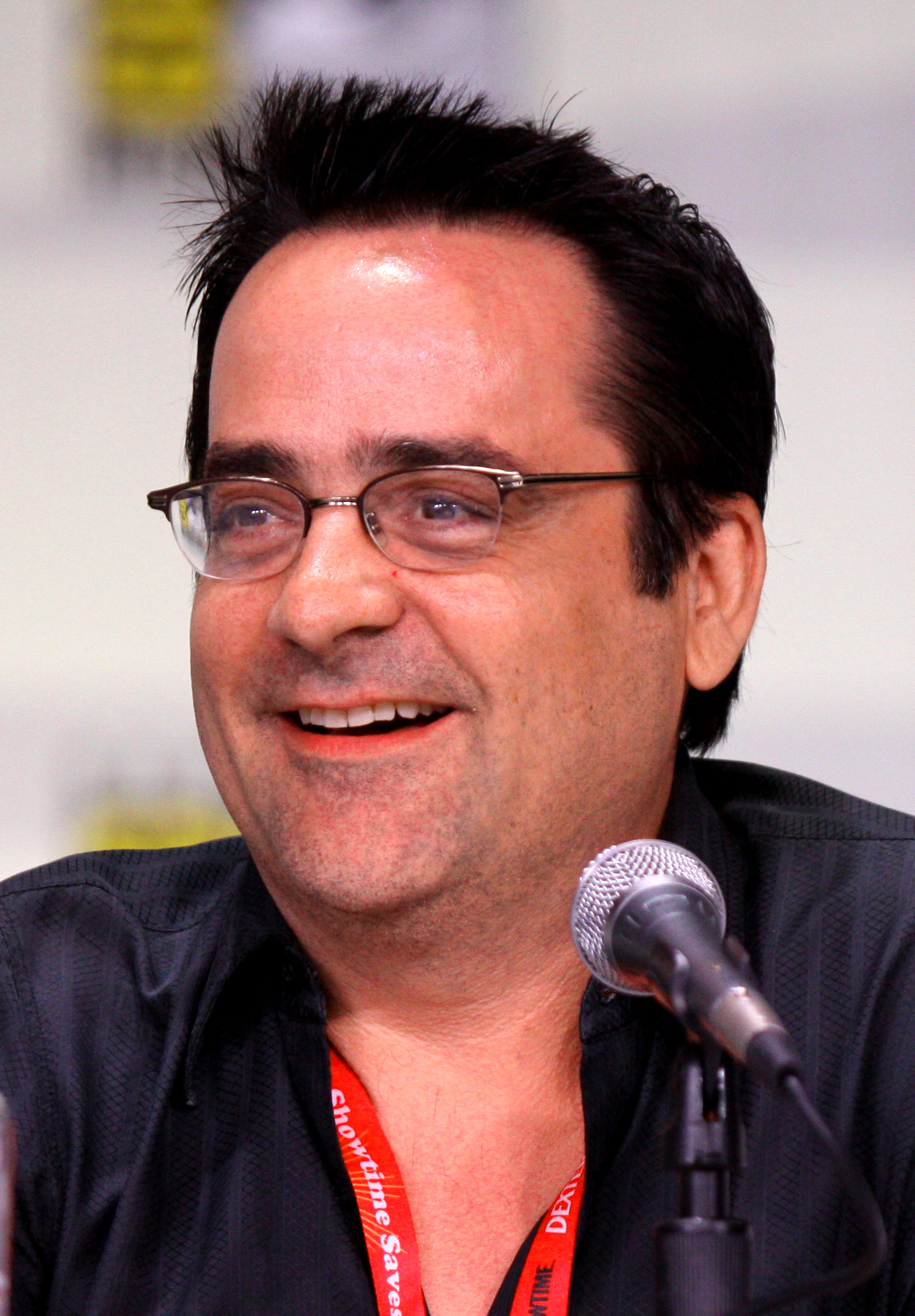
- Born: St. Petersburg, Florida, U.S.
- Education: Duke University
- Occupations: Screenwriter and producer
- Years active: 1990–present

René Echevarria is an American screenwriter and producer. He has worked on a number of television series, including Star Trek: The Next Generation, Dark Angel and Castle. He created The 4400 for USA Network, Carnival Row for Amazon, and was showrunner on Terra Nova.

== Early life, family and education ==
René Echevarria was born in St. Petersburg, Florida. He has a Cuban-American background. He attended St. Petersburg Catholic High School.

Before attending university, he was expecting to follow his father into medicine. However, while attending Duke University, he joined a production of The Real Inspector Hound and decided to go into the theatrical arts. He graduated from Duke in 1984, having majored in history.

== Career ==
=== Early years ===
After graduating college, Echevarria travelled to New York to start work in theatre. He started work at the Circle Repertory Company, and became assistant director on a production of a play, Darts. He also appeared in plays, including some productions at the La MaMa Experimental Theatre Club and the Chelsea Theater Center. He travelled to the UK with a production of the play Prepared, which was performed both at the World's End Theatre and at the Edinburgh Film Festival.

=== Screenwriter ===
Echevarria's first screenwriting credit came after he submitted an unsolicited script to the science fiction series Star Trek: The Next Generation. After re-writes by both Echevarria and the writing team on the show, this became the episode "The Offspring". He was hired to redraft "Transfigurations" and was subsequently hired as a writer on the series. During his time working on the series, he wrote over 30 episodes. Following this, he began writing for fellow Star Trek series, Star Trek: Deep Space Nine. One of the episodes he co-wrote with Ronald D. Moore, "Trials and Tribble-ations", was nominated for the Hugo Award for Best Dramatic Presentation. Following Star Trek, he worked on a series of television shows including Now and Again, Castle, Dark Angel and Medium.

=== Producer ===
Echevarria created The 4400 alongside Scott Peters for USA Network. He was reunited with one of his colleagues from Deep Space Nine, as Ira Steven Behr was one of the producers on the series. Echevarria was also involved in the development of the Teen Wolf television series for MTV, where he remained on the series as an executive producer.

Echevarria was working as the show runner on ABC's television adaptation of the film True Lies, when he was asked to take over production duties on the pilot of Terra Nova. This followed the termination of four writers and another producer, amid a series of other issues with the production. The production cost $14 million, and suffered from a three-month delay, and Echevarria and fellow producer Brannon Braga both denied that there was a deliberate axing of staff, attributing it to the movement of the production to Australia. Echevarria subsequently signed a full-time deal with 20th Century Fox Television, the studio behind Terra Nova, as show runner for the television series, and was involved in the promotion of the show.

In February 2013, he joined the team on television series Intelligence as executive producer and show runner. He left the series during the following July, in a split which was described as amicable. In July 2014, he signed a two-script deal with Legendary Television to develop new series from the back catalogue of the studio.
