= List of Star Trek: Picard characters =

Star Trek: Picard is an American television series created by Akiva Goldsman, Michael Chabon, Kirsten Beyer, and Alex Kurtzman for the streaming service CBS All Access (later rebranded as Paramount+). It is the eighth Star Trek series and was released from 2020 to 2023 as part of Kurtzman's expanded Star Trek Universe. The series focuses on retired Starfleet Admiral Jean-Luc Picard. It begins at the end of the 24th century, 20 years after the character's last appearance in the film Star Trek: Nemesis (2002).

Patrick Stewart stars as Picard, reprising his role from the series Star Trek: The Next Generation (1987–1994) as well as other Star Trek media. Alison Pill, Isa Briones, Harry Treadaway, Michelle Hurd, Santiago Cabrera, and Evan Evagora also star in the first season, with Jeri Ryan, Orla Brady, and Brent Spiner joining for the second. The third season stars Stewart, Ryan, Hurd, and Ed Speleers, with Next Generation cast members LeVar Burton, Michael Dorn, Jonathan Frakes, Gates McFadden, Marina Sirtis, and Spiner as special guest stars.

This list includes the main cast of Picard, guest stars with recurring roles, and other noteworthy guests.

== Cast overview ==
This section includes cast members who appeared in main or recurring roles:

- A green cell indicates the actor is a main cast member.
- A red cell indicates the actor is a recurring guest star.
- A blue cell indicates the actor is a guest star.
- A yellow cell indicates the actor made an uncredited cameo appearance.

Star Trek: Picard main cast
Actor	Character	Appearances		
Actor	Character	Season 1	Season 2	Season 3
Patrick Stewart	Jean-Luc Picard	Main	Main	Main
Alison Pill	Agnes Jurati (Note: Agnes Jurati merges with the Borg Queen to become a new character, also played by Alison Pill, in the second season.)	Main	Main	
Isa Briones	Dahj and Soji Asha (Note: Isa Briones portrays Dahj in the series premiere, her sister Soji for the rest of the first season as well as the second-season premiere, and their predecessor Sutra in the two-part season one finale.)	Main	Main	
Isa Briones	Kore Soong		Main	
Harry Treadaway	Narek	Main		
Michelle Hurd	Raffi Musiker	Main	Main	Main
Santiago Cabrera	Chris Rios	Main	Main	
Evan Evagora	Elnor	Main	Main	
Jeri Ryan	Seven of Nine	Recurring	Main	Main
Orla Brady	Laris	Recurring	Main	Guest
Orla Brady	Tallinn		Main	
Brent Spiner	Data (Note: Brent Spiner also plays Altan Inigo Soong in the first and third seasons, and Data's evil twin Lore in the third season.)	Recurring		Recurring
Brent Spiner	Adam Soong		Main	
Ed Speleers	Jack Crusher			Main

Star Trek: Picard recurring cast
Actor	Character	Appearances		
Actor	Character	Season 1	Season 2	Season 3
Jamie McShane	Zhaban	Recurring		
Sumalee Montano	Mom AI	Recurring		
Tamlyn Tomita	Oh	Recurring		
Peyton List	Narissa	Recurring		
Jonathan Del Arco	Hugh	Recurring		
Rebecca Wisocky	Ramdha	Recurring		
Jonathan Frakes	William Riker	Guest		Recurring
Marina Sirtis	Deanna Troi	Guest		Recurring
John de Lancie	Q		Recurring	Cameo
Madeline Wise	Yvette Picard		Recurring	
Annie Wersching	Borg Queen		Recurring	Guest (Note: A different version of the Borg Queen appears in the third season, voiced by Alice Krige.)
Sol Rodríguez	Teresa Ramirez		Recurring	
Ito Aghayere	Guinan		Recurring (Note: Whoopi Goldberg has a guest role in the second season as the older version of Guinan.)	
Penelope Mitchell	Renée Picard		Recurring	
Gates McFadden	Beverly Crusher			Recurring
Todd Stashwick	Liam Shaw			Recurring
Ashlei Sharpe Chestnut	Sidney La Forge			Recurring
Michael Dorn	Worf			Recurring
Amanda Plummer	Vadic			Recurring
LeVar Burton	Geordi La Forge			Recurring
Mica Burton	Alandra La Forge			Recurring

== Main characters ==
=== Jean-Luc Picard ===
Jean-Luc Picard (portrayed by Patrick Stewart) is a retired Starfleet admiral and former captain of its flagship vessel USS Enterprise. Stewart was reprising his role from Star Trek: The Next Generation and subsequent television series and movies by August 4, 2018. In the series, Picard has been retired from Starfleet for 14 years, living in his chateau in France, until he meets Dahj and goes on his personal mission to find and to protect her sister. He has a brain condition that is terminal. At the end of the first season, he dies from his brain anomaly, but his consciousness is transferred into a new synthetic "golem" body that Soong had prepared.

=== Agnes Jurati ===
Agnes Jurati (portrayed by Alison Pill) is a doctor working for the Daystrom Institute's Division of Advanced Synthetic Research in Okinawa who was recruited by Dr. Bruce Maddox. She hopes to interact with an actual synth. After being subject to a Vulcan mind meld by Commodore Oh where she sees the atrocities from the Admonition, she is ordered to join Picard's crew to kill the synth as well as Maddox, who was also her lover. She also ingests a tracker that allows Oh and Narek to track the La Sirena.

=== Soji Asha ===
Dahj and Soji Asha (portrayed by Isa Briones) are the twin android daughters of the late Lieutenant Commander Data. In the opening episode, Dahj asks Picard to help her find out why she is being attacked—and why she is able to defend herself so well. She is destroyed before his eyes. Meanwhile, Soji has been working on a Borg cube known as the "Artifact", now in the hands of Romulans, where she helps to reclaim victims of the Borg. Briones also portrays Sutra, an android on her home planet Coppelius, created by Bruce Maddox and Altan Inigo Soong. Sutra's twin, Jana, was killed prior to the series' events when she and another synth named Flower were the envoys to make first contact with USS Ibn Majid.

=== Narek ===
Narek (portrayed by Harry Treadaway) is a Romulan at the Artifact Borg cube, spying on Soji Asha for the Zhat Vash. At the beginning of the series, he befriends and becomes Soji's lover as part of his cover. In the episode "The Impossible Box", he guides Soji through a Zhal Makh meditation exercise so that she reveals the whereabouts of her home world, and then betrays her. He then pursues Rios's ship, eventually following it to Soji's home world Coppelius. Although he is captured, he is freed by Sutra and returns to the Artifact. He works a deal with Rios to try to infiltrate the synth base and disable their newly built beacon. Picard showrunner Michael Chabon said there was originally a scene where Narek was taken into custody by the Federation but it was dropped during the editing of the episode finale.

=== Raffi Musiker ===
Rafaella "Raffi" Musiker (portrayed by Michelle Hurd) is a former Starfleet intelligence officer struggling with substance abuse who served as Picard's first officer during the Romulan evacuation. When she joins Picard's crew, she handles communications and is able to get clearances so Picard and friends can land on the planet. At Freecloud, she meets her son, who is married with an expectant child, but he rejects her attempt at reconciliation. She begins a relationship with Seven at the end of season 1 and rejoins Starfleet before season 2.

=== Chris Rios ===
Cristóbal "Chris" Rios (portrayed by Santiago Cabrera) is a former Starfleet officer, now owner and pilot of La Sirena. He is also a skilled thief. Picard has hired his services on Raffi's recommendation. Cabrera also plays Rios's ship's 5 holograms, each with their own area of expertise in servicing the ship and its crew. He left Starfleet because of what happened on the USS Ibn Majid; he returns to Starfleet before season 2

=== Elnor ===
Elnor (portrayed by Evan Evagora) is a Romulan refugee, who was relocated from Picard's efforts 14 years prior. He is an expert in hand-to-hand combat and is fiercely loyal to Picard. He was raised from a young boy by the sisters of the Quat Milat. Because of their core tenet of absolute candor, he is trained never to lie. In the first season, he pledges to support Picard, and then briefly supports Hugh when Picard and Soji escape from the Artifact. He joins Starfleet Academy and is a cadet in season 2. Elnor as a child 14 years prior is portrayed by Ian Nunney.

== Star Trek franchise characters ==
The actors from the Star Trek franchise who have made appearances in the series. Some of the major ones are billed as special guest stars.

- Data (portrayed by Brent Spiner) is a sentient android who served under Picard as Second Officer and Chief Operations Officer aboard the Enterprise, until he sacrificed himself to save Picard in Star Trek: Nemesis. Picard sees Data in his dreams in "Remembrance", and in a quantum simulation in the season 1 finale episode "Et in Arcadia Ego, Part 2".
- Bruce Maddox (portrayed by John Ales) is a cybernetics doctor and once the Chair of Robotics at the Daystrom Institute on Earth. He and Dr. Agnes Jurati developed a technique to create twin androids from a single positronic neuron of another android. Earlier in his career, while serving in Starfleet, he failed in an attempt to have Data declared non-sentient and mere property in order to take him from the Enterprise to study and advance his research. Brian Brophy previously played the character in the Star Trek: The Next Generation episode "The Measure of a Man".
- Hugh (portrayed by Jonathan Del Arco) is a former Borg drone who appeared in the Next Generation episodes "I, Borg" and "Descent, Part II". He has since become the executive director of the Borg Reclamation Project.
- Seven of Nine (portrayed by Jeri Ryan) is a former Borg drone liberated from the Collective by Captain Kathryn Janeway and the crew of the USS Voyager. Ryan was a regular on Star Trek: Voyager seasons four through seven. She is part of a group called the Fenris Rangers that helps people in need. She is upgraded to main cast in season 2 where she is in a relationship with Raffi and is Captain of La Sirena.
- William Riker (portrayed by Jonathan Frakes) is a retired Starfleet Captain of the USS Titan and formerly Picard's first officer on the Enterprise. He and Troi married at the beginning of Star Trek: Nemesis. Riker appears with Troi in "Nepenthe" and by himself in "Et in Arcadia Ego, Part 2".
- Deanna Troi (portrayed by Marina Sirtis) is former counselor on the Enterprise, she and Riker married at the beginning of Star Trek: Nemesis. Troi appears with Riker in "Nepenthe".
- Icheb (portrayed by Casey King) - Seven of Nine's surrogate son who appeared on Star Trek: Voyager and appears in "Stardust City Rag".
- Altan Inigo Soong (portrayed by Brent Spiner), is a scientist and the biological son of Noonien Soong, a research partner of Bruce Maddox, who resides on Coppelius as a surrogate father to the synthetics living there.
- Q (portrayed by John de Lancie), a member of the Q Continuum who appeared in season 2.
- The Borg Queen (portrayed by Annie Wersching) is the de facto leader of the Borg Collective who first appeared in Star Trek: First Contact, and was a recurring antagonist in the later seasons of Star Trek: Voyager. She has a major role in season 2.
- Wesley Crusher (portrayed by Wil Wheaton) is a Traveler and a former member of the Enterprise-D crew. He makes a cameo appearance in the season 2 finale Farewell, offering Kore Soong the chance to join the Travelers.

== Recurring characters ==
Series original characters introduced in season 1

- Laris (portrayed by Orla Brady) is a Romulan and a former member of the Tal Shiar. Laris manages Picard's vineyard and household in France.
- Zhaban (portrayed by Jamie McShane), a Romulan and former member of the Tal Shiar. He acts as Picard's butler at his estate in France.
- Soji's mother (portrayed by Sumalee Montano), a woman who appears on the video calls, claiming to be Soji and Dahj's mother.
- Narissa (portrayed by Peyton List), Narek's sister, a Romulan spy and member of the Zhat Vash. She is posing as Lieutenant Rizzo, a human operative of Starfleet Security on the Borg Cube.
- Commodore Oh (portrayed by Tamlyn Tomita), a Vulcan Starfleet officer and head of Starfleet Security, but secretly a half-Romulan operative of the Zhat Vash and Rizzo's contact in the Federation.
- Ramdha (portrayed by Rebecca Wisocky), a Romulan who was previously assimilated by the Borg. She is placed in the mental ward of the Artifact Borg cube. She realizes Soji is one of the twin sisters as predicted by her cards, and calls her the Destroyer. In "Broken Pieces", it is revealed that she was a member of the Zhat Vash sisterhood with Oh and Narissa. She had gone mad from seeing the Admonition. She was the guardian of Narek and Narissa, the latter of whom refers to her as their aunt.
