= Star Trek: Picard season 1 =

American television series season

Star Trek: Picard
- Season 1
- Promotional poster
- Showrunner: Michael Chabon
- Starring: Patrick Stewart; Alison Pill; Isa Briones; Harry Treadaway; Michelle Hurd; Santiago Cabrera; Evan Evagora
- No. of episodes: 10

Release
- Original network: CBS All Access
- Original release: January 23 – March 26, 2020

Season chronology
- Next → Season 2

The first season of the American television series Star Trek: Picard features the character Jean-Luc Picard after he retired from Starfleet following the destruction of the planet Romulus. Living on his family's vineyard in 2399, Picard is drawn into a new adventure when he is visited by the daughter of android lieutenant commander Data. The season was produced by CBS Television Studios in association with Secret Hideout, Weed Road Pictures, Escapist Fare, and Roddenberry Entertainment, with Michael Chabon serving as showrunner.

Patrick Stewart stars as Picard, reprising his role from the series Star Trek: The Next Generation as well as other Star Trek media. Alison Pill, Isa Briones, Harry Treadaway, Michelle Hurd, Santiago Cabrera, and Evan Evagora also star. Stewart announced the series in August 2018, after being convinced to return to the role by creators Akiva Goldsman, Chabon, Kirsten Beyer, and Alex Kurtzman. Chabon was named sole showrunner ahead of filming, which took place from April to September 2019 in California. The producers focused on differentiating the season from previous franchise installments and rehabilitating the Romulan and Borg species. The story and setting take inspiration from the political landscape of Brexit and Donald Trump, as well as the Syrian refugee crisis. The season features special guest stars reprising their roles from The Next Generation and other Star Trek media.

The season premiered on the streaming service CBS All Access on January 23, 2020, and ran for 10 episodes through March 26. It was released to new viewership records for the service and generally positive reviews from critics who highlighted Stewart's performance and the focus on character over action. However, they criticized the season's slow pace and complex story, and its darker tone than previous Star Trek series was controversial with critics and franchise fans alike. The season won a Primetime Creative Arts Emmy Awards for its Prosthetic Makeup, and received several other awards and nominations. A second and third season were ordered in January 2020, before the first season's debut.

== Episodes ==
No. overall	No. in season	Title	Directed by	Written by	Original release date
1	1	"Remembrance"	Hanelle M. Culpepper	Teleplay by : Akiva Goldsman and James Duff; Story by : Akiva Goldsman & Michael Chabon & Kirsten Beyer & Alex Kurtzman and James Duff	January 23, 2020
In an interview, retired Starfleet Admiral Jean-Luc Picard reveals that he resigned in protest after Starfleet abandoned plans to rescue Romulan citizens from a supernova when rogue synthetics attacked the rescue fleet. Starfleet banned the creation of synthetics after the attack. Romulan assassins attack a young woman named Dahj and kill her partner. This triggers something in Dahj, and she is able to kill the assassins. Experiencing visions of Picard and seeing his interview, Dahj seeks him out. After meeting her, Picard visits Starfleet Archives and finds a painting that features a figure who resembles Dahj. Entitled "Daughter", the painting was given to Picard by his android former lieutenant commander Data. More assassins attack Picard and Dahj, and Dahj is killed. Picard meets with Dr. Agnes Jurati at the Daystrom Institute, who explains that Dahj could be Data's daughter via an experimental procedure known as fractal neuronic cloning, which results in twin androids with organic bodies. Meanwhile, Dahj's twin, Soji Asha, is working in a Borg Cube that has been reclaimed by Romulan refugees.
2	2	"Maps and Legends"	Hanelle M. Culpepper	Michael Chabon & Akiva Goldsman	January 30, 2020
Hoping to find Soji before the assassins get to her, Picard investigates Dahj's apartment with his Romulan employee Laris. The latter believes the assassins may be members of the Zhat Vash, a secretive organization with a deep-rooted hatred of synthetics, and helps Picard discover Soji's location from Dahj's computer. On the Borg Cube, called the "Artifact", Soji develops a relationship with Romulan agent Narek while she works on a project to remove Borg technology from former Borg drones. Despite the onset of a terminal illness, Picard asks Starfleet Admiral Kirsten Clancy for a ship and crew to find Soji. She refuses him and refers the incident to Starfleet's security chief Commodore Oh, who discusses it with a lieutenant who is Narek's sister Narissa in disguise. Narissa led the assassins to kill Dahj while Narek is approaching his target, Soji, with seduction rather than violence. Picard decides to find and save Soji himself and begins to assemble a new crew, starting with his former Starfleet first officer Raffi Musiker.
3	3	"The End Is the Beginning"	Hanelle M. Culpepper	Michael Chabon & James Duff	February 6, 2020
When Picard resigned following the synth attack on Mars, Starfleet fired Raffi. Now she resents him for that, and for not helping her in the subsequent years, and refuses to join him. However, she does find him a freelance pilot named Rios. On the Artifact, the reclamation project's director, the former Borg drone Hugh, allows Soji to interview a Romulan that has been reclaimed from the Borg. This Romulan declares Soji to be "the destroyer" and tries to kill herself, but Soji unknowingly uses her enhanced speed to stop this from happening. Narissa warns Narek not to get emotionally attached to Soji. Oh approaches Dr. Jurati, who reveals her discussion with Picard. Shortly after this, Picard is attacked by Zhat Vash operatives. Jurati helps kill all of them but one, who also calls Soji "the destroyer" before committing suicide. Picard agrees to take Jurati on his mission to find Soji, and the pair transport aboard Rios's ship La Sirena. There they are also joined by Raffi, who believes that Soji's creator Bruce Maddox is on the planet Freecloud and will travel with them that far.
4	4	"Absolute Candor"	Jonathan Frakes	Michael Chabon	February 13, 2020
Picard asks Rios to make a detour to the planet Vashti, where he helped relocate Romulan refugees before the attack on Mars. Picard had befriended a young boy named Elnor and promised to return for him, but abandoned the boy after he resigned from Starfleet. Elnor was then raised by the Qowat Milat, warrior nuns who have sworn an oath of absolute candor. Picard asks Elnor to join his quest; Elnor initially refuses, but changes his mind when Picard is attacked by Romulans who resent Starfleet for abandoning the evacuation effort. Picard and Elnor beam up to La Sirena, where Rios and Raffi are fighting with a local warlord. A mystery ship helps La Sirena win the battle but is damaged in the process. They beam the pilot, former Borg drone Seven of Nine, to La Sirena. On the Artifact, Soji tries to learn more about the Romulans that were assimilated by the Artifact and their prophesied "destroyer". Narek offers to get her information on the Romulans, but the pair have a falling out when he expresses doubt about Soji's past. Narissa gives Narek one week to get information on other synths from Soji.
5	5	"Stardust City Rag"	Jonathan Frakes	Kirsten Beyer	February 20, 2020
Years ago, Seven of Nine was forced to euthanize her adopted son, Icheb, after his Borg implants were ripped out by black market dealer Bjayzl. Now, Seven travels with La Sirena to Freecloud, where Raffi learns that Bjayzl has Maddox captive and intends to sell him to the Romulans. To free Maddox, Picard's crew stage a prisoner exchange with Seven as the bait. Meanwhile, Raffi unsuccessfully tries to reconnect with her estranged son Gabriel before returning to La Sirena. When Bjayzl recognizes Seven, the latter drops the charade and reveals her true intention: to kill Bjayzl and avenge Icheb. Picard convinces Seven not to seek revenge, and Maddox is safely beamed to La Sirena. Later, Seven returns to Freecloud and kills Bjayzl without Picard's knowledge. In the La Sirena sickbay, Maddox tells Picard that he sent Soji and Dahj to the Artifact and Earth, respectively, in order to discover the true motivation behind the Starfleet synth ban. Once left alone by Picard, Jurati confronts Maddox and discusses the fact that they used to secretly be in a relationship together. Jurati then murders Maddox.
6	6	"The Impossible Box"	Maja Vrvilo	Nick Zayas	February 27, 2020
Narek realizes that Soji has the same nightmare each night, and plans to use this to find where she was created. Struggling with the guilt of murdering Maddox, Jurati has sex with Rios. To board the Artifact without causing a diplomatic incident with the Romulans, Picard asks Raffi to procure official clearance from the Federation. Raffi, drunk and high following her son's rejection, convinces an old Starfleet acquaintance to provide the clearance. This allows Picard to beam aboard the Artifact and reconnect with Hugh. Due to Narek's manipulation, Soji begins to discover that her identity was recently manufactured, and he guides her through the Romulan meditation practice of Zhal Makh to explore her dreams: she is able to identify clues hinting at the place she was created. Narek tells Soji that she is not real, and attempts to poison her with radiation. This activates her self-defense mechanism which allows her to survive. Soji runs into Picard, and Hugh helps them transport to the nearby planet Nepenthe. Elnor beams aboard the Artifact to help Hugh cover their tracks.
7	7	"Nepenthe"	Doug Aarniokoski	Samantha Humphrey and Michael Chabon	March 5, 2020
When Jurati was approached by Oh, the latter used a Vulcan mind meld to reveal the horrifying potential consequences of allowing synthetic life like Soji to exist. Jurati agreed to help destroy her, and ingested a tracking device. Narek now uses that to track La Sirena until a guilt-ridden Jurati takes an injection that places her in a coma and stops the tracking. Elnor's attempts to protect Hugh on the Artifact are unsuccessful when Narissa fatally wounds Hugh. Before dying, Hugh gives Elnor a device to signal Seven of Nine's vigilante group, the Fenris Rangers. On Nepenthe, Picard reunites with his old friends and colleagues William Riker and Deanna Troi, whose son Thad died after the medical procedure he required was banned as part of the synthetic ban. Riker, Troi, and their daughter Kestra give shelter to Picard and Soji until La Sirena arrives. Troi and Riker can see Soji's pain following Narek's betrayal, and help Picard begin to earn her trust. The family also try to help Soji come to terms with being an android, and are able to help identify the location from her dream.
8	8	"Broken Pieces"	Maja Vrvilo	Michael Chabon	March 12, 2020
Picard and Soji beam aboard La Sirena, and Rios has a panic attack when he sees Soji. When Jurati wakes up she offers to turn herself over to Starfleet, and after meeting Soji she chooses not to harm her. Rios tells Raffi about his Starfleet captain, who murdered two people on Starfleet's orders before committing suicide. Raffi also pieces together that the Romulans discovered a warning from a past civilization about the horrors of evolved synthetic life, and the Zhat Vash sent the half-Romulan Oh to infiltrate Starfleet and instigate the Mars attack as part of their anti-synth plan. The people Rios's captain murdered were synths from Soji's homeworld, and one of them, Jana, looked just like her. Hearing this activates memories for Soji and she plots a course for her home, still followed by Narek. On the Artifact, Seven of Nine arrives to help Elnor fight the Romulans. She connects with the Cube and the Borg drones that are in stasis on it, but the Romulans kill all of the drones by releasing them into space. The Romulans then abandon the Artifact and prepare to invade the synth world.
9	9	"Et in Arcadia Ego"	Akiva Goldsman	Teleplay by : Michael Chabon & Ayelet Waldman; Story by : Michael Chabon & Ayelet Waldman & Akiva Goldsman	March 19, 2020
10	10	"Et in Arcadia Ego"	Akiva Goldsman	Teleplay by : Michael Chabon; Story by : Michael Chabon & Akiva Goldsman	March 26, 2020
Part 1: Using a Borg transwarp conduit, La Sirena arrives at Soji's homeworld, Coppelius, several days before the Romulan fleet. Narek arrives and attacks, but is interrupted when the Artifact follows them through the transwarp conduit as well. A planetary defense system in the form of giant orchids drags the three ships to the planet's surface, and Picard requires medical attention following the crash. Jurati discovers his terminal illness, and Picard reveals it to the rest of the crew. After finding Elnor and Seven alive in the wreckage of the Artifact, the crew travels to the settlement where Dahj and Soji were created. They find Maddox's partner (and the son of Data's creator) Altan Inigo Soong with a colony of synths, including Jana's twin Sutra. Sutra uses a mind meld to see the vision Oh showed Jurati, and believes that it is a message to synthetic life from higher beings willing to destroy organic life. Soong, Soji, and the other synths support Sutra's plan to call these beings before the Romulans arrive. Picard disagrees, and is taken prisoner. Part 2: Narek convinces Raffi, Rios, and Elnor to help him destroy the synths' beacon. Jurati frees Picard and the pair escape to La Sirena, which Picard flies to confront and stall the Romulans. Narissa targets La Sirena with the Artifact's defenses, but is stopped and killed by Seven of Nine. Soong discovers that Sutra worked with Narek to convince the other synths to agree with her plan, and he incapacitates her. Soji foils the attempt to destroy the beacon, and activates it. Picard begins to succumb to his illness, but Jurati prolongs his life long enough for him to distract the Romulans until a Starfleet armada arrives in support, led by Riker. This gives Soji the choice to turn the beacon off herself, which she does, and the Romulans retreat. Picard dies after Jurati and Soong transfer his consciousness into a device holding Maddox's copy of Data's consciousness. Picard says goodbye to Data before awaking in a synthetic "golem" body. After the Federation lifts the ban on synths, Picard and Soji set off in La Sirena with Rios, Raffi, Jurati, Elnor, and Seven of Nine.

== Cast and characters ==
=== Main ===
- Patrick Stewart as Jean-Luc Picard
- Alison Pill as Agnes Jurati
- Isa Briones as Dahj, Soji Asha and Sutra
- Harry Treadaway as Narek
- Michelle Hurd as Raffi Musiker
- Santiago Cabrera as Chris Rios
- Evan Evagora as Elnor

=== Recurring ===
- Brent Spiner as Data and Altan Inigo Soong
- Orla Brady as Laris
- Jamie McShane as Zhaban
- Sumalee Montano as Dahj and Soji's "mother"
- Tamlyn Tomita as Commodore Oh
- Peyton List as Narissa
- Jonathan Del Arco as Hugh
- Rebecca Wisocky as Ramdha
- Jeri Ryan as Seven of Nine

=== Notable guests ===
- John Ales as Bruce Maddox
- Casey King as Icheb
- Jonathan Frakes as William Riker
- Marina Sirtis as Deanna Troi

== Production ==
=== Development ===
In June 2018, after becoming sole showrunner of the series Star Trek: Discovery, Alex Kurtzman signed a five-year overall deal with CBS Television Studios to expand the Star Trek franchise beyond Discovery to several new series, miniseries, and animated series. One of these new series was reported to star Patrick Stewart, reprising his role of Jean-Luc Picard from the series Star Trek: The Next Generation. Stewart had previously said that he did not want to return to the franchise, but was convinced to join the project after a pitch by Kurtzman, Akiva Goldsman, Michael Chabon, and Kirsten Beyer. Stewart officially announced the series in August 2018, and revealed in January 2019 that the first season would consist of 10 episodes. Kurtzman said the series did not have a traditional showrunner and was instead being "shepherded" by a larger creative team, including himself, Goldsman, Chabon, and Beyer, but in June CBS named Chabon as the sole showrunner of the series. This decision was made by Kurtzman and CBS ahead of filming and despite Chabon's lack of production experience (his background is in writing novels rather than television series). Chabon worked closely with Kurtzman and Goldsman on day-to-day production of the season.

=== Writing ===
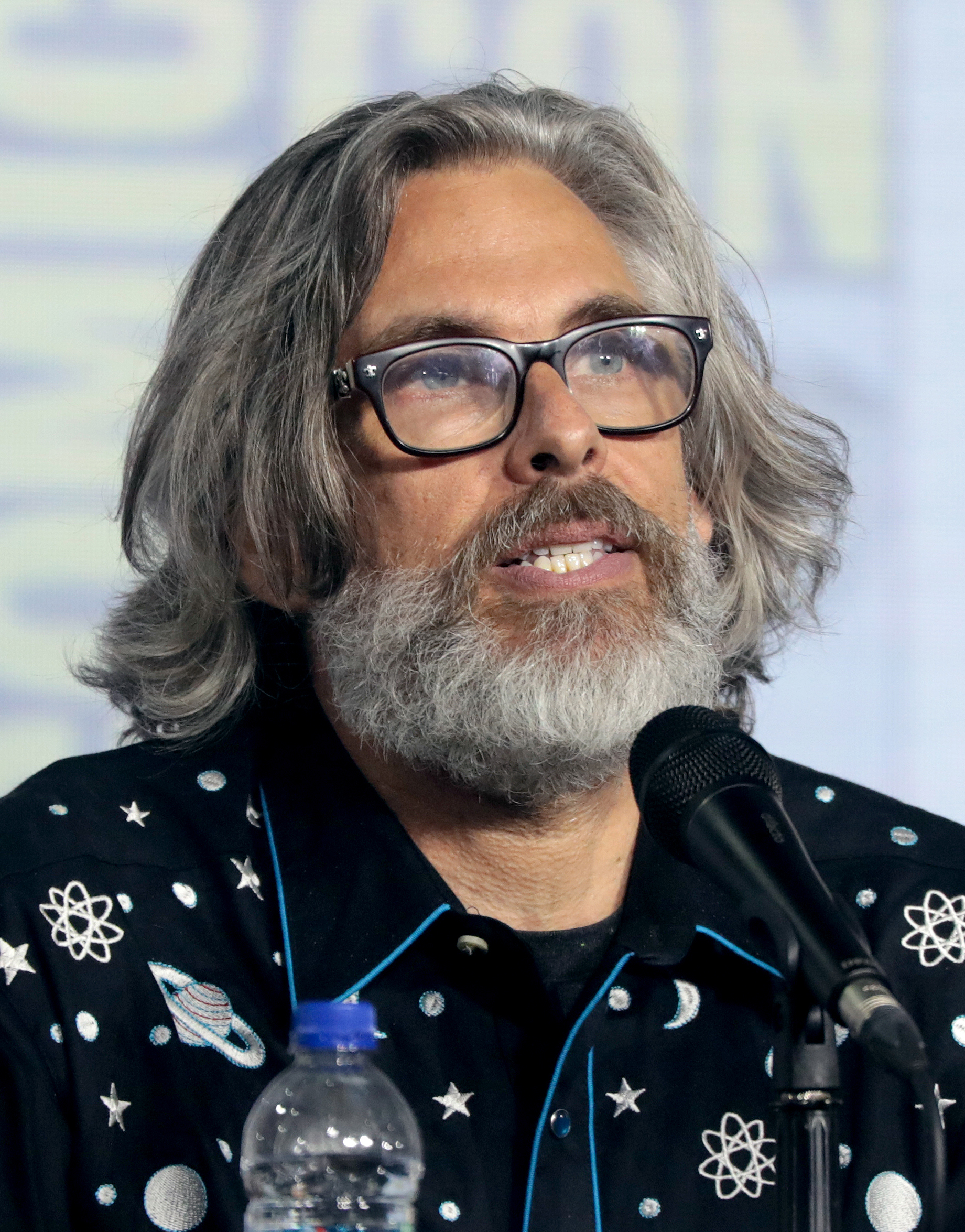
Co-creator Michael Chabon served as showrunner for the first season of Picard

The creators began writing the series by the end of September 2018, working alongside Stewart for two weeks. Chabon said Stewart's input was priceless, with the actor discussing his memories of the character, what he wanted to see in the series, and what acting challenges he wanted to face and avoid. They created the overall plot for the season, before expanding to a full writers room to break the episodes and write scripts. The stories for eight episodes were broken by December, and all scripts for the season were completed by August 2019. Chabon re-wrote most of the other writers' scripts to ensure consistency of tone, and found the collaborative writing process to be the biggest difference between his work on Picard and the shorts series Star Trek: Short Treks. Chabon also compared Picard to his work on the film John Carter (2012), for which he felt constrained by having to adapt the source material. In contrast, writing Picard allowed him to expand the franchise in new directions. Chabon wanted the series to focus on a retired Picard's life on his vineyard, potentially solving local mysteries, with no spaceships or gun fights. He acknowledged that the Star Trek fandom was probably not prepared for such a radical departure, and he had to balance these ideas with a more plot-driven approach.

The series tells a single serialized story, beginning 20 years after Stewart's last appearance as Picard in the film Star Trek: Nemesis (2002). It finds Picard deeply affected by the death of his android colleague Data in Nemesis, which Chabon and Goldsman felt had ended Data's character arc prematurely. They wanted to complete his journey with the first season of Picard, and it ends with Picard saying goodbye to the consciousness of Data before allowing him to "die" for good. Chabon began writing this scene early in development and did not complete it until the night before it was filmed. The season introduces new androids derived from Data's consciousness, referred to as synthetic beings or "synths". In the series' backstory, synths have been banned, and Picard fights for their right to exist. He gives his life to save the synths, and his consciousness is transferred into a synthetic body which the writer felt made him the "living embodiment" of the theme. This storyline builds off a terminal illness that Picard is diagnosed with in the season; since Picard is 94 years old, the writers had wanted to discuss relatable issues like this that people face at the end of their lives. Chabon unintentionally incorporated his personal experiences into this storyline after his father died during the making of the season.

The series takes place following the destruction of the planet Romulus as seen in the film Star Trek (2009), and reveals that Starfleet has abandoned the Romulans. Stewart wanted the series to depict the Federation as more isolationist than it was in The Next Generation to acknowledge the politics of Brexit and the election of Donald Trump. He felt that The Next Generation was "too perfect and too protected ... a safe world of respect and communication and care" that did not reflect the real world. Chabon wanted to rehabilitate the Romulans in a similar way to how The Next Generation rehabilitated the Klingons by "open[ing] them up a little bit beyond the mustache twirling". This meant explaining why the species is so secretive and revealing a distrust that they have for synthetic life. Beyer, a long-time Star Trek writer and novelist, believed that the season's explanation for the Romulans' secrecy did not contradict the species' previous appearances in the franchise. Chabon wrote many pages of mythology about the Romulans as background for the season's story, including a history for the newly introduced Qowat Milat, a sect of warrior nuns. The season depicts many Romulans as refugees using imagery reminiscent of the Syrian refugee crisis, which Kurtzman said would be a difficult subject to approach if he was not confident in Chabon's writing. Initial director Hanelle Culpepper compared the Romulans to Muslims in the way that "the actions of a few can drive people to stereotype the whole bunch".

Stewart was reluctant to include the Borg in the series due to not wanting to repeat stories from The Next Generation, but was convinced by the "very unique" story that the writers wanted to tell with the group. Chabon had first questioned the franchise's antagonistic portrayal of the Borg while watching the film Star Trek: First Contact (1996), believing that it was wrong for Starfleet to treat them as less-than-human when Picard had already been shown to have regained his humanity after being assimilated by the Borg and becoming Locutus of Borg in The Next Generation. Because of this, the season depicts the Borg as victims, focusing on former Borg drones that have had their implants removed and are now trying to regain their former identities. Picard eventually visits a Borg Cube in the season and is forced to face the trauma of his time as Locutus of Borg, which is backstory that Chabon thought could not be ignored by Picard. When doing research for his role in the series as a former Borg drone and protector of a group of other former Borg drones, guest star Jonathan Del Arco listened to hours of interviews with Holocaust survivors, researched the psychology of abuse survivors, and drew on his own experience of having friends die during the AIDS crisis.

=== Casting ===
Patrick Stewart stars as Jean-Luc Picard, which he confirmed when announcing the series. The rest of the cast was hired in March and April 2019: Alison Pill as Agnes Jurati, Isa Briones as Dahj and Soji Asha, Evan Evagora as Elnor, Michelle Hurd as Raffi Musiker, Santiago Cabrera as Cristobal "Chris" Rios, and Harry Treadaway as Narek. In the two-part season finale, Briones is revealed to also be portraying Sutra, an older model of android with a similar appearance to the twin androids Dahj and Soji.

In April 2019, several of Stewart's co-stars from The Next Generation, including Wil Wheaton, Jonathan Frakes, Brent Spiner, Gates McFadden, and Marina Sirtis, were asked whether they would reprise their roles for Picard. McFadden said she had not been contacted about it, while Sirtis said the group did not know anything about the series. That July, Spiner, Frakes, and Sirtis were revealed to be reprising their roles in the first season, respectively as Data, William Riker, and Deanna Troi. Also announced as returning were Jonathan Del Arco as Hugh, a guest star from The Next Generation, and Jeri Ryan as Seven of Nine, a regular cast member on Star Trek: Voyager. Despite Seven of Nine never meeting Picard in the franchise before, the writers felt that she was the perfect character to include in the series due to her being a former Borg drone like Picard.

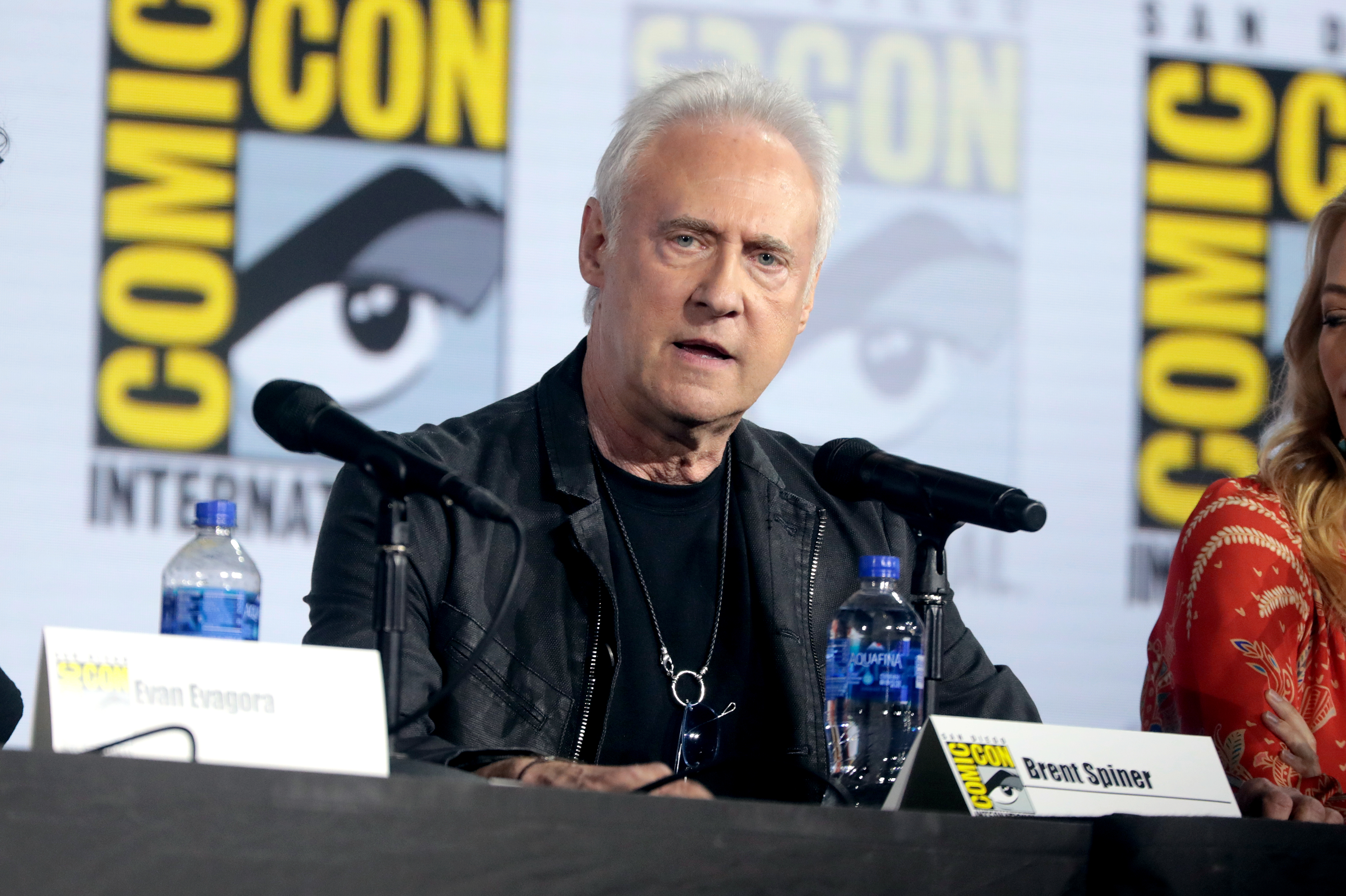
Brent Spiner reprises his Star Trek role of Data for the last time in the season, and also portrays the new character Altan Inigo Soong

In January 2020, Kurtzman and Stewart explained that the writers did not want to "just throw people in" to the series because they had been in The Next Generation. Spiner was included after it became clear that Data would be important to Picard in the series, and Frakes and Sirtis were added halfway through the season when the writers came up with a story idea that required them. In addition to returning as Data, Spiner also portrays Altan Inigo Soong, the son of Data's creator Noonien Soong whom Spiner also portrayed in The Next Generation. In March 2020, Spiner said the season was a "gentle sendoff" and fitting end to Data's story, and would be the last time he reprised that role.

To establish the changes in Picard's life since the end of The Next Generation, the writers decided to have several Romulan characters working for Picard that may have been depicted as enemies in previous series. These include Orla Brady as Laris and Jamie McShane as Zhaban. Picard also has a dog named "Number One", portrayed by a dog named Dinero. Stewart felt that giving Picard a dog would, "without any dialogue or any dramatic reference, [say] a lot about this man, that he now has a dog always at his side". As an advocate for pit bulls, Stewart insisted that Number One be a member of the breed. Chabon and Culpepper explained that Dinero was a rescue dog and was not a good actor, so he was left out of some scenes that he was originally going to be included in. Chabon felt they were able to get a good performance from the dog for the scenes that he does appear in.

Also recurring throughout the season are Sumalee Montano as an artificial intelligence that Dahj and Soji believe is their mother; Tamlyn Tomita as the half-Vulcan, half-Romulan Commodore Oh; Rebecca Wisocky as Ramdha, a Romulan who was assimilated by the Borg; and Peyton List as Narek's sister Narissa. List's performance was influenced by Narek and Narissa being originally written as both siblings and lovers, though the writers moved away from this, and her role was expanded after she impressed during early table reads. Additionally, two new actors take on existing Star Trek characters: John Ales portrays Bruce Maddox, taking over from The Next Generation guest star Brian Brophy; and Casey King appears as Icheb, who was portrayed by Manu Intiraymi in Voyager.

=== Design ===
==== Costumes ====
When first approaching the costumes for the series, Christine Bieselin Clark looked at costumes from throughout Star Trek as research. Clark wanted to humanize Picard and show more vulnerability through his clothing. She acknowledged that he comes from a "lifetime of service and structure and order" and his clothes should reflect that, but she also wanted to depict him as a "very fit and active and viable older man" while showing the changes in his character since The Next Generation. An example of the latter comes in the episode "Absolute Candor", which begins with a flashback to Picard's time in Starfleet where he is seen arriving on the planet Vashti in a white suit with his Starfleet badge. This is contrasted later in the episode when he returns to the planet in rugged, darker clothing that matches the changes in his personality and in the state of the universe.

At the beginning of the season, the costumes seen at Chateau Picard are supposed to feel warm and familiar rather than futuristic, since it should be a place that the audience wants to return to once the adventure begins. The costumes include some asymmetry to acknowledge the time period, but this is kept subtle to not distract from the intended emotions of the setting. On La Sirena, the suggestion is that the replicators that create clothing on the starship are limited to its darker color palette and geometric designs which is why all the character's costumes on the starship reflect its own design. Clark still tried to reflect the personality of each character in subtle ways, such as having Jurati's costume look awkward while Raffi's is sleek. Clark was able to create "loud, fun outfits" for the planet Freecloud, taking inspiration from bioluminescent jellyfish for the character Bjayzl.

Clark designed two sets of Starfleet uniforms for Picard: one for the series present time period, and one for the flashback to when Picard retired from Starfleet. She said this was an especial challenge due to the history of the franchise and its costumes, and started her work on the uniforms by looking at the designs for Starfleet from throughout the franchise and creating a timeline of the evolving costumes. She then moved forward from those designs to create the new uniforms. Clark wanted the present day uniforms to have a "severity of lines", focusing on blocks of color, geometry, and simple shapes. In contrast, the uniforms from the flashback are more elegant, with the shapes and lines having "fluidity". Clark highlighted that the flashback is the first time that Picard is shown to be an admiral in the franchise, and she wanted to have a "grand" uniform for Stewart to wear.

For returning characters such as Troi and Riker, Clark intended for their costumes to be an evolution of their Next Generation costumes, wanting to maintain consistency with the main colors of their costumes across the two series. Clark chose to move away from Seven of Nine's "classic silver catsuit" costume from Star Trek: Voyager, deciding to reflect the character's physical strength rather than her sexuality while also acknowledging her Robin Hood-like role in Picard as a member of vigilante group the Fenris Rangers.

==== Props ====
The series' prop master, Jeff Lombardi, began designing different props while Stewart was still in London and sent different designs to the actor to help choose which direction the designs should go. This allowed Lombardi to create the props and have them ready when Stewart arrived on set knowing the actor was already happy with the designs. This included tea cups, watches, badges, and a cane that incorporates a telescope into its handle. Lombardi was given freedom to develop different weapons that looked more advanced than those in previous series, and included new modifications that the writers could then include in action sequences where possible. These weapons were first created in 2D mock-ups to get the sizing correct for the actors and stunt department, before being created for real using 3D printing technology. Artist Andrea Dopaso painted the oil painting named "Daughter" that is created by Data in the series, before Briones was cast. Dopaso had a week to "plug her into it" once the actress joined the series.

For the new Starfleet badges, Lombardi began by looking at the designs done for episodes of Star Trek: Voyager that visited a similar time-period to Picard. These included a ribbon shape beneath the traditional delta, and Lombardi refined this look to get the new badge design. The new badges were created out of real metal so they would "pop" like real chrome objects do on screen. Picard is also seen wearing the Starfleet badge from Nemesis, and when at Chateau Picard he wears a pin featuring the Picard family crest which doubles as a communicator like the Starfleet badges do. The season also introduces what appears to be Romulan tarot cards which are revealed to be playing cards for the game zhamaq. For the episode "Nepenthe", the prop department was able to develop and portray the personality of Thad, the deceased child of Riker and Troi, by dressing his bedroom set with props that revealed his character and backstory. These included maps of fictional places and breakdowns of new languages that Thad created himself.

An early challenge for the prop department on the series was the scene in which the disembodied parts of B-4, a failed copy of the android Data, are displayed in a drawer. Lombardi wanted to use the original props from Star Trek: Nemesis which had already aged the required number of years to match the in-universe time difference, but these had been auctioned off and "scattered across the world" years earlier along with numerous other props from the franchise. John Van Citters, the vice president of Star Trek brand management at CBS Studios, helped Lombardi find the owners of the original B-4 parts. They found B-4's head in Calgary and his torso in Hong Kong. The rest of B-4's parts had to be replicated for Picard based on the head and torso. They were custom made by Paul Elliot of Makeup Effects Lab, a company that has worked on the Star Trek franchise before.

==== Prosthetics ====
When approaching the design of the Romulans in the series, creature designer Neville Page of Alchemy Studios noted that the look of the species had evolved throughout the franchise, but had retained a basic design of specific ears, foreheads, and eyebrows. Page found that he had to be careful with the shape of the Romulans' foreheads in particular to prevent the characters from appearing like Elves. After Page completed his designs for the species, Vincent Van Dyke created variations on these for the individual prosthetics. The series includes two types of Romulans: those that required full silicon prosthetic foreheads, and those that appeared more human. For the latter, a "brow transfer" piece was used to cover the actors' eyebrows and allow their Romulan eyebrows to be placed over-top in a different direction. The eyebrows were created by hand stitching individual hairs into a piece of lace that was applied with the rest of the prosthetics. This was done for both the "hero" characters and background extras due to the requirements of high definition cameras, and the biggest challenge for the series' prosthetics team was having to create these complex prosthetics for up to 30 Romulan characters in some scenes.

At the start of the project, Page was most excited about getting to redesign the Borg, feeling that he had a clear vision for what the full head-to-toe character designs should be in a modern re-telling of that story. However, he soon realized that the Borg characters in the series are actually "XBs", former Borg drones that have had their implants mostly removed. How to approach this version of the characters was not obvious to Page, but he appreciated the challenge. Page's first instinct was to attempt to understand the reasoning behind the various Borg implants in previous Star Trek media, but he felt this was not the right approach due to the Borg assimilation being an alien process. He ended up trying to channel original designer Michael Westmore to attempt to make design decisions from the same place that the original prosthetics were designed from. For the remnants of implants that are seen on the XBs in the series, Page designed different variations which were then 3D-printed in plastic and glued onto silicone prosthetics by Van Dyke's team. Page noted that the XBs have an almost monstrous, Frankenstein-like appearance but tried to also create empathy for the characters. The prosthetics for the XBs were sent to set in modules with different facial prosthetics and small tech-based remnants that could be mixed-and-matched on set to create a unique selection of XBs based on which extras were there.

The gold make-up used for Data and the other synthetic beings in the series was compared to the paint on the original Nemesis B-4 head to ensure it was consistent with the films. Additionally, Page was able to design several new species for the series. This includes the Beta Annari character Mr. Vup, who appears in the fifth episode. His skin has a crocodile-like texture which was achieved through prosthetics for his face and hands, as well as layers of paint to help create the depth and texture. Page discussed his designs for the character with guest actor Dominic Burgess before sharing them with the production to ensure that the actor was comfortable with the prosthetics first. During the season, Page suggested to Kurtzman that they cast McKenzie Westmore, daughter of The Next Generation make-up designer Michael Westmore, for a background appearance wearing alien make-up that Page had designed for an older project. The character is named Rhomsew ("Wesmohr" backwards), and is an acknowledgement of Michael Westmore's work.

==== Sets and starships ====
Production designer Todd Cherniawsky found the experience of working on Picard to be quite different from Discovery, with the latter exploring a new era before the original Star Trek series that gave Cherniawsky freedom to develop new designs, while Picard follows on from the designs of The Next Generation which Cherniawsky wanted to honor. All of his designs for Picard began by studying the work of Herman F. Zimmerman on The Next Generation and many of the Star Trek films. He also worked closely with Beyer to take advantage of her knowledge of the franchise. Cherniawsky noted that a lot of the technology depicted in The Next Generation was based on what was deemed futuristic at the time, and so by creating technology for Picard that is deemed futuristic in modern times there was a natural evolution between the two series.

Cherniawsky stated that world building was difficult on a feature film let alone with a television schedule and budget, and the series' art department struggled to create unique new planet designs as they were required for Picard. This was an especial concern because the series is produced in California, which has been widely depicted on film and used for various fictional worlds before. Two of Cherniawsky's favorite scenes in the season were the bookending scenes between Picard and Data: the opening dream sequence, for which a portion of the Next Generation Ten Forward set was recreated; and the last scene between the characters in the digital "Dataverse". The latter was filmed on the set for Picard's study, which is used throughout the season as both a physical place at Chateau Picard and as a virtual location onboard La Sirena. For the Dataverse, the art department first considered painting the set all white before deciding to have the set reflect Data and his synthetic appearance, leading to a "gun-metal silver aluminized metallic" color.

John Eaves and Scott Schneider, designers of the starships for the Star Trek franchise, worked with Cherniawsky. This included designing the Borg Cube, which was updated from previous "futurized steampunk look" designs to be "completely made out of smart material, the purest of pure Borg components". La Sirena was designed to reflect Rios and his backstory. Cherniawsky described the character as a "warehouse of memories [with] an extensive collection of skeletons in his closet", and so the ship was designed as a "warehouse in space" that was very different from previous Star Trek starships. The Nostromo from the film Alien (1979) was an influence on the design.

=== Filming ===
In December 2018, the series was granted $15.6 million in tax credits by the California Film Commission for the production to take place in California rather than in Toronto, Canada, where Discovery is filmed. Before this grant, the intention had been for the series to be made in Toronto as well to take advantage of the existing Discovery crew. Ahead of the beginning of filming, director and guest star Jonathan Frakes said the season was being split into five "blocks" for production. Doug Aarniokoski served as producing director for the season, and worked with all the individual episodic directors to ensure a consistency in visuals and tone.

Philip Lanyon and Darran Tiernan served as cinematographers for the season, alternating episodes which allowed each of them time to prepare an episode while another was being filmed. Lanyon had filmed an episode of the second season of Star Trek: Discovery that was directed by Aarniokoski, and was subsequently asked to be the main cinematographer for Picard. Discovery used Anamorphic/i SF lenses made by Cooke Optics for its second season and Lanyon "fell in love" with them while working on the episode. He tested several different lenses for use on Picard, but ultimately returned to the same ones used on Discovery. It was important to Lanyon to honor the established visual tone of the "contemporary" Star Trek franchise, which he attributed to the J. J. Abrams-directed Star Trek films as well as Discovery, and this meant including lens flares in the visual language of the series. The SF ("Special Flair") lenses gave Lanyon greater control over when flares and other aberrations appeared on the images, and he felt the lenses provided a "warmth" to the series that worked well with Stewart's performance. The production had two complete sets of the lenses, covering several different focal lengths, and used them in conjunction with three Arri Alexa Mini cameras. The sets for the season were specifically designed to suit the wide 2.39:1 anamorphic aspect ratio of the lenses. Lanyon focused on practical lighting by taking advantage of the natural light of the vineyard in early episodes, and then tried not to use off-camera lighting on the series' sets.

==== Block one ====
Production began on April 22, 2019, at Santa Clarita Studios, California, under the working title Drawing Room. The first block of two episodes was set to be directed by Hanelle Culpepper, who previously directed for Discovery and is the first woman to direct the initial episode of a Star Trek series. Culpepper wanted to differentiate the style of the series from her work on Discovery, and felt there was some natural differences that arose from Picard being filmed on more locations than Discovery. Culpepper's general style involved more handheld cameras but less movement than Discovery, though she differentiated the scenes set in space from those on Earth by using more steady cam for the former to give it a "floaty" feeling. Culpepper first pitched her take to the producers in terms of colors, noting that the palette of Discovery features a lot of cool colors such as blues and purples and wanting Picard to be a warmer series with red, green, and orange. Culpepper was inspired to use these colors by the first episode's vineyard setting, and felt they reflected Picard's emotions in the series.

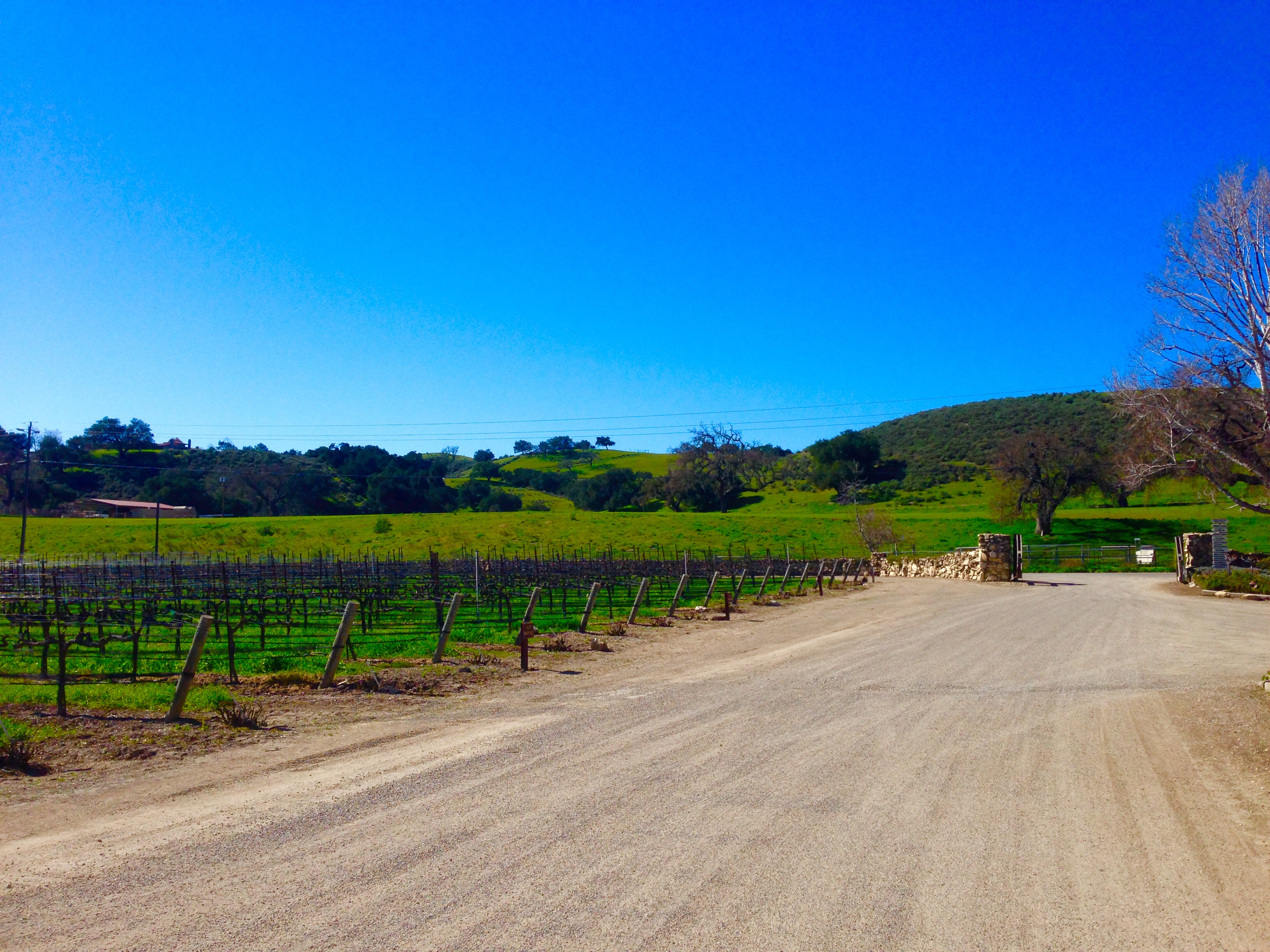
Filming took place at Sunstone Winery in Santa Ynez Valley, California to depict Chateau Picard

For the scenes set in Chateau Picard, Culpepper filmed several shots looking at Picard through objects such as wine bottles and glasses to give the impression that the character is trapped by his life at the vineyard. Chateau Picard is in France in the Star Trek universe, but the series could not logistically film on location in the country. When looking for a location to portray the vineyard and chateau in the United States, Culpepper wanted somewhere that felt more like an actual chateau than was depicted in The Next Generation. The final location was Sunstone Winery in Santa Ynez Valley, California, which features a villa constructed from reclaimed French materials. Filming took place there for a week in April 2019.

A scene from the first episode that Stewart fought for but was ultimately cut during editing featured Picard berating workers at his vineyard for their racist taunts of the Romulans on Picard's staff. The scene would have furthered the discussion of the treatment of Romulans by the Federation in the franchise, and also helped introduce the audience to the older and angrier version of Picard in the series, but ultimately the producers felt that it made him too angry at the start of the episode and undermined the impact of the television interview several scenes later. Stewart agreed to remove the scene after watching a cut of it with Kurtzman. Filming for the first episodes also took place on location at Vasquez Rocks in the Sierra Pelona Mountains in Los Angeles County, California, where Raffi's home is located in the series; the location has been frequently used as a stand-in for various planets on previous Star Trek series.

While Culpepper was editing the first two episodes, the writers came to feel that there was too much exposition required during later episodes that would be better served earlier in the season. After watching an almost completed version of Culpepper's episodes, the writers decided there were natural breaks where the two episodes could be split into three, which would allow new scenes to be added that could improve the overall storytelling. For instance, the writers realized that without showing the synth attack on Mars earlier in the season, the audience would not understand the horror of the moment and would be biased against the Federation's decisions. Subsequently, a flashback sequence depicting this event was added as the start of the new second episode. Culpepper said the new scenes make up most of the second episode and some of the first, with the completed third episode being predominantly footage from the original second episode. The flashback that opens the third episode and depicts the aftermath of Picard resigning from Starfleet was cut from the original second episode during writing, and was filmed after the episodes were split so it could be added to the third. Goldsman described the first three episodes as the season's first act, comparing them to the pilot episode of a traditional television series since they all introduce the main cast. The production referred to the episodes as 101, 102A, and 102B for logistical reasons.

==== Block two ====
Frakes directed the second block of two episodes. Kurtzman felt confident that Frakes could tell a Star Trek story while pushing the boundaries due to his long history of acting in and directing Star Trek series and films. He also felt it was appropriate for Frakes to direct the fourth episode, which features a father-son story between Picard and Elnor, due to the similar father-son dynamic between Stewart and Frakes in real life. Goldsman said that Frakes brought a lighter energy to the set and Stewart became more comfortable and humorous with the crew beginning with these episodes. Discussing filming two episodes back-to-back, Frakes stated that this is usually done to take advantage of the two episodes sharing sets, tones, and characters, but in this case the two episodes were quite different: in his words, the fourth episode has a western tone, while the fifth episode is like a futuristic nightclub. Goldsman explained that these two episodes are the most standalone of the season, which allowed for the writers to experiment more with tones, and this was done due to their focus on the hunt for Bruce Maddox which resembles a mission from a more serialized Star Trek series such as The Next Generation.

Contrasting his work on Picard with his previous work on Discovery, Frakes explained that the filming style of Discovery was more influenced by that of the J. J. Abrams-directed Star Trek films, while many of those elements such as unmotivated camera moves did not fit within the style of Picard. Despite this, he said the series still needed to look "cool" and not follow the "closeup, two shot, closeup" style of The Next Generation because of the way television has advanced since that series was made. The fifth episode was originally titled "Freecloud", but this was later changed to "Stardust City Rag" partly as a reference to David Bowie who is alluded to in several different ways throughout the episode. Another element changed for the episode was the villain Bjayzl, who was originally written to be a catlike Caitian (as previously seen in Star Trek: The Animated Series) who lives in an aviary and eats birds. This would have been realized through motion capture technology and CGI which ultimately proved to be beyond the limits of the series' budget. Frakes felt grateful that he was able to re-introduce the character Seven of Nine with his two episodes, and was particularly proud of the fifth episode scene in which Seven of Nine and Picard discuss the lingering effects of their past assimilation by the Borg, a topic that Frakes had previously explored with the character of Picard when directing the film Star Trek: First Contact. Frakes described the scene between the two characters in Picard as one of his favorites ever, noting that the self-doubt and emotional catharsis of the scene were less common on The Next Generation due to Star Trek creator Gene Roddenberry's rule that there be no conflict between the main characters of that series.

==== Blocks three and four ====
Maja Vrvilo directed the sixth and eighth episodes of the season. Describing the atmosphere on set when Vrvilo was directing, Chabon said that it was very different from Frakes' episodes with a more "focused energy" because of her directing style which was "very methodical, focused, prepared ... she has an energy of her own". The purpose of the eighth episode for Chabon was to explain the mysteries of the season's plot and tie the ongoing development of the supporting characters into that mystery to allow the two-part season finale to focus on the effects that the mysteries have on the characters rather than have to be the explanation themselves. Vrvilo worked closely with visual effects supervisor Jason Zimmerman for the scene where the various holograms of Rios onboard La Sirena come together. The scene made use of a motion control camera system to film multiple takes of the scene with Cabrera as the different holograms, which were later combined into single shots. Choreography between the different characters was required to control whenever the different holograms interacted with each other. Zimmerman noted that motion control shots take a long time film, but it was worth it for the result.

Producing director Doug Aarniokoski directed the seventh episode. Chabon saw the seventh episode as a pause or respite for the characters since all the seasons elements were well set by that point, and Picard had finally crossed paths with Soji. This led to the introduction of Riker and Troi, with their backstory tied into the idea that they brought their family to the planet for their son's attempted recovery. The scenes at Riker and Troi's cabin were filmed at the Universal backlot in a cabin first used by The Great Outdoors (1988). Sirtis was only available for filming for four days due to commitments to another show that she was making in London, which necessitated changing which production block her scenes were filmed in. While filming these scenes, The Next Generation cast members Michael Dorn and LeVar Burton visited the set for a reunion with Stewart, Frakes, and Sirtis. The seventh episode also includes Del Arco's final scenes as Hugh in which he watches fellow former-Borg drones being executed before dying himself. Del Arco was acting half-blind due to having a scratched cornea from one of his contact lenses, and found the scenes emotionally taxing to film, but was grateful that he was able to film them in order so his death scene was his final for the series.

==== Block five ====
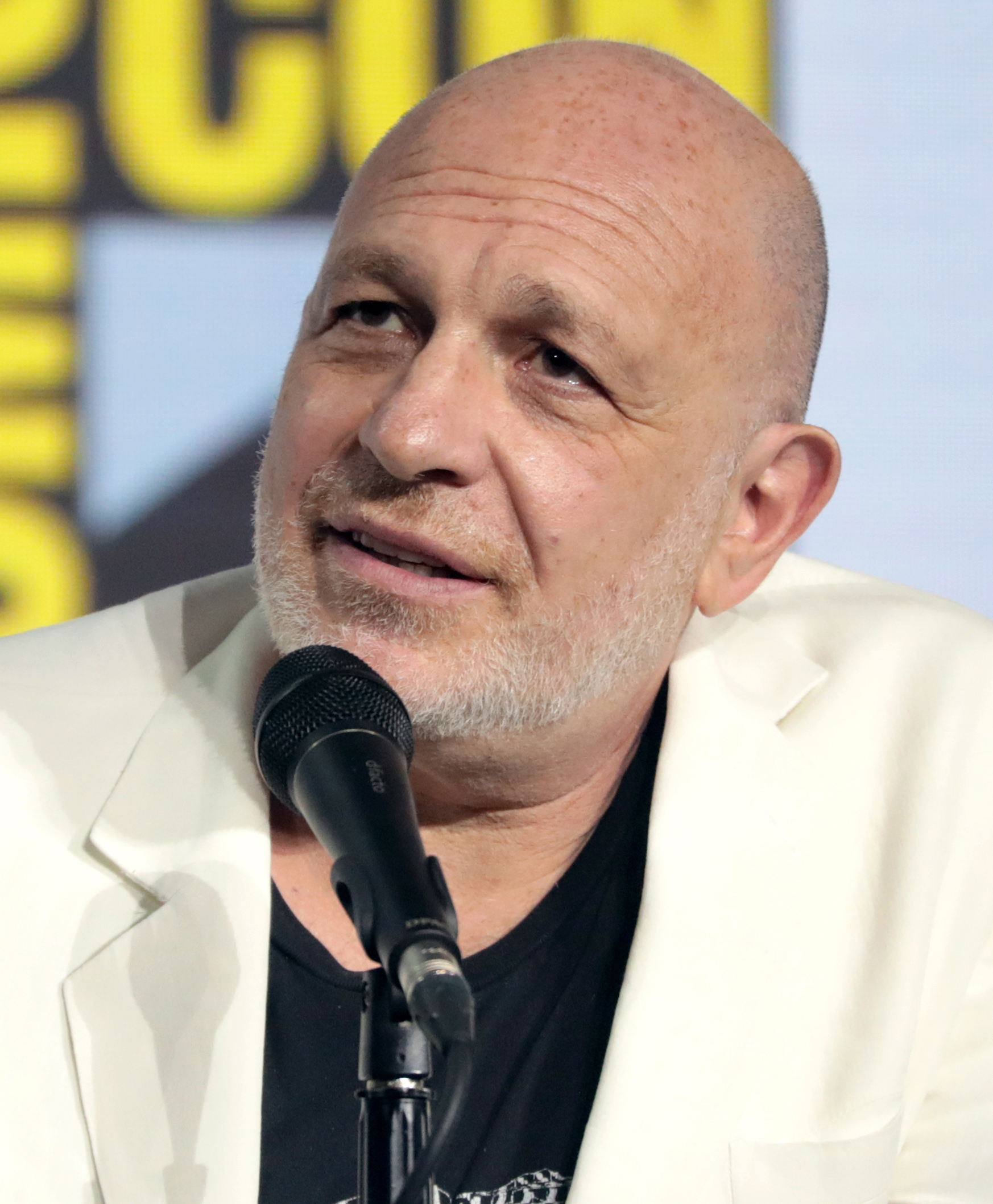
Co-creator Akiva Goldsman directed the last two episodes of the season

Executive producer Akiva Goldsman directed the last block comprising episodes nine and ten, which Chabon considered to be a two-part season finale. Goldsman filmed the two episodes as one and considered them to be almost arbitrarily split into two parts, feeling that this was mainly done to have a ten-episode season rather than for any story-based reasons. The production rented a parking lot on which a set for the androids' settlement was built. They ultimately had to work around the set due to a heat wave, with location shooting in Malibu also used for the planet. A moment where Raffi and Seven touch hands, implying a romantic connection, was ad-libbed by Hurd and Ryan on set.

The final scene between Picard and Data was filmed on the "Dataverse" version of the Chateau Picard study set. A full day was spent filming the scene, with Goldsman choosing to allow Stewart and Spiner to perform the full scene in long takes. He felt that they "know each other and these characters very well, and they don't need a lot of help". He would discuss ideas for each take at the start with them before letting them play out the scene. It was important to Goldsman that the scene make it clear that Picard had died for real as that was an important emotional element of the scene, even though the character was going to be resurrected soon after. Filming this scene was the highlight of the season for Stewart, calling it an "intense experience" due to the seriousness of the subject and the fact that it was the last time Picard and Data would be together. The following day, when the set was being dismantled, Stewart bought the chair he was sitting in for the scene from the production and took it back to his home in England; it is one of the few mementos that Stewart kept from his work on Star Trek, which he attributed to the emotion of the scene as well as the fact that it was "an incredibly comfortable chair". Stewart promised the production that he would bring the chair back to set if it was ever required again.

Frakes's appearance in the final episode aboard the USS Zheng He, named for the Chinese explorer of the same name, was filmed on the set of Star Trek: Discovery. The set was redressed for this, with the Discovery's captain's chair changed and the distinctive glass panels removed from the rest of the set. Frakes directed himself for this footage while he was directing an episode of the third season of Discovery. Chabon announced that filming for the season had concluded on September 1, 2019.

=== Visual effects ===
The series' visual effects were provided by Pixomondo, DNEG, Crafty Apes, Ghost VFX, Gentle Giant Studios, Technicolor VFX, and Filmworks/FX. Visual effects supervisor Jason Zimmerman explained that all design work for the visual effects began with the designs from The Next Generation. These were then updated to match the in-universe time difference as well as to take advantage of the advancements in visual effects since that series was produced. He noted that production designer Todd Cherniawsky is experienced with visual effects-heavy series and always designed for Picard with the visual effects team in mind. Pixomondo began work on the series before filming began, working alongside the production design department to help flesh out their designs into 3D assets that the vendors could use. These computer generated models included the Borg Cube, La Sirena, and the Romulan ships. The visual effects team also worked with the cinematography department to replicate the series' lenses and lighting correctly.

A lot of the effects work on the series consisted of digital set extensions and world building, something that differentiated the series from Discovery for Zimmerman. For establishing shots, fictional elements such as buildings and starships were added to exterior shots which also sometimes required modern-day elements like cars to be removed or hidden. Scenes set on Mars were based on reference images taken by Mars rovers, with Zimmerman noting that Star Trek fans expect the series to be "rooted in science" like that. The new planet Freecloud, and the holographic advertisements that appear when the characters approach the planet, were inspired by Las Vegas, which Zimmerman acknowledged was a departure from previous Star Trek planet designs. The visual effects team used digital doubles to help populate crowd scenes on different planets, as well as the interiors of the Borg Cube. For scenes in space, the visual effects team used reference imagery from throughout the Star Trek franchise as well as new footage from NASA, and worked to find logical ways to light starships in space such as having the light come from nearby planets or stars. Another difficult effect that Zimmerman highlighted was the outdoor transporter booths seen on Earth in the series, which use the bright flashes seen in previous Star Trek series but in broad daylight, something that required "a lot of finessing to get a good blend". The visual effects team also digitally de-aged Brent Spiner for his appearances as Data in the series, to make him appear as he did in Nemesis.

The Borg Cube is 4.7 kilometres (2.9 mi) across, and conveying that scale was difficult for the visual effects team since it is floating in space with no size reference. Pixomondo's model was created with 23 different pieces that the modelling team repeated over 9 million times across the surface of the cube. It also includes a Romulan hangar that is differentiated in terms of design from the rest of the cube. The final Borg Cube model consisted of 82.7 billion polygons, which Pixomondo was only able to render due to using the Arnold rendering software and its ability to create "stand-ins" to simplify elements of the render. Pixomondo then needed to share the model with DNEG and Ghost VFX who were using different rendering software; Pixomondo worked with the other companies to simplify the model down to a base language that they could use to get similar results with their own software. The interiors of the Borg Cube were built as sets, but were digitally extended; Zimmerman gave this as an example of the more "subtle" visual effects created for the series. The Borg Cube is revealed in the first episode with an "ambitious pullback reveal" inspired by a similar shot from the film Star Trek: First Contact, showing the advancements in visual effects since that film was made. The shot included almost every asset that Pixomondo created for the series, including the Borg Cube, Romulan hangar, and Romulan ships. Pixomondo CG supervisor Dan Smiczek said the vendor was "really proud" of the shot, with almost all of their Picard team having worked on it.

The season finale was the largest episode for visual effects that Zimmerman had worked on across both Picard and Discovery, requiring 60 to 70 visual effects shots. The visual effects team had eight to ten weeks to complete the episode. They began by mapping out the battle between the Romulan fleet, the giant space orchids used by the synthetics, and the Federation fleet, figuring out where the factions would be in relation to the planet Coppelius. Once Goldsman approved the plan, a previsualization of the sequence was created and then the animation was refined from there. For the orchids, Chabon was loosely inspired by the works of Jean Giraud, and mentioned orchids throughout the season as part of Soji's backstory to set-up their later appearance. The final orchid models were scaled down from the original designs, and their colors were adjusted to be photo-real and to better contrast with the Borg Cube since they appear onscreen together. The bridges of the Federation and Romulan ships in the finale were also created digitally.

=== Music ===
Composer Jeff Russo had several ideas when he began work on the main title for Picard, but the first melody that he played became the idea that he associated with Picard and the series. He then had to fashion this into a theme that matched the tone of the show, and went through several different iterations: a "swashbuckling" version, a "'space' show" version, a darker and more contemplative version, and finally a more emotional and stirring version which became the actual theme. It is bookended with a piccolo, which Russo felt sounded similar to the fictional Ressikan flute that Picard played in the Next Generation episode "The Inner Light", while the main melody is played on a cello which Russo often uses since it "fills that same harmonic space as the human voice". In addition to his original ideas, Russo chose to use Fred Steiner's Romulan theme from the Star Trek: The Original Series episode "Balance of Terror" (1966) to represent the Romulan characters in the season. He also referenced the main theme from Star Trek: Voyager for Seven of Nine's appearances. Russo had more opportunities to help tell the story in the season than his work on Discovery, with more scenes in Picard featuring the music and little dialogue such as Soji and Narek's waltz in "Absolute Candor" and Picard's death in the finale.

The season is bookended with the song "Blue Skies" by Irving Berlin, which is heard during Picard's dream of Data in the premiere and then again during Data's death in the finale. This is a reference to Nemesis, in which Data sung "Blue Skies". For Picard, Russo arranged a new version of the song with similar orchestration to the series' score. Kurtzman suggested that Briones sing the lyrics after performing in the touring production of Hamilton; Briones felt this was appropriate since she portrays Data's daughters in the series. Russo described the end of the finale, including "Blue Skies", as a "complicated puzzle". The episode ends with a swashbuckling-themed end credits cue because Russo wanted to end the season with a "rousing feeling". He began recording his score for the series in November 2019, at the Eastwood Scoring Stage at Warner Bros. Studios in California.

A soundtrack album featuring selections from Russo's score for the first half of the season was released digitally by Lakeshore Records on February 2, 2020. It also includes two cues from Russo's Short Treks score. The new version of "Blue Skies" was released digitally as a single on March 26, followed by a second soundtrack album on April 3. The latter is a complete album comprising all tracks from the first album, selections from the second half of the season, and "Blue Skies". A special edition vinyl release featuring selections from the first season album and pressed on "Borg-errific green vinyl" was released on October 9. All music by Jeff Russo:

Original Series Soundtrack: Season 1
No.	Title	Length
1.	"Star Trek: Picard Main Title"	1:43
2.	"Star Trek: Picard End Title"	1:44
3.	"Walking with Number One"	1:16
4.	"Dahj Activates"	1:10
5.	"Dahj and Picard Speak"	3:54
6.	"Dahj's Last Fight"	1:51
7.	"Picard Decides"	1:46
8.	"The Painting"	2:58
9.	"Twins"	4:15
10.	"Picard Requests Help"	2:15
11.	"Romulan Collusion"	2:21
12.	"Trouble for Picard"	1:18
13.	"Rafi Decides to Join"	1:51
14.	"Rafi Turns Down Picard"	2:06
15.	"Sizing Up Rios"	4:15
16.	"Happier Times"	3:25
17.	"Leaving with Elnor"	1:52
18.	"Mystery Ship"	3:10
19.	"Picard Goes Back"	2:08
20.	"Picard Leaves Elnor"	1:41
21.	"Soji and Narek Waltz"	4:42
22.	"Home Movies"	1:52
23.	"Jurati and Maddox"	1:55
24.	"Leaving with Maddox"	3:47
25.	"Seven Needs Revenge"	3:02
26.	"What's Your Emergency"	1:25
27.	"Page" (From Short Treks: "Children of Mars")	1:58
28.	""Children of Mars" End Credits" (From Short Treks: "Children of Mars")	1:43
29.	"Jurati and Rios Get Close"	2:37
30.	"Raffi Calls Bosch"	3:26
31.	"Raffi Opens Up"	1:34
32.	"Borg Cube"	4:28
33.	"Looking for Picard"	5:10
34.	"Walking Around Nepenthe"	2:25
35.	"Picard and Riker Reunite"	2:34
36.	"I Was Human"	3:04
37.	"Elnor Fights Narissa"	2:47
38.	"Picard Bids Farewell"	5:01
39.	"Tal Shiar Admonisher"	2:46
40.	"Staying Close"	2:59
41.	"Rios Feels Lost"	2:06
42.	"Hologram Meeting"	1:06
43.	"Raffi and Rios Talk"	4:40
44.	"Rios and Picard"	3:13
45.	"Unexpected Visitor"	2:32
46.	"Leaving the La Sirena"	2:51
47.	"Sutra Arrives"	4:23
48.	"Narek Escapes"	8:07
49.	"Butterfly"	1:41
50.	"Romulans Arrive Pt.1"	2:12
51.	"Romulans Arrive Pt.2"	4:35
52.	"Talking to Data"	6:32
53.	"The Crew Leaves As One"	1:24
54.	"Blue Skies" (Performed by Isa Briones)	2:46
55.	"Star Trek: Picard Episode 110 End Credits (Full Version)"	2:10
Total length:		1:35:39

== Marketing ==
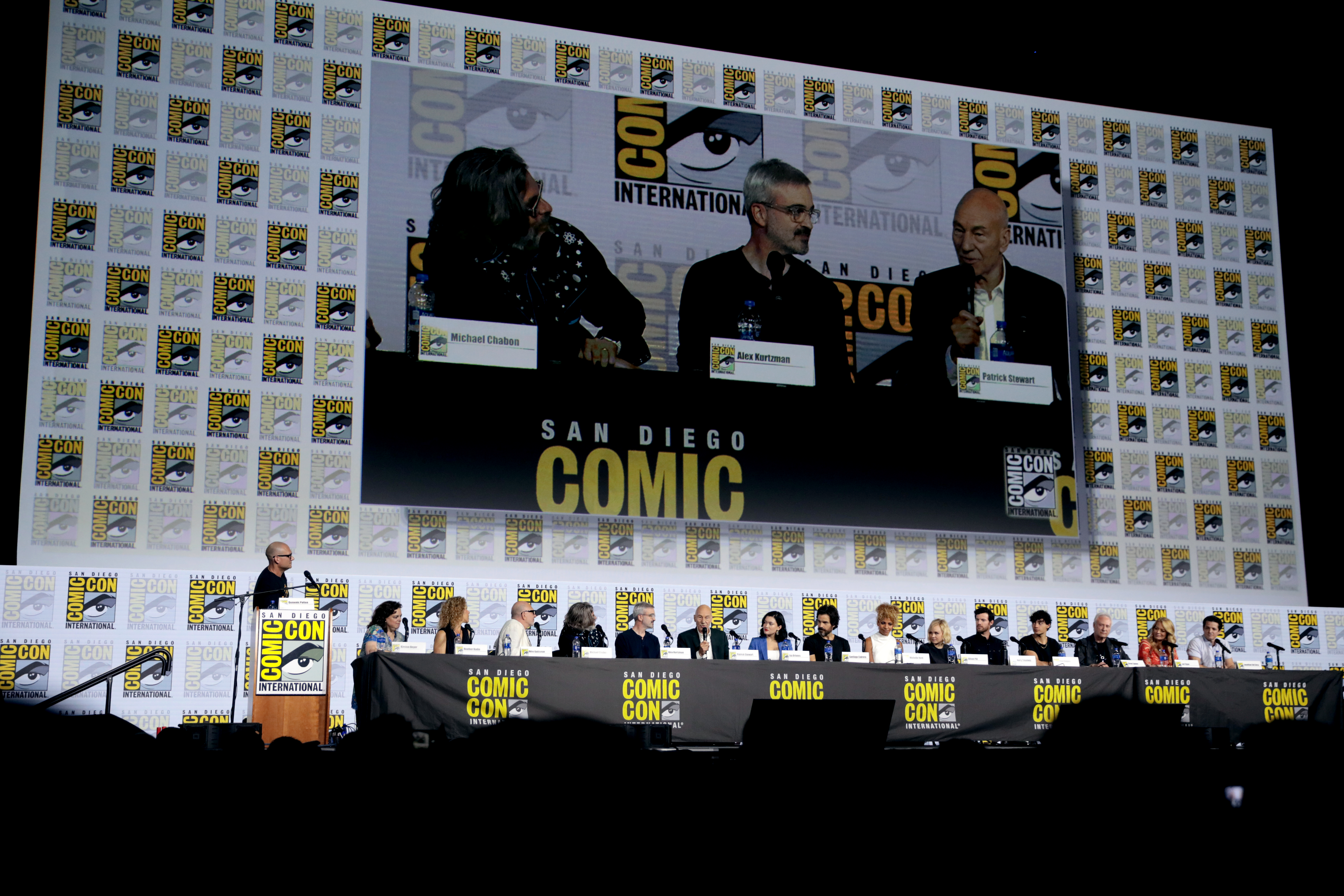
Cast and crew promoting the series at the 2019 San Diego Comic-Con

A teaser and first poster for the season were released in May 2019, on the 25th anniversary of the series finale of The Next Generation. Both the teaser and poster focused on the Picard vineyard and the season's new backstory. It was promoted in July at San Diego Comic-Con 2019, in a "Star Trek Universe" panel alongside other series from the franchise. The panel featured the main cast and executive producers, who introduced the first full trailer for the season. The trailer revealed that Spiner and Ryan would be guest starring in the season, and they joined the panel after the trailer was shown along with Del Arco. Also at San Diego, a special exhibition called "Jean-Luc Picard: The First Duty" was displayed at the Michael J Wolf Fine Arts art gallery, featuring props and costumes from throughout Stewart's Star Trek career along with first looks at props and costumes from Picard. A second trailer for the season debuted at the 2019 New York Comic Con in October, at a panel that also included Culpepper. The premiere date for the season was also revealed at the panel.

Also in October, CBS and Paramount released a Blu-ray collection titled Star Trek – Picard Movie and TV Collection, including two two-part episodes of Star Trek: The Next Generation—"The Best of Both Worlds" and "Chain of Command"—as well as the four Star Trek films starring the cast of Next Generation: Star Trek Generations (1994), Star Trek: First Contact, Star Trek: Insurrection (1998), and Star Trek: Nemesis. The collection also includes ten hours of previously released special features as well as an exclusive, original comic book titled Star Trek: Sky's The Limit from IDW Publishing. The comic book was written by Thomas F. Zahler with art by Carlos Nieto and coloring by Charlie Kirchoff. Additionally, CBS worked with Wines That Rock and the actual Château Picard in Bordeaux, France (which is not related to the fictional Star Trek Château Picard) to release a limited edition wine, the 2016 Château Picard Bordeaux, as marketing for the series. Wines That Rock also released a limited edition 2017 Old Vine Zinfandel wine labelled as a "United Federation of Planets wine" from California winery Dry Creek & Russian River Valleys.

In January 2020, RockLove Jewelry released a new line of Picard-inspired jewelry, including a necklace worn by Dahj and Soji that was designed with prop master Jeff Lombardi. Chabon wanted to be involved in all aspects of the series, including interacting with the fans as the season was released. He spent a lot of time looking at messages on Twitter and Reddit, but was discouraged when he found Twitter to be "kind of a horrible place". His children introduced him to the ability to answer fan questions via a story on Instagram, and he found that to be a fun way to interact with fans and discuss the series, likening it to his time as a younger Star Trek fan on the internet.

== Release ==
=== Streaming and broadcast ===
The season premiered on January 23, 2020, on CBS All Access in the United States, and ran weekly for 10 episodes until March 26. Like Discovery before it, each episode of Picard was broadcast in Canada by Bell Media on the same day as the All Access release, on the specialty channels CTV Sci-Fi Channel (English) and Z (French) before streaming on Crave. Amazon Prime Video released each episode within 24 hours of its U.S. debut in over 200 other countries and territories around the world.

In the week after the season premiered, the first episode was released for free on YouTube in the U.S. for a limited time. On January 30, the ViacomCBS free streaming service PlutoTV aired a 24-hour marathon of the series' first episode, followed by repeat viewings each night through February 5 as the lead-off title for a programming block. Days before the release of the season finale on March 26, Stewart announced a free month of CBS All Access for viewers in the U.S., ending on April 23. This would allow non-subscribers to watch the entire season for free. The offer came while many in the U.S. were isolated at home due to the COVID-19 pandemic.

The first three episodes of the season were made available to stream for free on CBS.com, StarTrek.com, and PlutoTV for a week beginning June 17, 2020, as part of a CBS All Access event titled #StarTrekUnited. The episodes were among 15 of the "most culturally relevant" Star Trek episodes that were chosen to be included as part of the event, which served as a fundraiser for several organisations including Black Strategy Fund, Movement for Black Lives, and Black Lives Matter. For the fundraiser, $1 was donated to one of those organizations by CBS All Access for every fan that tweeted using the hashtag #StarTrekUnitedGives on the day of June 17.

In September 2020, ViacomCBS announced that CBS All Access would be expanded and rebranded as Paramount+ in March 2021. The season remained on Paramount+ along with future seasons. In February 2023, Paramount made a new deal with Prime Video for the series' international streaming rights. This allowed the season to be added to Paramount+ in some other countries in addition to remaining on Prime Video. In August 2023, Star Trek content was removed from Crave and the season began streaming in Canada on Paramount+ instead. The series would continue to be broadcast on CTV Sci-Fi and be available on CTV.ca and the CTV app.

=== Home media ===
The season was released on DVD, Blu-Ray, and Limited Edition Steelbook formats in the U.S. on October 6, 2020. The release includes all 10 episodes, as well as behind-the-scenes featurettes, deleted scenes, a gag reel, and a commentary for the first episode by Kurtzman, Goldsman, Chabon, Beyer, and Culpepper. Also included in the release is "Children of Mars", a short film from the Star Trek: Short Treks companion series. On September 5, 2023, a box set featuring the complete series and over seven hours of special features was released, while a 54-disc Blu-ray "Picard Legacy Collection" that includes this series was released on November 7.

== Reception ==
=== Viewership ===
A week after the season premiere, CBS said that Picard had set a new record for the total streams of a CBS All Access original series with 115 percent more total streams than the previous record set by Star Trek: Discovery. CBS also attributed the premiere, alongside the 62nd Annual Grammy Awards and a busy month of football games, for the month of January 2020 breaking the service's record for the most new subscribers in a month. Previously held by February 2019, the new January 2020 record includes the second-most new subscribers in a single week for the service during the week of Picard's premiere. In Canada, 1.1 million viewers watched the series' premiere live or on the same day as its debut, the largest ever audience for an episode on the CTV Sci-Fi Channel. A week later, the first episode's confirmed audience had grown to 1.85 million viewers, with 3 million having watched at least part of the episode, making it the most-watched entertainment specialty broadcast ever in Canada. The episode also received the most first week viewership for any series premiere on Crave.

=== Critical response ===
Star Trek: Picard season 1: Critical reception by episode
Percentage of positive critics' reviews tracked by the website Rotten Tomatoes

The review aggregator website Rotten Tomatoes reported an 86% approval rating with an average rating of 7.55/10 based on 252 reviews. The website's critical consensus reads, "Anchored by the incomparable Patrick Stewart, Picard departs from standard Starfleet protocol with a slower, serialized story, but like all great Star Trek it tackles timely themes with grace and makes for an exciting push further into the final frontier." Metacritic, which uses a weighted average, assigned a score of 76 out of 100 based on reviews from 27 critics, indicating "generally favorable" reviews.

Reviewing the first three episodes, Liz Shannon Miller of Paste was happy that the series was not a prequel and instead expanded the franchise. She praised the cast, especially Stewart, but felt some of the big twists would not work as well for new viewers as they did for existing Star Trek fans. Writing for Forbes, Merrill Barr agreed that the series was more accessible to existing fans but felt it was less inaccessible to new fans than Discovery. He said there were elements of the opening episodes that could have been faster, but was optimistic about the rest of the season. Daniel D'Addario of Variety said Stewart was the series' greatest asset, praising his performance while also criticizing the slow pace. Joshua Rivera at The Verge felt the first three episodes worked well for both new viewers and old Star Trek fans, but criticized the amount of explanation in the episodes which he felt made them meander. He was also concerned that the series was providing too-easy answers to its philosophical questions, but hoped that this could be fixed in later episodes. Ben Travers at IndieWire gave a "B" grade to the first three episodes, praising Stewart but expressing concern at the series' reliance on nostalgia for previous Star Trek stories. He compared the series to the Star Wars sequel trilogy, feeling that seeing Luke Skywalker again was nostalgic, but deconstructing him in Star Wars: The Last Jedi (2017) was more satisfying. Travers said Picard could do the same thing as long as it moved away from its more nostalgic depiction of the character. Brian Lowry gave a negative review of the episodes for CNN, focusing on the nostalgic elements and slow pace.

Jennifer Ouellette reviewed the season for Ars Technica after its finale and noted that the slow pace of the opening episodes continued for the rest of the season and may have stemmed from Chabon's background writing novels. She acknowledged that this was one of several fan concerns with the season, which also included the series' darker tone and perceived similarities between its story and designs and those of the video game Mass Effect 2 (2010). Ouellette personally appreciated the season's focus on characters, and was especially positive about the inclusion of Seven of Nine and her interactions with Raffi. She felt the season would have been stronger if it was a miniseries, believing that Picard's death at the end of the season was undermined by the need to have him return for a second season. She also felt that the evolution of his mission from saving Soji to saving an entire race of synthetic beings elevated the stakes of the series beyond its exploration of characters and themes. Writing about the season for Rolling Stone, Alan Sepinwall praised Stewart and said he elevated the series which was otherwise "overstuffed" with a story that was too complex for its 10 episodes. Sepinwall specifically noted that the more episodic stories, such as "Stardust City Rag", were appreciated but meant that the overall storyline was not given the time it needed to be explored. He appreciated that the season gave a better ending to Data's story than Nemesis, and felt the overall season was a good start to the series, but hoped that the second season would have a clearer storyline. Stephen Kelly for The Guardian criticized the series' dark tone, violence, and profanity, stating that optimism for the future was more important than Chabon and Kurtzman seemed to believe. He contrasted the series to Star Trek: Deep Space Nine, which was able to tell a similarly dark story without losing the hopefulness of the rest of the franchise. In May 2020, Ruth Terry wrote an article for StarTrek.com with commentary by communications professor and author Dr. Thomas Parham III, in which they praised the season for acknowledging Picard's role as an ally to marginalized groups while forcing him to face his own privilege. Terry wrote that representation and inclusion were considered more important in 2020 than when the previous Star Trek series were made, and Picard was able to reflect that by showing the title character lose his able-bodiedness, his relevancy at Starfleet, and some of his relationships, while learning to show more empathy. She felt that reflecting the current time in this way was something that Star Trek had always done well and Picard continued that.

Discussing responses to the season, Chabon felt there were some vocal fan criticisms because it did not meet their expectations of Picard and his world. Chabon said he had felt the same after growing up watching the original Star Trek series and then experiencing the changes made to the franchise for The Next Generation, and he felt fans would come to appreciate Picard over time as he did with The Next Generation. Chabon also said there was a section of the series' audience that he called the "toxic fandom, the anti-SJW" group, and he chose to ignore them. On the killing of legacy Star Trek characters Icheb and Hugh, Chabon felt the way they died justified the acts: Icheb's death was an important part of Seven of Nine's character arc, and Hugh's death was a meaningful conclusion to his own character arc. Chabon was surprised that some audience members were "upset about a character's death regardless of how that character died ... I just don't understand television in that way." On the series' approach to LGBTQ characters, Chabon acknowledged that some fans were disappointed that the series did not explicitly explore such characters like Star Trek: Discovery does, but he intentionally wanted to reveal personal details about the cast in a more naturalistic way. This is why the only time sexuality is addressed explicitly in the season is when it reveals Jurati's state of mind after she kills Maddox. Chabon did feel that the season had, in its more subtle way, shown both Seven of Nine and Raffi to have previously been in same-sex relationships.

=== Accolades ===
The season is one of 33 television series that received the ReFrame Stamp for the 2019 to 2020 season. The stamp is awarded by the gender equity coalition ReFrame as a "mark of distinction for film and TV projects that ... hire female-identifying people in four out of eight areas of production" to show progress in gender-balanced hiring. In a general statement, ReFrame highlighted Culpepper as the first woman to direct a Star Trek premiere.

Year	Award	Category	Nominee(s)	Result	Ref.
2020	Dragon Awards	Best Science Fiction or Fantasy TV Series	Star Trek: Picard	Nominated	
2020	Primetime Creative Arts Emmy Awards	Outstanding Period and/or Character Hairstyling	Maxine Morris, Maria Sandoval, Wendy Southard, Sallie Nicole Ciganovich, Ashleigh Childers, and Yesim Osman (for "Stardust City Rag")	Nominated	
2020	Primetime Creative Arts Emmy Awards	Outstanding Period and/or Character Makeup (Non-Prosthetic)	Silvina Knight, Robin Beauchesne, David Williams, Peter De Oliveira, and Natalie Thimm (for "Stardust City Rag")	Nominated	
2020	Primetime Creative Arts Emmy Awards	Outstanding Prosthetic Makeup for a Series, Limited Series, Movie or Special	James Robert Mackinnon, Vincent Van Dyke, Richard Redlefsen, Alexei Dmit Riew, Neville Page, and Michael Ornelaz (for "Absolute Candor")	Won	
2020	Primetime Creative Arts Emmy Awards	Outstanding Sound Editing for a Comedy or Drama Series (One Hour)	Matthew E. Taylor, Tim Farrell, Henry Cohen, Michael Schapiro, Sean Heissinger, Clay Weber, Moira Marquis, Stan Jones, Alyson Dee Moore, and Chris Moriana (for "Et in Arcadia Ego, Part 2")	Nominated	
2020	Primetime Creative Arts Emmy Awards	Outstanding Sound Mixing for a Comedy or Drama Series (One Hour)	Peter J. Devlin, Todd M. Grace, Edward C. Carr III, and Michael Perfitt (for "Et in Arcadia Ego, Part 2")	Nominated	
2021	Costume Designers Guild Awards	Excellence in Sci-Fi/Fantasy Television	Christine Bieselin Clark (for "Absolute Candor")	Nominated	
2021	Critics' Choice Super Awards	Best Science Fiction/Fantasy Series	Star Trek: Picard	Nominated	
2021	Critics' Choice Super Awards	Best Actor in a Science Fiction/Fantasy Series	Patrick Stewart	Won	
2021	Make-Up Artists and Hair Stylists Guild Awards	Best Special Make-Up Effects in a Television Series, Limited or Miniseries or New Media Series	James MacKinnon, Richard Redlefsen, Alexei Dmitriew and Vincent Van Dyke	Nominated	
2021	Motion Picture Sound Editors Awards	Outstanding Achievement in Sound Editing – Dialogue and ADR for Episodic Long Form Broadcast Media	Matthew E. Taylor and Sean Heissinger (for "The Impossible Box")	Nominated	
2021	Motion Picture Sound Editors Awards	Outstanding Achievement in Sound Editing – Sound Effects and Foley for Episodic Long Form Broadcast Media	Matthew E. Taylor, Tim Farrell, Harry Cohen, Michael Schapiro, Clay Weber, Darrin Mann, Alyson Dee Moore and Chris Moriana (for "Et in Arcadia Ego, Part 2")	Won (Note: Tied with The Queen's Gambit.)	
2021	NAACP Image Awards	Outstanding Directing in a Drama Series	Hanelle Culpepper (for "Remembrance")	Won	
2021	Saturn Awards	Best Science Fiction Television Series	Star Trek: Picard	Nominated	
2021	Saturn Awards	Best Actor on Television	Patrick Stewart	Won	
2021	Saturn Awards	Best Performance by a Younger Actor in a Television Series	Isa Briones	Nominated	
2021	Saturn Awards	Best Guest Starring Role on Television	Jeri Ryan	Nominated	
