= Data (Star Trek) =

Fictional character in the fictional Star Trek universe

- Star Trek: The Next Generation character
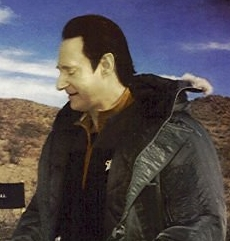
- Brent Spiner as Lieutenant Commander Data
- First appearance: "Encounter at Farpoint" (1987) (The Next Generation)
- Created by: Gene Roddenberry; D. C. Fontana
- Portrayed by: Brent Spiner

In-universe information
- Full name: Data Soong
- Species: Soong-Type Synthetic intelligence Android-lifeform
- Gender: None
- Title(s): Chief Operations Officer; Second Officer
- Affiliation: United Federation of Planets; Starfleet
- Family: Juliana Tainer ("mother"); Noonien Soong (creator/"father"); B-4 (older "brother"); Lore (older "brother"); Dr. Altan Inigo Soong ("brother")
- Children: Lal (creation/"daughter"); Dahj Asha (neural progeny/"daughter"); Soji Asha (neural progeny/"daughter"); Jana (neural progeny/"daughter"); Sutra (neural progeny/"daughter")
- Origin: Omicron Theta
- Rank: Lieutenant Commander
- Posting: USS Enterprise-E; (FCT, INS, NEM); USS Enterprise-D; (Seasons 1–7, GEN)
- Position: Chief Operations Officer (USS Enterprise-D, USS Enterprise-E); Second Officer (USS Enterprise-D, USS Enterprise-E)

Data is a fictional character in the Star Trek franchise. He appears in the television series Star Trek: The Next Generation (TNG), the first and third seasons of Star Trek: Picard, and the fifth season of Star Trek: Lower Decks, and the feature films Star Trek Generations (1994), First Contact (1996), Insurrection (1998), and Nemesis (2002). Data is portrayed by actor Brent Spiner.

Data is a self-aware, sapient, sentient and anatomically fully functional male android who serves as the second officer and chief operations officer aboard the Federation starship USS Enterprise-D and later the USS Enterprise-E.

Data is in many ways a successor to the original Star Trek's Spock, in that the character has superior mental skills and offers an "outsider's" perspective on humanity.

== Development ==
Gene Roddenberry told Brent Spiner that over the course of the series, Data was to become "more and more like a human until the end of the show, when he would be very close, but still not quite there. That was the idea and that's the way that the writers took it." Spiner felt that Data exhibited the Chaplinesque characteristics of a sad, tragic clown. To get into his role as Data, Spiner used the character of Robby the Robot from the film Forbidden Planet as a role model. Before Spiner was cast, Eric Menyuk, Mark Lindsay Chapman, Kevin Peter Hall, and Kelvin Han Yee were considered for the role.

Commenting on Data's perpetual albino-like appearance, he said: "I spent more hours of the day in make-up than out of make-up", so much so that he even called it a way of method acting. Spiner also portrayed Data's manipulative and malevolent brother Lore (a role he found much easier to play, because the character was "more like me"), and Data's creator, Dr. Noonien Soong. Additionally, he portrayed another Soong-type android, B-4, in the film Star Trek: Nemesis, and also Arik Soong, one of Soong's ancestors in three episodes of Star Trek: Enterprise. Spiner said his favorite Data scene takes place in "Descent", when Data plays poker on the holodeck with a re-creation of the famous physicist Stephen Hawking, played by Hawking himself.

Spiner reprised his role of Data in the Star Trek: Enterprise series finale "These Are the Voyages..." in an off-screen speaking part. Spiner felt that he had visibly aged out of the role and that Data was best presented as a youthful figure. Spiner returned to the role for 2020 Star Trek: Picard, having been convinced by the advent of digital de-aging tools. He also accepted because the negative fan reaction to the death of Data in Nemesis took him by surprise, and the scene in Picard gave a new opportunity for a proper sendoff to the character. Initially stating that the 2020 first season of Picard would be his final time playing Data, Spiner returned to the role for the series' 2023 third and final season, portraying an aged Data, Lore, and B-4.

== Depiction ==
=== Biography ===
Data was found by Starfleet in 2338. He was the sole survivor on Omicron Theta in the rubble of a colony left after an attack from the Crystalline Entity. He is a synthetic lifeform with artificial intelligence, designed and built by Doctor Noonien Soong in his own likeness (likewise portrayed by Spiner).

His positronic brain allows him impressive computational capabilities. He experienced ongoing difficulties during the early years of his life with understanding various aspects of human behavior and was unable to feel emotion or understand certain human idiosyncrasies, inspiring him to strive for his own humanity. This goal eventually led to the addition of an "emotion chip", created by Soong, to Data's positronic net. Although Data's endeavor to increase his humanity and desire for human emotional experience is a significant plot point (and source of humor) throughout the series, he consistently shows a nuanced sense of wisdom, sensitivity and curiosity, garnering respect from his peers and colleagues.

Dialog in "Datalore" establishes some of Data's backstory. It is stated that he was deactivated in 2336 on Omicron Theta before an attack by the Crystalline Entity, a spaceborne creature which converts life forms to energy for sustenance. He was found and reactivated by Starfleet personnel two years later. Data went to Starfleet Academy from 2341 to 2345 (he describes himself as "Class of '78" to Commander William Riker in the series premiere "Encounter at Farpoint"—with "honors in probability mechanics and exobiology", although canonically may only refer to the stardate) and then served in Starfleet aboard the USS Trieste. He was assigned to the Enterprise under Captain Jean-Luc Picard in 2364. In "Datalore", Data discovers his amoral brother, Lore, and learns that Dr. Noonien Soong created Data after Lore. Lore fails in an attempt to betray the Enterprise to the Crystalline Entity, and Wesley Crusher beams Data's brother into space at the episode's conclusion. Lore claimed that Data was "less-perfect", which was a lie, as Soong later confirmed to Data in "Brothers"; the only real difference between the two of them "was some programming" (Lore's positronic net differed from Data's: it had a Type-"L" phase discriminator compared to Data's Type-"R"; see episode "Time's Arrow").

=== Television series and films ===
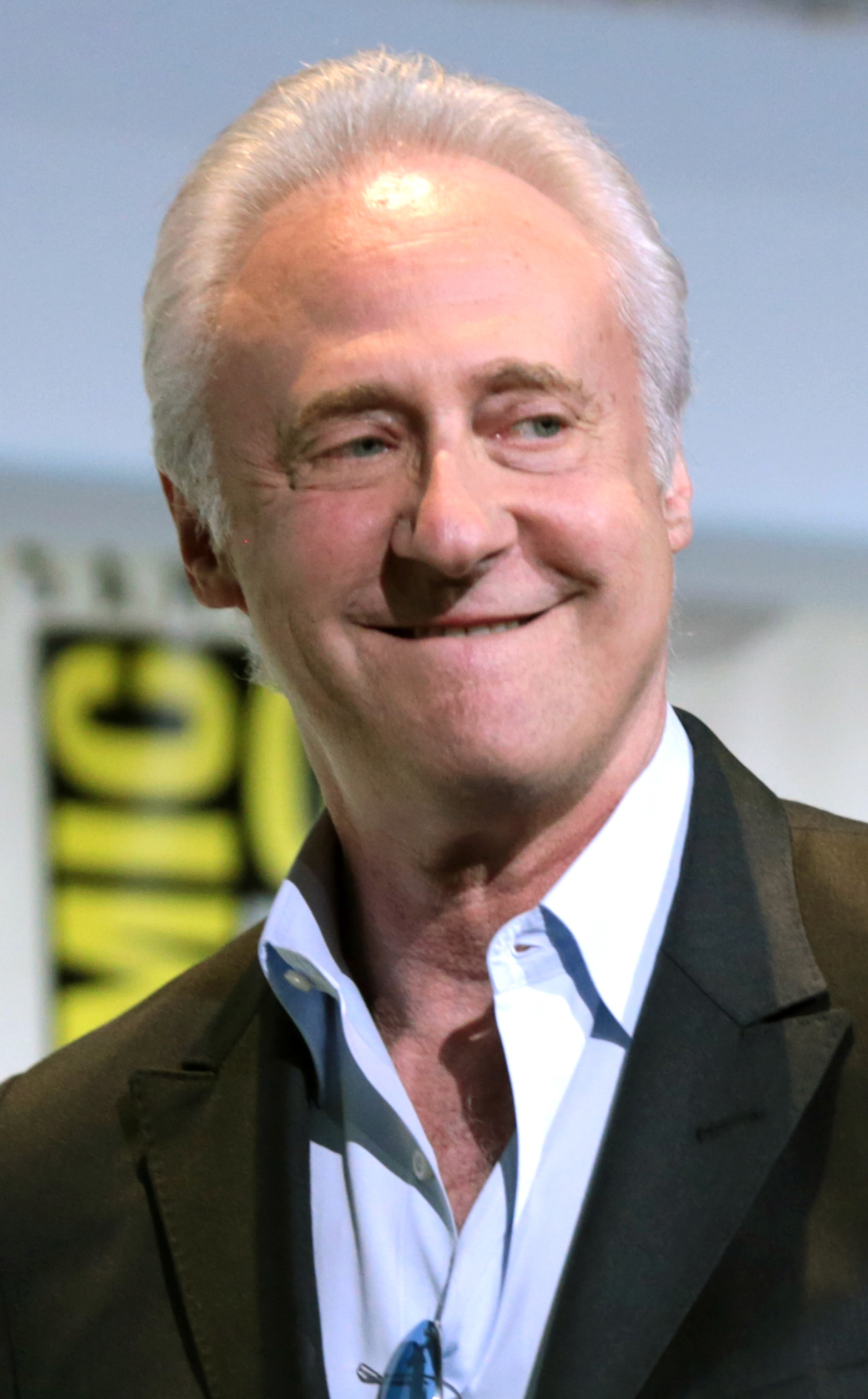
Actor Brent Spiner portrayed Data in Star Trek: The Next Generation.

It was in the Star Trek: Enterprise prequel episode "The Augments" that the origin of Data can be traced back to a scientific theory created by genetic engineer Arik Soong, ancestor to Data's "father/creator" Noonien Soong, who noted that his theory would take generations beyond his lifetime to develop into a practical working model. Arik Soong created the theory while serving life imprisonment for recreating the discontinued "Augments" program which originally started the Eugenics War of the late 20th century. This links the Data storyline to that of Khan Noonien Singh from the original Star Trek.

In "The Measure of a Man", a Starfleet judge rules that Data is not Starfleet property.

Data's family is expanded in "The Offspring", which introduces Lal, a gynoid based on Data's neural interface and whom Data refers to as his daughter. Lal "dies" shortly after activation. In "Brothers", Data reunites with Dr. Soong. There he meets again with Lore, who steals the emotion chip Soong meant for Data to receive. Lore then fatally wounds Soong. In "Descent", Lore returns, using the emotion chip to control Data and make him help with Lore's attempt to make the Borg entirely artificial lifeforms. Data eventually deactivates Lore, and recovers, but does not install the damaged emotion chip. In "Inheritance", Soong's former wife Juliana reunites with Data, though the crew discovers she was a gynoid duplicate built by Soong after the real Julianna's death, programmed to die after a long life, and to believe she is the true Julianna unaware of the fact she is an android. Faced with the decision, Data chooses not to disclose this to her and allows her to continue her normal life.

In "All Good Things...", the two-hour series finale of The Next Generation, Captain Picard travels among three different time periods. The Picard of 25 years into the future goes with Geordi La Forge to seek advice from now Professor Data, a luminary physicist who holds the Lucasian Chair at Cambridge University.

In the film Star Trek Generations, Data finally installs the emotion chip he retrieved from Lore, and experiences the full scope of emotions. However, those emotions proved difficult to control and Data struggled to master them. In Star Trek: First Contact, Data has managed to gain complete control of the chip, which includes deactivating it to maintain his performance efficiency. In the film Star Trek: Nemesis, Data beams Picard off an enemy ship before destroying it, sacrificing himself and saving the captain and crew of the Enterprise. However, Data had copied his core memories into B-4, his lost brother who is introduced in the movie. This was done with the reluctant help of La Forge, who voiced concerns about how this could cause B-4 to be nothing more than an exact duplicate of Data.

In the first season of Star Trek: Picard, Data is seen in Picard's dreams, playing poker with him in Ten-Forward, and later painting in the middle of the vineyards of Chateau Picard. It is revealed that Dahj and Soji Asha are Data's daughters, created through fractal neuronic cloning, a procedure developed by Dr. Bruce Maddox. These neurons were apparently salvaged from B-4, who had been dismantled and placed in storage after his positronic net was found to be too primitive to integrate Data's memories. However, Data's consciousness is revealed to still exist inside a quantum simulation crafted by Maddox and based upon memories retrieved from the neurons Maddox salvaged from B-4, the equipment holding the network now in the possession of Altan Soong, Noonien Soong's biological son. After Picard dies, Altan Soong transfers Picard's consciousness into a golem intended for his own consciousness and Picard meets with Data inside the simulation. Data requests that Picard terminate his consciousness, which would allow Data the experience of dying, believing that he could only truly live if he had a finite lifespan. Once Picard awakens, he carries out Data's wish and Data's consciousness rapidly ages to death, Picard giving a brief eulogy as he observes that what made Data remarkable was his ability to see humanity's worst traits and still aspire to the best parts of the human condition.

In the third season of Star Trek: Picard, Data is revealed to have been revived by Altan within a new synthetic body, having partially merged with Lore, B-4, and the memories of Altan Soong himself. It's believed by Riker that while Data's memories had previously been unrecoverable, the lifting of the ban on synthetics had allowed Soong to work on it more and properly extract them from B-4. The new android was requisitioned by the Daystrom Institute, Starfleet's foremost advanced research center. Riker, Worf, and Raffi Musiker steal the android, and bring him aboard the USS Titan, where he is reunited with Picard. The android entity holds valuable information on Daystrom's research projects, and Data's persona reveals that the antagonists of the season have stolen Picard's original dead organic body. However, it takes several hours for La Forge to re-engineer the android to allow Data's persona to truly dominate it, with Lore's persona dominating in the meantime. Data's persona is seemingly unable to overpower Lore who has taken over the Titan's systems, but upon realizing that Lore envied the compassion and empathy Data developed from his memories, Data eventually surrenders them to Lore. Lore initially regards them as his battle trophies; they consume him, reintegrating Lore and reconstituting Data, allowing him to fully take over the new body and reprogram the Titan's systems against the Changelings. Data's personality is thus newly enriched, and attains its most human-like state with Data stating that he is Data, but also Lore, B-4, Lal and everything else that Soong had programmed into the android.

In the series final episodes, the Changelings are revealed to be working with the Borg who take over Starfleet. Data plays an instrumental role in the defeat of the Borg, piloting the rebuilt USS Enterprise-D to the heart of a Borg cube over Jupiter on a gut feeling, a feat that La Forge had believed to be impossible for even a computer or the best pilot to accomplish. Afterwards, Data attempts to adjust to having an artificial organic body and everything that comes with it and is last seen playing poker with his Enterprise crewmates at the Ten Forward bar in Los Angeles.

In Star Trek: Lower Decks season 5's "Fully Dilated," an alternate universe version of Data gets trapped in the prime universe. This version of Data, who is purple, is still active in 2382 rather than having been destroyed years earlier and serves on the Enterprise-D which is similarly still intact. The alternate Data is shown to share many of his prime counterpart's traits and even some of his experiences, such as a close friendship with Geordi La Forge and getting trapped in 19th century San Francisco. After the Enterprise briefly crosses into the prime universe via a mysterious interdimensional rift "while battling some evil clones of Tasha Yar, or something," Data is left behind and his shuttle crashes on Dilmer III, a pre-industrial planet experiencing time dilation. Data's head -- the only part of his body to survive -- is recovered by Starfleet lieutenants Beckett Mariner, D'Vana Tendi, and T'Lyn, but a transporter mishap strands them on the planet for a year of relative time. During this period, Tendi finds a way to power Data's head and reactivate him and he provides her with advice and help with her science. Data is eventually beamed to the USS Cerritos where he recommends both Tendi and T'Lyn for the open senior science officer position. The crew load Data's head into a torpedo casing and fire it back through the rift to be recovered by the Enterprise on the other side.

=== Spot ===
Spot is Data's pet cat and a recurring character in the show. Spot appears in several episodes during TNG's last four seasons, as well as in the feature films Star Trek Generations and Star Trek: Nemesis. She first appears in the episode "Data's Day". Spot originally appears as a male Somali cat, but later appears as a female orange tabby cat, eventually giving birth to kittens (TNG, "Genesis"). In Star Trek: Picard, his memories of Spot are the last ones that Data "surrenders" to Lore.

== Popular culture ==
Like Spock, Data became a sex symbol and Spiner's fan mail came mostly from women. He described the letters as "romantic mail" that were "really written to Data; he's a really accessible personality".

Robotics engineers regard Data (along with the droids from the Star Wars movies) as the pre-eminent face of robots in the public's perception of their field. On April 9, 2008, Data was inducted into Carnegie Mellon University's Robot Hall of Fame during a ceremony at the Carnegie Science Center in Pittsburgh, Pennsylvania.

Spiner himself released an album of old pop standards from the 1930s and 1940s entitled Ol' Yellow Eyes Is Back, a reference to the contact lenses he wore as Data, as well as a play on the name of the Frank Sinatra album, Ol' Blue Eyes Is Back.
