= Christine Bieselin Clark =

American costume designer

- Born: Christine Bieselin
- Education: Suffolk County Community College, Stony Brook University
- Occupation: Costume designer
- Website: www.christineclarkdesign.com

Christine Bieselin Clark is an American costume designer known for her work on Tron: Legacy, Ender's Game, and Spy. She was nominated in 2022 for the Emmy Award for Outstanding Fantasy/Sci-Fi Costumes for her work on Star Trek: Picard.

== Biography ==
Bieselin Clark, who spent her youth on Long Island, New York is an alumna of Suffolk County Community College, and graduated in theater arts from the Stony Brook University. She began working as a theatre costume designer for productions throughout the East Coast. Her career in the film industry started in 1997, when she joined the production of Deceiver as an intern costume designer.

Bieselin Clark worked during the 2000s as an assistant costume designer on films including In Her Shoes, 300, Watchmen, and X-Men Origins: Wolverine. According to Entertainment Weekly, "she broke out as a sci-fi costume designer on TRON: Legacy" For this 2010 movie, she worked with Michael Wilkinson (whom she names as her mentor) in designing the lighted costumes, which used electroluminescent lamps derived from a flexible polymer film and featured hexagonal patterns. Bieselin Clark told Wired that the costumes of the virtual reality siren characters are a "play on feminine shapes and then made [to] look like cars," adding:

"We wanted an auto-body kind of finish so the characters' curves feel like metal. We used metallic paint and pigment and things you would use on motor vehicles and created a fabric that we invented for this process. When you put those little touches of light in there, it just becomes a whole other being, almost."

For her costume work on TRON: Legacy, she was nominated for the 2010 Costume Designers Guild Award. The film's costume designs influenced the men's 2010 Donatella Versace collection.

Her first job as the lead costume designer for a major film was on Ender's Game. The costume helmets comprised three magnet-connected sections; it was important that the visor be easy to remove because of reflections during filming. Creating the helmets involved a 3D scan of each actor's head, so that a computer program could adapt the helmet shape to the head; the shape was then resin printed.

For her costume work on Star Trek: Picard, Bieselin Clark was nominated for the 2020 Costume Designers Guild Award, and in 2022, for the Emmy Award for Outstanding Fantasy/Sci-Fi Costumes. When first approaching the costumes for this series, Bieselin Clark looked at costumes from throughout Star Trek as research. She wanted to humanize Jean-Luc Picard and show more vulnerability through his clothing. She also wanted to depict the changes that the character underwent in decades after the time of Star Trek: The Next Generation. An example of the latter comes in the episode "Absolute Candor", which begins with a flashback to Picard's time in Starfleet where he is seen in a white suit with his Starfleet badge. This is contrasted later in the episode when he returns to the planet in rugged, darker clothing that matches the changes in his personality and in the state of the universe.
