= Kew High School =

Location
- 1393 Burke Road; Kew East, Victoria, 3102; Australia; 37.7953°S 145.0626°E

Information
- Type: Co-educational
- Motto: Aspire. Strive. Achieve
- Founded: 1963
- Principal: Andrew Moffat
- Years offered: 7–12
- Enrolment: 1038 (2024)
- Campus type: Suburban
- Houses: Barker (Baan), Boroondara, Cotham (Wiin), Wilsmere (Bunjil)
- Colours: Maroon and gold
- Website: www.kew.vic.edu.au

Kew High School is a co-educational school in suburban Melbourne for students in years 7–12.

The school has an enrolment of approximately 1146 students from the suburbs of Kew, Kew East, Balwyn North, Balwyn, Deepdene, Alphington, Ivanhoe, Ivanhoe East, Eaglemont and Bulleen.

== School grounds and facilities ==
The school is situated on a single campus adjoining parkland in the suburb of Kew East, approximately 8 kilometres from Melbourne CBD. Facilities of the school include

- The Renaissance Centre, a performing arts centre which is used for the bi-annual school production and music and drama classes.
- A large gymnasium - including a gym and 2 multipurpose basketball/volleyball courts
- A Senior School (VCE) Centre for the use of Year 11 and 12 students
- An outdoor canteen and adjoining indoor dining area
- A library
- Three outdoor basketball courts and two soccer pitches with artificial surfaces
- Specialised facilities for STEM, music, food technology, visual arts, drama and languages

== Music ==
The school's theatre "The Renaissance Centre" is regularly used by other schools and community organisations for performances with a capacity of 470 people.

A recording of a choir from the school singing "Come Together" by The Beatles was sampled for the Avalanches' 2016 album Wildflower.

== House system ==
| House name | House motif | House colour |
|---|---|---|
| Barker - Baan | Bulls | Blue |
| Boroondara | Bears | Green |
| Cotham - Wiin | Devils | Red |
| Wilsmere - Bunjil | Warriors | Yellow |

== Notable alumni ==
- Robert DiPierdomenico — former Australian rules footballer with Hawthorn
- Pez — Australian hip hop recording artist from Melbourne, Australia
- Dom Dolla — Australian house music producer
- Adam Gotsis — Australian professional American footballer
- Jessica Dal Pos — Australian rules footballer with Greater Western Sydney and Carlton
- Evan Evagora — the first Australian to be a regular cast member on a TV series in the Star Trek franchise
- Sam Pang — entertainment personality
- Ron Mueck — sculptor
- Richard Walter — former Australian rules footballer with Hawthorn
