= Evan Evagora =

Australian actor

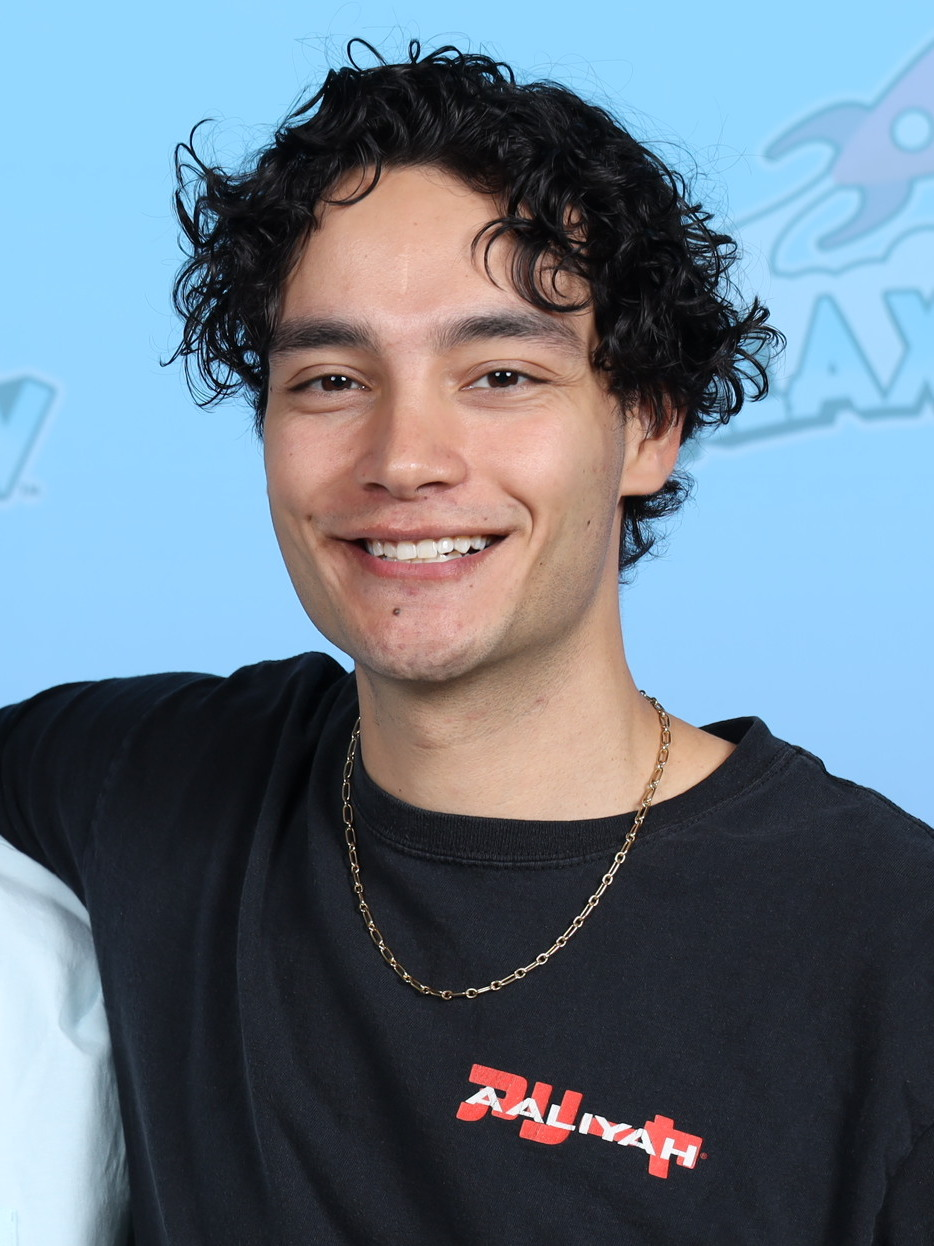
- Evagora at GalaxyCon Austin in 2023
- Born: Melbourne, Australia
- Education: Kew High School
- Occupations: Actor, model
- Years active: 2019–present

Evan Evagora is an Australian actor and model. He is best known for his role as the Romulan character Elnor, on the television series Star Trek: Picard (2020–2022).

== Early life ==
Evagora was born in Melbourne, the youngest of seven children born to Marie and Xristos. His parents both migrated to Australia: his mother, who is of Cook Islands Māori descent, from New Zealand when she was 20, and his father from Cyprus when he was three.

Evagora grew up in Melbourne, where he went to Kew High School. His interests at school included sport, particularly boxing and Australian rules football. He also took an interest in theatre, writing a play in which he took the part of Rove McManus.

Evagora appeared to be destined for a sports career. He won a state boxing championship, and played for Fitzroy Football Club in both Victorian Amateur Football Association and in semi-professional Victorian Football League games. After school he spent a year travelling around Europe with friends. Evagora then went to film school in South Melbourne.

== Career ==
While at film school Evagora was scouted as a model by a company that represents models and actors. He later moved to Sydney for his acting, followed by a move to Los Angeles.

Evagora played the role of Nick Taylor in the film Fantasy Island, which was released in February 2020.

Evagora has a starring role in Star Trek: Picard as Elnor, a Romulan hand-to-hand combat expert. He is the first Australian to be a regular cast member on a TV series in the Star Trek franchise. His role quickly received a "Space Legolas" nickname from Internet users, based on similarities with the character from The Lord of the Rings films, including the name style. In an Australian magazine interview published in November 2019, Evagora said he would be filming season two of Star Trek: Picard in 2020. Evagora and several other cast members were cut from the show's third and final season, which included the return of six actors from the main cast of Star Trek: The Next Generation, due to budget limitations.

== Filmography ==
=== Film ===
Year	Title	Role	Notes
2020	Fantasy Island	Nick Taylor	
2025	Anomaly	Austin	Short film; also co-producer

=== Television ===
Year	Title	Role	Notes
2019	Secret City	Patron	Uncredited, episode: "Broken Bird"
2020–22	Star Trek: Picard	Elnor	Main cast (seasons 1–2)
2020, 2022	The Ready Room	Himself	2 episodes
2021	Home and Away	Mike	1 episode

=== Video games ===
Year	Title	Role	Notes
2022	The Quarry	Nicholas "Nick" Furcillo	Voice, motion capture and likeness
