= Denise Crosby =

American actress

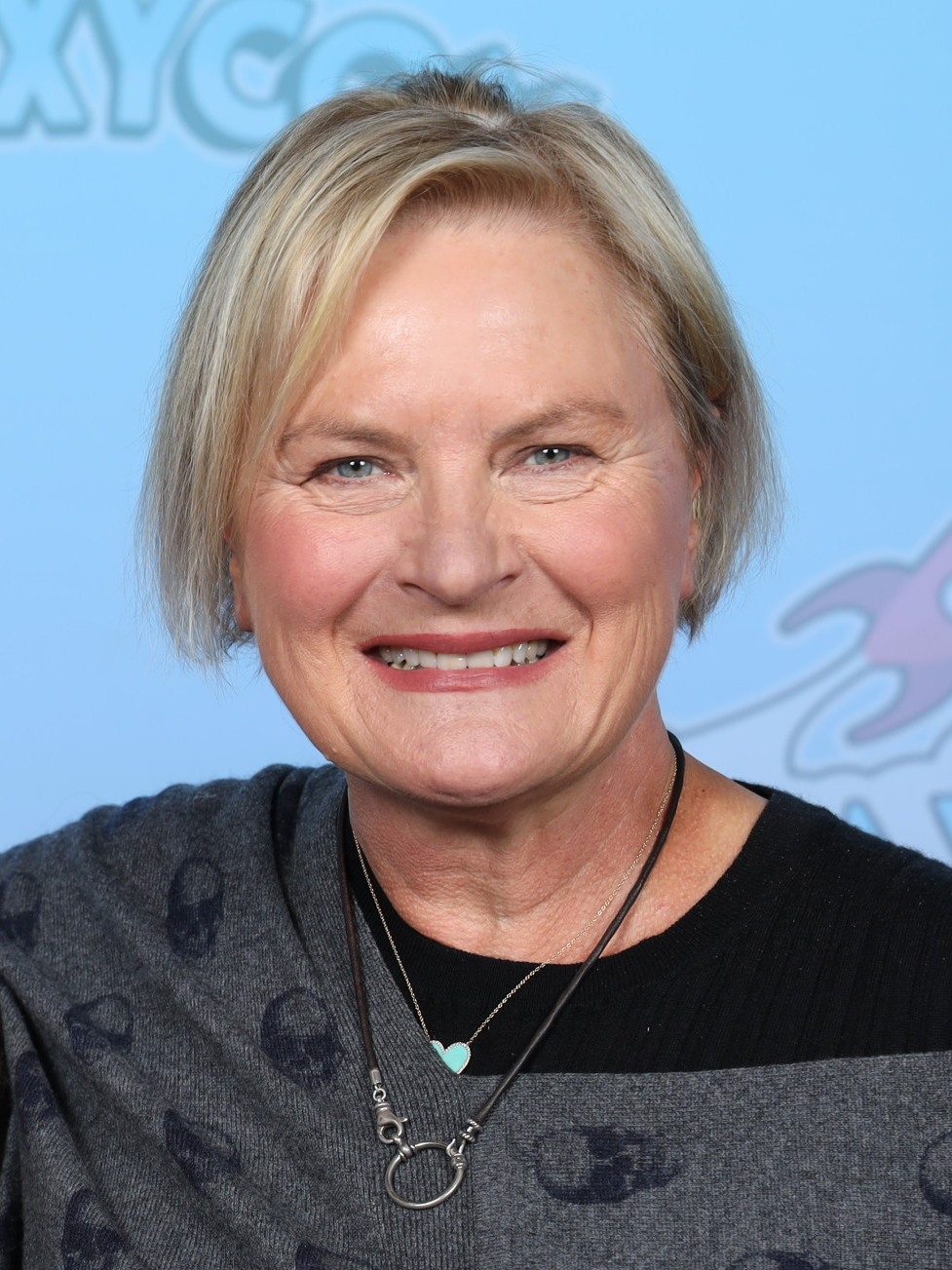
- Crosby at GalaxyCon Columbus in 2023
- Born: Denise Michelle Crosby; November 24, 1957 (age 68); Hollywood, California, US
- Occupations: Actress; model
- Years active: 1979–present
- Known for: Star Trek: The Next Generation
- Spouses: Geoffrey Edwards (m. 1983; div. 1990); Ken Sylk (m. 1995)
- Children: 1
- Father: Dennis Crosby
- Relatives: Bing Crosby (paternal grandfather); Dixie Lee (paternal grandmother)

Denise Michelle Crosby (born November 24, 1957) is an American actress and model known for portraying Security Chief Tasha Yar mainly in season one of Star Trek: The Next Generation, and Yar's daughter, the half-Romulan Commander Sela, in subsequent seasons. She is also known for her numerous film and television roles and for starring in and producing the 1997 film Trekkies.

== Early life ==
Denise Crosby's paternal grandfather was Bing Crosby and her father was Bing's son, Dennis Crosby.

Crosby graduated in 1975 from Hollywood High School, followed by Cabrillo College, where she studied theater. She dropped out of college after she was interviewed by a local paper and revealed her famous family background: "One of the drama teachers used the story to illustrate to the class that this crap is what Hollywood's all about, using people's names to get somewhere. I was very, very hurt by it. So I just checked out." She started modeling and in 1979, posed nude for the March issue of Playboy magazine, which she called "some kind of rebellion on my part, some way of saying screw you to the family image".

== Career ==
Crosby's choice of career solidified at an early age and was influenced by her grandfather Bing Crosby and her father Dennis Crosby. Crosby's first high-profile role was as Lisa Davis on the soap opera Days of Our Lives. She has appeared as Dr. Gretchen Kelley in three episodes of Lois & Clark: The New Adventures of Superman and as a sheriff on The Adventures of Brisco County, Jr. episode "No Man's Land".

In the early 1990s, she played the role of the mayor in the short-lived series Key West. She also appeared in two episodes of the cable television series Red Shoe Diaries, playing a different character in each episode. Crosby had a small, recurring role in Aaron Spelling's primetime drama, Models Inc, a spin-off from Melrose Place. She was a guest star on the eighth season of The X-Files for two episodes, in which she plays a doctor who examined Agent Scully's baby. In 1991, she was a guest star in "The Deadly Nightshade", a first-season The Flash episode as Dr. Rebecca Frost.

In 2001, Crosby appeared in two episodes of NYPD Blue as the abrasive Lieutenant Susan Dalto. In 2006, she was a guest star in "Popping Cherry", the third episode of the first season of Dexter, appearing via flashback as Dexter Morgan's first victim. Crosby had a recurring role in Southland as Detective Dan "Sal" Salinger's wife.

One of her first film appearances was in the 1982 Nick Nolte/Eddie Murphy film 48 Hrs. This was followed by a small role in the 1982 film Trail of the Pink Panther, which she reprised in the sequel Curse of the Pink Panther. In 1985, Crosby appeared in the music videos for Chris Isaak's song "Dancin'" and Michael McDonald's song "No Lookin' Back". In 1986, she appeared in the music video for Black Sabbath's song "No Stranger to Love". In the same year, she played a robotics engineer, Nora Hunter, in the science-fiction movie Eliminators. She starred in Stephen King's Pet Sematary, played the lead role in Dolly Dearest in 1991, and also appeared in Deep Impact and Quentin Tarantino's Jackie Brown. Her other film roles included the 2002 Western horror film Legend of the Phantom Rider, and the 2005 Tobe Hooper horror film Mortuary.

=== Star Trek ===
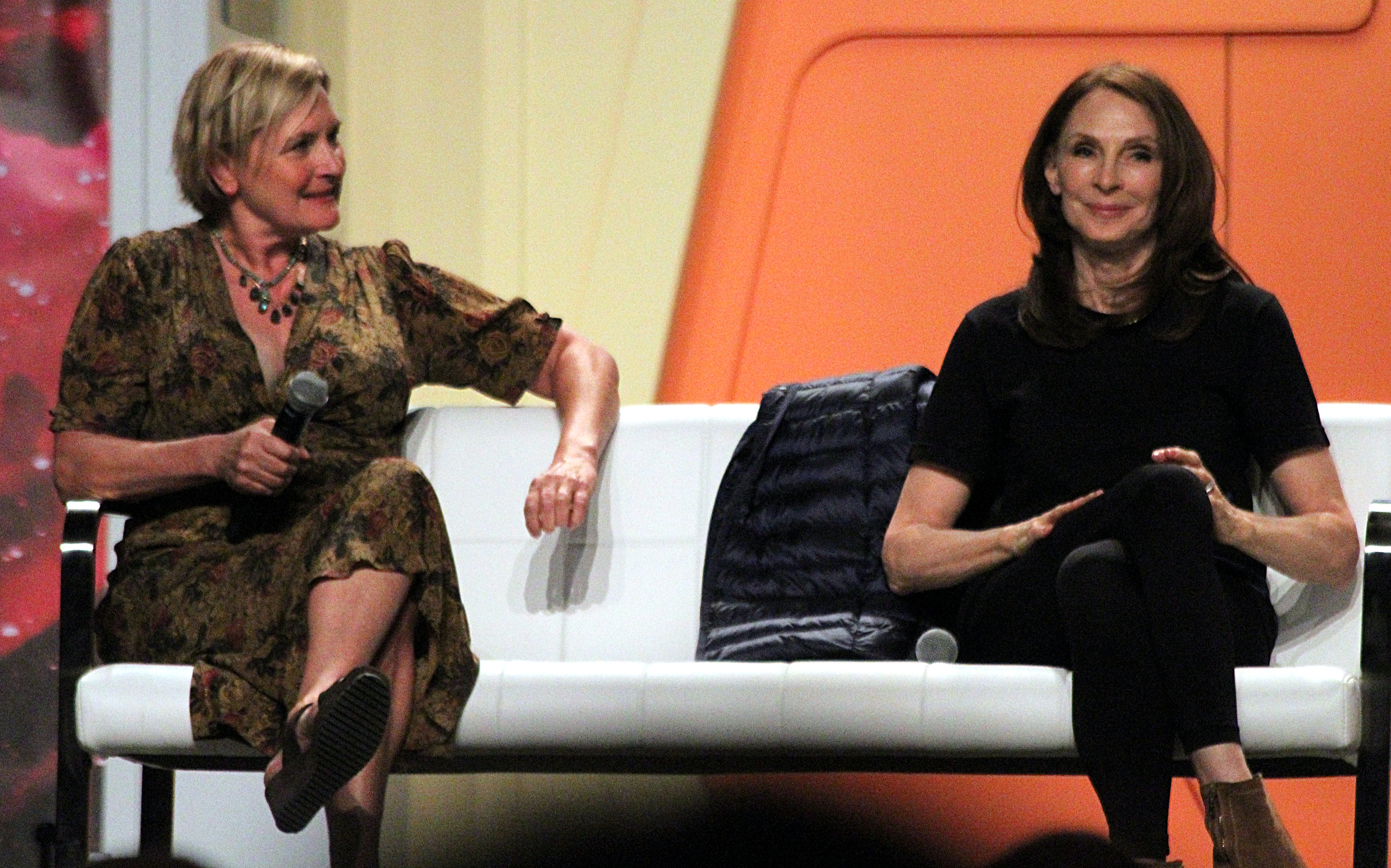
Crosby with Star Trek co-star Gates McFadden in 2017

In 1987, Crosby was cast in the role of Tasha Yar for the much-publicized return of Star Trek to television in the syndicated series Star Trek: The Next Generation. She had been chosen to play Counselor Deanna Troi before Gene Roddenberry switched the role to Marina Sirtis. Initially one of the top-billed characters and featured prominently in episodes such as "The Naked Now" and "Code of Honor", the role of Tasha gradually moved into the background as other members of the ensemble cast became a greater focus of the series. Crosby reportedly grew disillusioned with her role because of its "Uhura-like" status: "I was struggling with not being able to do much with the character. I had all these ideas and couldn't do them. I was just stage dressing." Ultimately, Crosby decided to leave the show. Her character was killed by the alien creature Armus during the episode "Skin of Evil". She had appeared in 22 episodes when she left.

In later years, Crosby approached the TNG production team with the idea of reprising her role of Tasha Yar. This came to be in season-three's "Yesterday's Enterprise", in which an alternate timeline is created after the USS Enterprise-C, the predecessor to TNG's USS Enterprise-D, comes forward 22 years in time, just before it was to be destroyed. Yar joined the Enterprise-C before it returned to its own time to restore the original timeline. During the documentary Trekkies, Crosby commented that her Tasha Yar character had to die to get "the best episodes".

Crosby also guest-starred in several other TNG episodes, including "Redemption" and "Unification" as Romulan Commander Sela, the half-human, half-Romulan daughter of Tasha Yar, who had been taken prisoner in the past while on board the Enterprise-C. Crosby later reprised the role in the Star Trek: Armada video game and played Tasha again in the series finale, "All Good Things...", in which Captain Picard is moving back and forth through time and encounters Tasha during the events just prior to the pilot episode.

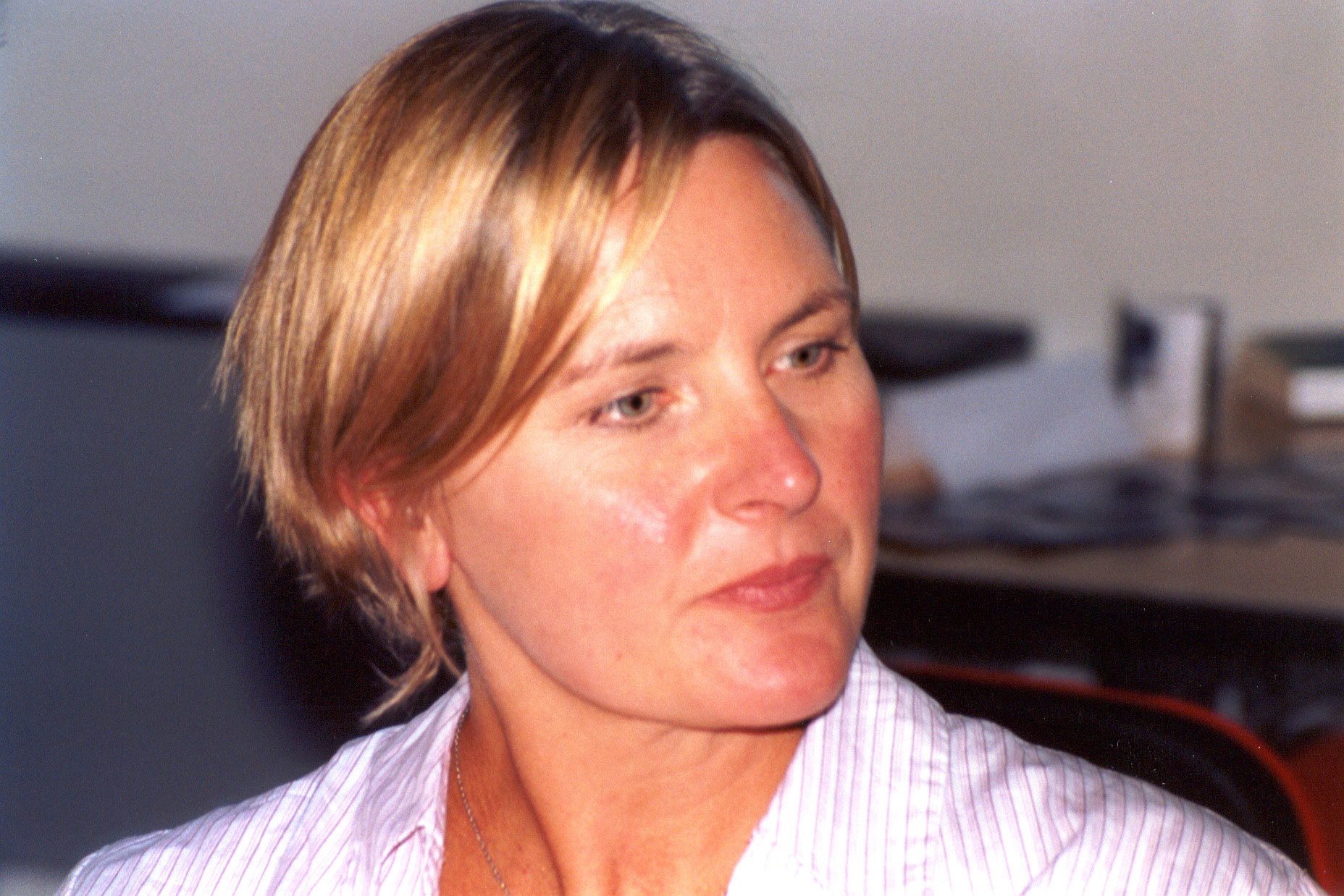
Crosby in 2003

Crosby co-produced and narrated the 1997 documentary Trekkies, followed by the 2003 sequel Trekkies 2. Both films star Crosby, who conducts interviews with devotees of Star Trek, more commonly known as "Trekkies". As of 2017, she was reportedly working on a sequel called Trekkies 3.

Along with other Star Trek actors, she has also appeared in the "Blood and Fire" episode of the fan-produced series Star Trek: New Voyages, playing Dr. Jenna Yar (grandmother of Tasha Yar).

In 2013, Crosby provided voicing for the characters of Tasha Yar and Sela in the Cryptic Studios MMORPG Star Trek Online. Crosby became the first of a new wave of several Star Trek alumni to return to the roles they originated since Leonard Nimoy's participation at the game's launch in 2010.

=== Post-Star Trek work ===
In January and February 2010, Crosby performed alongside Gale Harold and ex-model Claudia Mason in Tennessee Williams' Orpheus Descending at Theater in Los Angeles. The production and cast received mostly positive reviews in the Los Angeles Times, which stated, "Harold, ideally cast, beautifully ignites with Crosby, whose unconventional interpretation is an affecting revelation."

Crosby has a recurring role on Showtime's 2013 series Ray Donovan. In 2014, she appeared in three episodes of AMC's The Walking Dead as Mary, a member of a group of cannibals. The character first appears in the penultimate episode of season four, "Us", and made her final appearance in the season-five premiere, "No Sanctuary".

Crosby also played the role of widow Margie Curtis in the TV series Bones, season three, episode four, "The Secret in the Soil". She played the role of Special Master Faye Richardson in the legal drama Suits in its final season.

== Personal life ==
Crosby was married to Geoffrey Edwards, son of director Blake Edwards, from 1983 to 1990. She appeared in a number of her former father-in-law's films, including 10, Skin Deep, Trail of the Pink Panther, and Curse of the Pink Panther.

Crosby married actor Ken Sylk in 1995. They have a son.

== Filmography ==
=== Film ===
Year	Title	Role	Notes
1979	10	Party Guest	Uncredited role
1982	Trail of the Pink Panther	Denise, Bruno's Moll	
1982	48 Hrs.	Sally	
1983	Curse of the Pink Panther	Denise	
1983	The Man Who Loved Women	Enid	
1985	Desert Hearts	Pat	
1986	Eliminators	Nora Hunter	
1988	Greasy Lake	Bad Girl #2	Direct-to-video
1988	Arizona Heat	Jill Andrews	
1988	Miracle Mile	Landa	
1989	Skin Deep	Angie	
1989	Pet Sematary	Rachel Creed	
1989	Tennessee Waltz	Sally Lomas	
1991	High Strung	Melanie	
1991	Dolly Dearest	Marilyn Wade	
1993	Mafia Docks/Desperate Crimes	Bella Blu	Italian title: Il ritmo del silenzio
1994	Max	Jayne Blake	
1994	Relative Fear	Connie Madison	
1995	Mutant Species	Carol-Anne	
1995	Dream Man	Barbara	Direct-to-video
1997	Executive Power	Christine Rolands	Direct-to-video
1997	Jackie Brown	Public Defender	Uncredited role
1998	Deep Impact	Vicky Hotchner	
1998	Divorce: A Contemporary Western	Kay	
2002	Legend of the Phantom Rider	Sarah Jenkins	
2003	The Bus Stops Here	Chatty Woman at Bus Stop	Short film
2005	Mortuary	Leslie Doyle	
2007	Ripple Effect	Ronald's Wife	Uncredited role
2007	Born	Catherine	
2012	Birth Mother	Detective Johnson	Short film
2013	The Exterminator	Linda	
2015	Dark Intentions	Beth's Mother	aka Don't Wake Mummy
2017	Unearthed & Untold: The Path to Pet Sematary	Herself	Documentary film
2019	Itsy Bitsy	Sheriff Jane	

=== Television ===
Year	Title	Role	Notes
1980	Days of Our Lives	Lisa Davis	3 episodes
1983	Cocaine: One Man's Seduction	Teller	Television film
1985	My Wicked, Wicked Ways: The Legend of Errol Flynn	Diana Dyrenforth	Television film
1985	Stark	Kim Parker	Television film
1985	Malice in Wonderland	Carole Lombard	Television film
1986	The Family Martinez	Rachael McCann	Television film
1986	L.A. Law	Joan Turtletaub	Episode: "Gibbon Take"
1987	Ohara	Rachel Winters	Episode: "Laura"
1987–1994	Star Trek: The Next Generation	Lieutenant Tasha Yar	26 episodes
1987–1994	Star Trek: The Next Generation	Sela	3 episodes + 1 Voice only episode
1989	Mancuso, F.B.I.	Toni Simmons	Episode: "I Cover the Waterfront"
1991	WIOU	Unknown role	Episode: "Labored Relations"
1991	Hunter	Pam Sutton	Episode: "All That Glitters"
1991	The Flash	Dr. Rebecca Frost	Episode: "The Deadly Nightshade"
1991	Dark Justice	Christina Forbes	Episode: "Forbes for the Defense"
1992	Jack's Place	Lindsay	Episode: "Everything Old is New Again"
1992–1994	Red Shoe Diaries	Officer Lynn "Mona" McCabe / The Psychiatrist	Episodes: "You Have The Right to Remain Silent", "The Psychiatrist"
1993	Civil Wars	Gwen Leary	Episode: "Captain Kangaroo Court"
1993	Key West	Chaucy Caldwell	13 episodes
1993	Johnny Bago	Dr. Candace David	Episode: "Hail the Conquering Marrow"
1993	The Adventures of Brisco County, Jr.	Sheriff Jenny Taylor	Episode: "No Man's Land"
1994	Models Inc.	Ursula Edwards	Episode: "Good Girls Finish Last"
1994–1995	Lois & Clark: The New Adventures of Superman	Dr. Gretchen Kelley	3 episodes
1995–1996	Diagnosis: Murder	Didi Harris / Cynthia Holling	3 episodes
1996	Dr. Quinn, Medicine Woman	Isabelle Maynard	Episode: "Fear Itself"
1997	Baywatch	Emily Morgan	Episode: "Rendezvous"
1998	Spy Game	Chrysalis	Episode: "Go, Girl"
1998	Pumpkin Man	Laurel Hollway	Television short film
1998	Chance of a Lifetime	Katie	Television film
1999	The Rockford Files: If It Bleeds... It Leads	Mrs. Muller	Television film
2000	Snoops	Evelyn Houtch	Episode: "The Stolen Diskette"
2000	Family Law	Doris Collins	Episode: "For Love"
2001	The Drew Carey Show	Officer Hayes	Episode: "The Warsaw Closes"
2001	NYPD Blue	Lieutenant Susan Dalto	Episodes: "Thumb Enchanted Evening", "Flight of Fancy"
2001	The X-Files	Dr. Mary Speake	Episodes: "Empedocles", "Essence"
2001	Judging Amy	Mrs. Nasretian	Episode: "Look Closer"
2002	JAG	Mrs. Dietz	Episode: "Capital Crime"
2002	The Division	Alison Tisdale	Episode: "This Thing Called Love"
2002	The Agency	Detective Reidy	Episode: "Sleeping Dogs Lie"
2003	Threat Matrix	Gillian Sadler	Episode: "Cold Cash"
2004	Crossing Jordan	Carla Moran	Episode: "Fire from the Sky"
2005	Eyes	Justine Canning	Episode: "Shots"
2006	Dexter	Nurse Mary	Episode: "Popping Cherry"
2007	Bones	Margie Curtis	Episode: "The Secret in the Soil"
2008	Mad Men	Gertie	Episodes: "For Those Who Think Young", "The Benefactor"
2008	Prison Break	Doctor	Episode: "Going Under"
2009	Family Guy	Herself	Episode: "Not All Dogs Go to Heaven"
2009–2010	Southland	Susan Salinger	3 episodes
2011	Law & Order: LA	Diana Burt	Episode: "Big Rock Mesa"
2013	Invasion Roswell	Linda	Television film
2013–2017	Ray Donovan	Deb	15 episodes
2014	The Walking Dead	Mary	(Seasons 4–5) 3 episodes
2015	Scandal	Janet Holland	Episode: "Even the Devil Deserves a Second Chance"
2016	The Magicians	Genji	Episode: "Mendings, Major and Minor"
2016	Castle	Dr. Marion Baker	Episode: "Death Wish"
2016	The Watcher	Jeanne	Television film
2019	NCIS: Los Angeles	Tisha Long	Episode: "The One That Got Away", "The Guardian"
2019	Suits	Faye Richardson	Recurring Role; Season 9
2021	Creepshow	Professor Trollenberg	Season 2, Episode 4: Pipe Screams/Within The Walls Of Madness
2022	NCIS	SECNAV Hattie Taylor	Season 19, Episode 10: "Pledge of Allegiance"
2022	General Hospital	Carolyn Webber	Guest role; October 31–November 2, 2022 & January 20-February 3, 2023

=== Producer ===
Year	Title	Role	Notes
1997	Trekkies	Co-executive producer	
2004	Trekkies 2	Executive producer	

=== Video games ===
Year	Title	Role	Notes
2000	Star Trek: Armada	Sela	Voice role
2010	Star Trek Online	Lieutenant Tasha Yar / Sela	Voice role Uncredited role
2017	XCOM 2: War of the Chosen	Betos	Voice role

=== Web series ===
Year	Title	Role	Notes
2009	Star Trek: New Voyages	Dr. Jenna Yar	Episode: "Blood and Fire: Part 2"
