= Trekkies (film) =

1997 film by Roger Nygard

- Original movie poster
- Directed by: Roger Nygard
- Produced by: W.K. Border
- Starring: Denise Crosby
- Cinematography: Harris Done
- Edited by: Roger Nygard
- Music by: J.J. Holiday; Billy Sullivan; Walter Wertzowa; Jimmie Wood
- Production companies: Neo Art & Logic
- Distributed by: Paramount Classics
- Release date: October 18, 1997
- Running time: 86 minutes
- Country: United States
- Language: English
- Budget: $375,000 (estimated)

Trekkies is a 1997 documentary film directed by Roger Nygard about the devoted fans of Gene Roddenberry's Star Trek. It is the first film released by Paramount Vantage, then known as Paramount Classics, and is presented by Denise Crosby, best known for her portrayal of Security Chief Tasha Yar on the first season of Star Trek: The Next Generation.

== Contents ==
The film contains interviews with Star Trek devotees, more commonly known as Trekkies. The fans range from people who dress as Klingons to members of Brent Spiner fan clubs including a club that was formed as a result of his role in the film.

== Production ==
After she worked with director Roger Nygard in his television film High Strung (1991), former Star Trek: The Next Generation actress Denise Crosby suggested that they should work together on a documentary regarding Star Trek fandom. (Note: Crosby portrayed season one main cast character Tasha Yar in The Next Generation.) Nygard thought it was a good idea and was surprised that it had not been done before. The first filming session took place at the Fantasticon science fiction convention at the Hilton Hotel in Los Angeles organized by William Campbell. (Note: Campbell appeared as Trelane in The Original Series episode "The Squire of Gothos" and as the Klingon captain Koloth in "The Trouble with Tribbles." His final appearance in Star Trek was in the Deep Space Nine episode "Blood Oath", where he reprised the role of Koloth.) Nygard felt that the footage from this first convention was good enough to warrant continuing with the project. The film was shot on 16 mm, with Nygard estimating the budget at $120,000.

== Release ==
Trekkies received a national release in the United States on May 21, 1999. It was in direct competition with Star Wars: Episode I – The Phantom Menace.

== Reception ==
Colin Covert gave three and a half stars in his review for the Star Tribune, adding that it was likely to shake up the viewer's opinions of Star Trek fans. He praised the structure of the film, with the initial "shock value" of each fan being followed up with further background to round out the portrait. Renee Graham at the Boston Globe gave a similar opinion, saying that despite the expectation of the reviewer, none of the opinions put forward by Trekkies felt like a "put-down". She summed up the documentary by saying "The Trekkie phenomenon may fall short of common definitions of normalcy, but as a film, 'Trekkies' sure beats sleeping outside for days to see a mediocre movie about some galaxy far, far away."

Regarding some of the film's more eccentric characters, The Tufts Daily film critic singled out Barbara Adams, a Star Trek uniform-wearing Trekkie that requests her fellow employees at Kinko's address her as "Commander." Adams turns out to be the so-called "Star Trek Juror," who was sworn-in as an alternate juror in the 1996 Clinton Whitewater hearings and wore her Starfleet uniform to court. Adams was ultimately dismissed from the Whitewater jury panel, not because of her Trek outfit, but for being interviewed after court by the TV news program American Journal about her devotion to the Star Trek television series. Also singled out by critics was mullet wearing, 15-year old computer expert Gabriel Köerner.

Bob Stauss, the film critic for the Los Angeles Daily News gave two and a half stars, saying that the documentary goes on too long and did not delve into the "real psychological issues raised by such obsessive interest". He added that the fans were "amusing for about 15 minutes, tops" and that the cumulative effect of watching the fans for that long was "numbing". James Verniere for the Boston Herald gave three stars, suggesting that Nygard may have found his niche as the "Michael Moore of weirdness" with this and his following film, Six Days in Roswell. Verniere suggested that Trekkies wasn't as definitive as the film Free Enterprise (1999) but described it as an "interesting, often hilarious piece of sociological comedy". Alicia Potter, also at the Boston Herald, described the film as "surreally funny".

On Rotten Tomatoes, the film holds a rating of 86% from 42 reviews with the consensus: "To fan or not to fawn over: this lifelong and prosperous journey into a sometimes cringeworthy world makes Trekkies the lovable center of its universe." Metacritic, which uses a weighted average, assigned the film a score of 64 out of 100, based on 17 critics, indicating "generally favorable" reviews.

== Sequels ==
In 2004, a sequel was released, titled Trekkies 2. This documentary travels throughout the world, mainly in Europe, to show fans of Star Trek from outside the United States. It also revisits memorable fans featured in the previous film.

Nygard sought to answer some of the criticism received from Trekkies in the sequel, in that he was accused of not showing "normal" fans. With this in mind, he attempted to include some degree of a description of what was normal fan behaviour and what was more unusual.

In an interview with TrekNews.net at the Star Trek Mission: New York convention in September 2016, Crosby talked about the potential for another documentary about Star Trek:

We do want to make a Trekkies 3. In earnest, we're hoping to get started in two more years. We have to time it with the rights and all the legal stuff. There's a lot of politics involved. We approached CBS/Viacom/Paramount [who own various rights to Star Trek] already and there's interest. So fingers crossed. When producing these documentaries, I'm always delighted by the surprise at something we didn't expect, such as the stories people tell and interacting with the fans, hearing stories. I never get tired of it..."

== Bibliography ==
- Gerrold, David (1973). The Trouble with Tribbles: The Birth, Sale and Final Production of one Episode (2004 BenBalla ed.). Dallas, TX: BenBalla Books. ISBN 9781939529565.
- Nemecek, Larry (2003). Star Trek: The Next Generation Companion (3rd ed.). New York: Pocket Books. ISBN 0-7434-5798-6.
