= High Strung =

High Strung may refer to:

- High Strung (1991 film), an American independent comedy film
- High Strung (2016 film), an American drama film
- The High Strung, an American rock band
- High-strung guitar, a guitar tuning also known as Nashville tuning
