= Roger Nygard =

American director, editor and producer

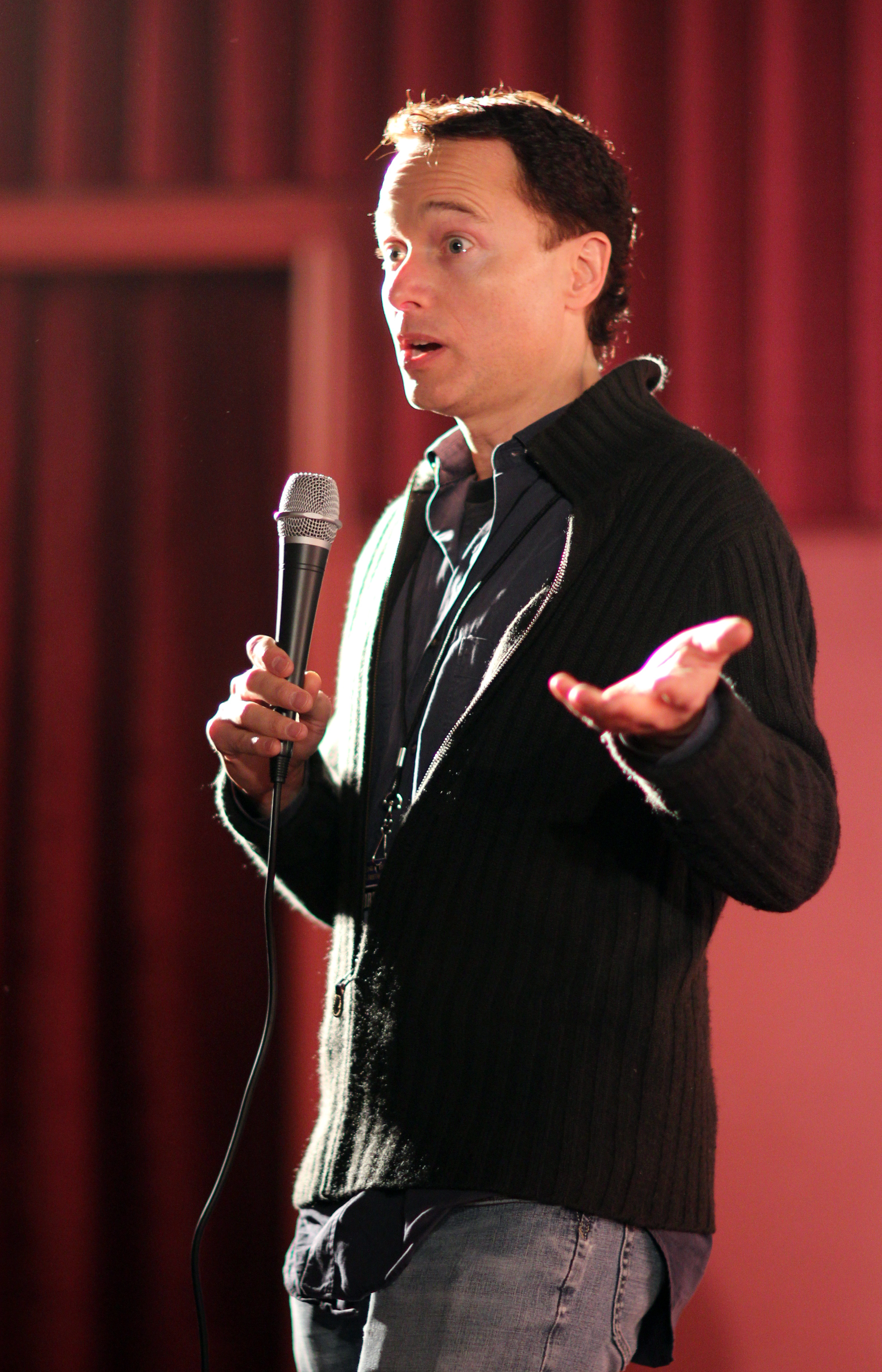
- Born: 28 March 1962 (age 64); Minneapolis, Minnesota, United States
- Occupations: Director, editor, writer, producer, author

Roger Nygard (born March 28, 1962) is an American director, editor, producer, and author. As a director he has worked on Tales of the Unknown (1990), High Strung (1991), Back to Back (1996), Trekkies (1997), and Suckers (2001). He also directed For Whom The Belt Tolls and What Would Jason Do?, episodes of The Bernie Mac Show, and Grief Counseling, an episode from the American television comedy series The Office.

His work as an editor includes Emmy-nominated episodes The Table Read, an episode from the American television comedy series Curb Your Enthusiasm, and Chicklet, an episode from the American television comedy series Veep, and Episode 102, an episode from the American television comedy series Who Is America?. He also edited episodes of The League, Grey's Anatomy, The Comedy Store, White House Plumbers, and The Residence.

== Background ==
Nygard was born on March 28, 1962, in Minneapolis, Minnesota. His introduction into film making started at the age of seven when he found his father's 8mm camera. It had half a film roll left and with it he shot his first film.

== Career ==
Nygard directed Trekkies which was released theatrically by Paramount Classics in 1999, as well as its follow up Trekkies 2 in 2004. He directed Suckers, a film which he co-wrote with Joe Yannetty. The film was a 2001 Video Premiere Award Winner in the Screenplay category. It was also an award winner in the "Special Jury Artistic Merit Award" category at the 2000 Cinequest Film Festival.

He directed and produced the 2010 documentary The Nature of Existence, which was described by The Hollywood Reporter as "his earnest attempt to find meaning in the universe." He spent four years traveling the world, conducting 175 interviews with an assortment of people from different backgrounds. Editing from 450 hours of footage was used for the final product.

In 2013, Nygard entered into a deal with Country Music Television to film a reality show pilot episode which would feature the family of Brother Jed an evangelist. Nygard first saw him preach at the University of Minnesota when he was attending the college.

He produced the 2020 documentary The Truth About Marriage, which was accompanied by a companion book. The Cinequest Film Festival called the film "...a powerful documentary steeped in philosophy, history, and psychology...." His next book Cut to the Monkey (2021) is about making and editing comedy series. His third book The Documentarian (2024) shares strategies for turning an idea for a documentary into a successful venture. Both recent books were published by Rowman & Littlefield, a subsidiary of Bloomsbury Publishing.

== Filmography (selective) ==
Director
Title	Year	Notes #
Tales of the Unknown (segment Warped)	1990	
High Strung	1991	
Back to Back	1996	
Trekkies	1997	Documentary
Six Days In Roswell	1999	Documentary
Suckers	2001	
Trekkies 2	2004	Documentary
CreepTales (segment Warped)	2004	
The Nature of Existence	2010	Documentary
The Relationship Doctrine of Don Blanquito	2012	Documentary
The Truth About Marriage	2020	Documentary
