= Gabriel Köerner =

- Born: Gabriel Charles Koerner; June 14, 1982 (age 43); Waterbury, Connecticut, U.S.
- Occupation(s): Visual effects artist, actor
- Known for: Trekkies

Gabriel Charles Köerner (born June 14, 1982, in Waterbury, Connecticut) is a visual effects artist and well-known Star Trek fan ("Trekkie"). Köerner appeared as a profilee in the documentary Trekkies (1997) and its sequel Trekkies 2 (2004), and went on to make guest appearances on The Drew Carey Show, as the "Star Trek Geek" on Beat the Geeks, and as an aficionado of Star Trek memorabilia in season 5 of Storage Wars.

As a VFX artist, he fulfilled his lifelong Star Trek dream by working on the series finale of Star Trek: Enterprise. He was a member of the teams that earned a Visual Effects Society Award nomination for Outstanding Models and Miniatures and a 2005 Emmy Award nomination for modeling work on the Sci-Fi Channel remake of Battlestar Galactica (2004). He also worked on the live-action film Speed Racer (2008).

Various scenes in Trekkies that feature Köerner were filmed in the town he lived in at the time, Bakersfield, California.
