= Trekkies 2 =

- DVD cover
- Directed by: Roger Nygard
- Produced by: Michael Leahy
- Starring: Denise Crosby
- Cinematography: David Doyle
- Edited by: Roger Nygard
- Music by: J.J. Holiday; Billy Sullivan
- Production companies: Neo Art & Logic
- Distributed by: Paramount Pictures
- Release date: April 20, 2004 (Newport Beach International Film Festival)
- Running time: 93 minutes
- Countries: United States, Serbia and Montenegro.
- Language: English

Trekkies 2 is a 2004 American documentary film directed by Roger Nygard, and the sequel to the 1997 film Trekkies. The film travels throughout the world, mainly Europe, to show fans of Star Trek, commonly known as Trekkies. It also profiles people from the first film, including Barbara Adams and Gabriel Köerner. Also featured are Star Trek-themed punk bands from Sacramento, California, including Warp 11 and the "No Kill I" franchise.

== Production ==
One of the European filming shots were done in Novi Sad, Serbia and Montenegro (modern day Serbia).

== Reception ==
MaryAnn Johanson of "Flick Filosopher" wrote "this time out the focus is on the real people behind the Spock ears, and the film recognizes that they’re a lot more clever, creative, self-aware, and generous than the uninitiated will have realized."

Nick Schager of "Lessons of Darkness" gave it D+ grade. He called it "a repetitive hodgepodge" and "More sloppily constructed than the first film".
