= Get a life (idiom) =

Taunt to people focused on pointless or trivial matters

Get a life is an idiom and catch phrase that has gained international usage. It is intended as a taunt, towards a person whose behaviour is considered pathetic in some way, with the implication that they ought to have more constructive things to do. Sometimes the phrase is used to describe people who are viewed as officious or meddling in the affairs of others, and so it can be interchangeable with the rejoinder "mind your own business".

The phrase has also appeared as a generally more emphatic variant of the taunt "get a job" and implies the addressee needs to go out and make their way in the world, without being supported by outside sources such as parents or benefactors.

== Documented early use ==
- 1983: The first Oxford English Dictionary citation is from a January 1983 Washington Post article: "Gross me out, I mean, Valley Girl was, like, ohmigod, it was last year, fer sure! I mean, get a life! Say what?"
- 1986: Appears in Baby Anger page 48 as "Get a life, people of New Jersey!"
- 1986: The phrase was used by actor William Shatner in his appearance in a December episode of Saturday Night Live, in which he shows up at a Star Trek convention and implores a group of Trekkies who are too obsessed with the details of Shatner's life to move out of their parents' basements and "get a life."
