= Vladimir Horunzhy =

American film producer

- Володимир Хорунжий
- Born: September 19, 1949 (age 76); Kiev, Ukrainian SSR, Soviet Union (now Kyiv, Ukraine)
- Occupations: Film producer, composer
- Years active: 1969–present

Vladimir Anatoliiovych Horunzhy (Note: Ukrainian: Володимир Анатолійович Хорунжий, romanized: Volodymyr Anatoliiovych Khorunzhyi) (born September 19, 1949) is a film producer, composer, and jazz musician.

Horunzhy graduated from a Special music school at Kyiv Music Conservatory. His first composition was written at the age of 12. In the '70s, Horunzhy led the Pop-Symphony Orchestra of Radio and Television of Ukraine. From 1977 to 1981 he lived and worked in Hungary.

An active jazz musician, Horunzhy performed at Soviet jazz festivals in Tallinn, Moscow, Donetsk, and throughout the Soviet Union. At age 26 he became principal conductor and staff composer for the Ukrainian National TV and Radio Orchestra, Kyiv. Living in Budapest, Horunzhy composed and conducted for the Hungarian State Orchestra. Entering the realm of film scoring, he scored feature films and animation. He also performed with jazz-rock groups throughout the European community.

In 1981, Horunzhy moved to the United States. The first project which he participated in as a composer there, was the daytime soap opera “Santa Barbara”. In New York, he worked with George Benson, Michael Brecker, Marcus Miller, and Michał Urbaniak. He frequented jazz club "Seventh Avenue South" with his groups "212" and "Central Committee" which included Omar Hakim, Victor Bailey, Bob Malach, Jeff Andrews, Don Mulvaney, and Mitch Coodley. Horunzhy also orchestrated for and studied with Jerry Goldsmith.

Starting in 1991 Vladimir Horunzhy produced his first feature comedy, "High Strung," starring Jim Carrey, Steve Oedekerk, Fred Willard, and Kirsten Dunst (her first part in the movies). There are more than 60 features, TV, and animation films produced and/or scored by Vladimir Horunzhy. Since 2006 along with a US-based production company, he has been producing Ukrainian film projects. In 2009 he founded the production company/studio InQ located in Kyiv, Ukraine.

== Filmography ==
=== Producer ===
- 2013 - Synevir 3D Gran Prix at Moscow International 3D Film Festival
- 2012 - Lovers in Kyiv winner of more than 20 International Film Festivals
- 2010 – My Widow’s Husband
- 2009 - 13 months
- 2007 - Orangelove
- 1999 – Mike, Lu & Og
- 1999 – Flying Nansen
- 1999 – Turnaround
- 1996 – Lord Protector/ Dark Mist
- 1996 – Original Gangstas
- 1995 - Sacred Cargo
- 1991 – High Strung

=== Composer ===
- 2002 - Bookashki winner of more than 40 Grand Prizes at International Film Festivals
- 1999 – Children of the Corn 666
- 1999 – Mike, Lu & Og
- 1999 - Flying Nansen
- 1999 - Turnaround
- 1996 – Lord Protector/ Dark Mist
- 1996 - Original Gangstas
- 1995 – Sacred Cargo
- 1995 – Blood of the innocent
- 1995 – The Langoliers
- 1993 - Point of Impact
- 1992 - Miracle in the Wilderness
- 1992 - Blink of an Eye
- 1991 - High Strung
- 1991 - Firehead
- 1990 – Stranger Within
- 1990 - The Forbidden Dance
- 1990 - Zorro
- 1989 – Elves
- 1989 - Homer and Eddie
- 1989 - Oro fino
- 1989 - Tales from the Crypt
- 1989 - Man of passion / Pasión de hombre
- 1988 - Return of the Living Dead Part II
- 1989 - Creepy Tales
- 1975 - Four inseparable cockroaches and the cricket
