= Roddenberry =

Roddenberry is a surname. Notable people with the surname include:

- Gene Roddenberry (1921–1991), American scriptwriter and producer, also creator of the Star Trek franchise
  - 4659 Roddenberry, an asteroid
  - Roddenberry (crater), crater on Mars
- Majel Barrett-Roddenberry (1932–2008), American actress, wife of Gene Roddenberry
- Rod Roddenberry (born 1974), son of Gene Roddenberry and Majel Barrett-Roddenberry
- Seaborn Roddenbery (1870–1913), U.S. representative from Georgia
