= High Strung (1992 film) =

1992 film by Roger Nygard

- Theatrical release poster
- Directed by: Roger Nygard
- Written by: Steve Oedekerk; Robert Kuhn
- Produced by: Rubin M. Mendoza; Roger Nygard
- Starring: Steve Oedekerk; Thomas F. Wilson; Denise Crosby; Fred Willard; Jim Carrey; Jani Lane
- Cinematography: Alan Oltman
- Edited by: Tom Siiter
- Music by: Vladimir Horunzhy
- Production company: Film Brigade
- Distributed by: Rocket Pictures
- Release dates: January 8, 1992 (Palm Springs International Film Festival); April 26, 1992 (USA Film Festival)
- Running time: 93 minutes
- Country: United States
- Language: English
- Budget: $400,000

High Strung is a 1992 American independent comedy film directed by Roger Nygard. It stars Steve Oedekerk (who also wrote the script with Robert Kuhn) as Thane Furrows, an uptight children's author who rarely leaves his house, eats only cereal, and is irritated by everything around him. It also stars Thomas F. Wilson, Fred Willard, Denise Crosby, Jani Lane, and Jim Carrey, and also contains a short cameo appearance by a young Kirsten Dunst.

Despite the lack of a release on DVD, High Strung has developed and maintained a strong cult fan base.

== Plot ==
The film centers on Thane Furrows, who spends the day in his apartment in an unknown location in Texas, complaining about various subjects. These include flies, popsicles, junk mail, his boss's wife, his upstairs neighbor, smoking, and salesmen. He also philosophizes on topics such as the morality of eating humans and the sensibility of keeping pets.

Furrows holds a number of unusual philosophies. He desires his children's books to be instructive for the good of society, examples being How to Start the Family Car (in case "someone chokes on a chicken bone" and "there are no adults around") and Bye Bye Grandma, which he intends to help children accustom themselves to death. He refuses to keep pets, believing they would "turn on you" in a food shortage, and instead keeps a cardboard cutout of a dog named Pete.

Several minor annoyances perturb him throughout the day: a fly lands on his cereal at breakfast, which he inadvertently eats; an insurance salesman named Ray comes to the door, to which Furrows responds by feigning interest and, shortly after promising to take out several policies, slamming the door in Ray's face with the words "I'd rather be dead"; an automated survey about carpet cleaning calls him repeatedly; his boss's wife comes by to pick up a book he was writing, and he eventually tells her off. Following the fly incident, Furrows experiences a series of scares. When closing his eyes, he repeatedly sees a menacing face. He receives numerous messages, both by phone and mail, about "eight o'clock."

Furrows's only friend appears to be a man named Al, who visits in the afternoon. They eat cereal, and Al attempts to dissuade Thane from his cynicism. While Thane attacks the optimism of people like Al, he seems comforted by Al's sympathy over the visit of Melanie, the boss's wife. Later that night, Furrows loses an arm-wrestling match to his noisy upstairs neighbor, granting the neighbor the right to play metal music as loud as he wants, whenever he wants. Thane responds by cutting the neighbor's power to maintain peace. After a day of "messing around," Furrows receives a knock at the door at the dreaded "eight o'clock" and is greeted by a limo driver. When he enters the limo, the driver (Jim Carrey) reveals himself to be Death.

Death tells Furrows that he has met his quota of saying "I wish I were dead" and must die. Furrows complains about the absurdity of the rule until Death, unable to scare Furrows into compliance, returns him to his body. Furrows awakens with a frightened Al standing over him, trying to rouse him. The story concludes with the two going out to a restaurant, although Furrows insists on being served cereal, demonstrating a willingness to try some new things, but not all.

After the credits, a short epilogue depicts Death stopping the limo in a dark space and looking at the heavens. He claims that he simply couldn't tolerate Thane and had to return him to life. He adds that he is never coming back for Thane, implying that Thane may have accidentally become immortal.

== Cast ==
- Steve Oedekerk as Thane Furrows, a cynical children's book author and the main protagonist of the film.
- Thomas F. Wilson as Al Dalby, Thane's idealistic friend who is constantly annoyed by Thane's cynicism.
- Denise Crosby as Melanie, the demanding and mean-spirited wife of Thane's employer Marvin.
  - Crosby also played Thane’s imagined wife in his fantasy near the end of the film.
- Fred Willard as Ray, a jolly insurance salesman who visits Thane at the beginning of the film.
- Jani Lane as Vol, Thane's obnoxious neighbor who listens to rock-and-roll relentlessly.
- Ed Williams as Marvin, Thane's good-natured boss and Melanie's husband.
- Ivy Austin as Contestant on a Game Show
- Kirsten Dunst as Young Girl who is Thane’s daughter in his fantasy at the end of the film.
- Toni Sawyer as Mrs. Furrows, Thane's mother
- Mark Eugene Roberts as Limo Driver, a subordinate of Death’s.
- Jim Carrey as Death, the somewhat comedic Grim Reaper who plans to obtain Thane's soul and the main antagonist.

== Production ==
High Strung was funded by former orchestra conductor Vladimir Horunzhy and rock guitarist Sergei Zholobetsky, both whom had fled to the United States from Russia in 1979 after they refused to join the Communist Party. Horunzhy persuaded Zholobetsky to invest his entire life savings to produce the film. High Strung was made on a budget of $400,000.

Jim Carrey agreed to a small role in the film due to his friendship with Steve Oedekerk. His cameo is uncredited per the terms of contract, which reportedly forbids using Carrey's name in the film’s title, closing credits or the credit block on advertising posters. Carrey's management team asked the film producers to not use his name or likeness in association with the promotion of the film. Regardless, Carrey was featured prominently in the film's marketing.

== Release ==
High Strung was screened at several film festivals including the San Jose Film Festival, the Palm Springs Film Festival, the 16th Cleveland International Film Festival, the 22nd USA Festival, Houston International Film Festival, the Rivertown Film Festival/Minneapolis, New Hampshire Film Festival, the Florida Film Festival, and the Philadelphia Film Festival, and the Berkshire Film Festival. Despite positive reviews and winning awards, the producers failed to secure theatrical or home-video distribution. According to Roger Nygard, "I learned the film industry is like selling shoes-they all want brand names, and we didn’t have a brand name. Steve Oedekerk is quite well known as a stand-up comic, but that didn't matter to exhibitors. They wanted film names."

The success of Ace Ventura: Pet Detective (1994) launched Carrey's film career and renewed interest in High Strung among several independent distributors. The film producers sold the distribution rights to Rocket Pictures which released the film on VHS in 1994.
