= The Neutral Zone (Star Trek: The Next Generation) =

- Star Trek: The Next Generation episode
- This episode marked the first appearance of the Romulans in Star Trek: The Next Generation
- Episode no.: Season 1 Episode 26
- Directed by: James L. Conway
- Story by: Deborah McIntyre; Mona Clee
- Teleplay by: Maurice Hurley
- Cinematography by: Edward R. Brown
- Production code: 126
- Original air date: May 16, 1988

Guest appearances
- Marc Alaimo – Tebok; Anthony James – Thei; Leon Rippy – L.Q. "Sonny" Clemonds; Gracie Harrison – Clare Raymond; Peter Mark Richman – Ralph Offenhouse

Episode chronology
← Previous "Conspiracy"	Next → "The Child"
- Star Trek: The Next Generation season 1

"The Neutral Zone" is the season finale of the first season of the American science fiction television series Star Trek: The Next Generation, originally aired within the United States on May 16, 1988, in broadcast syndication. The episode originated as a story submission purchased by Paramount written by Deborah McIntyre and Mona Clee, and was turned into a teleplay by Maurice Hurley. Because of the 1988 Writers Guild of America strike, Hurley created the script in a day and a half, and the timescale forced the abandonment of both the idea of a two-part episode and of the first appearance of the Borg, which was delayed until the following season episode "Q Who".

Set in the 24th century, the series follows the adventures of the Starfleet crew of the Federation starship Enterprise-D. In "The Neutral Zone", the Enterprise is sent to investigate the destruction of Federation outposts near space controlled by the Romulan Star Empire, discovering a derelict Earth satellite with cryonically frozen humans aboard.

This episode introduced the redesigned Romulans, with prosthetic forehead pieces designed by makeup supervisor Michael Westmore, and the first appearance of the Romulan Warbird, which was designer Andrew Probert's final work for the Star Trek franchise. The episode was mildly received by critics who viewed it after the end of the season, who criticized the two-plot nature of the episode and the general lack of excitement.

== Plot ==
While Captain Picard (Patrick Stewart) is away at an emergency Federation conference, the Enterprise crew discovers an ancient space capsule from Earth. Inside they find three humans in cryonic chambers. Lt. Cdr. Data (Brent Spiner) asks to move the chambers to the Enterprise and Commander Riker (Jonathan Frakes) agrees. Picard returns and orders the Enterprise to the Neutral Zone, as several Federation outposts near the edges of the zone have not responded to communications. He explains that the conference was about the potential threat of the Romulans, who have not been seen for decades. As Data and Chief Medical Officer Dr. Crusher (Gates McFadden) work to thaw the cryonically preserved humans, Picard admonishes Data for bringing them aboard during a crucial time, and puts Riker in charge of looking after them.

The survivors—Claire Raymond (Gracie Harrison), a housewife; Ralph Offenhouse (Peter Mark Richman), a financier; and L. Q. "Sonny" Clemmons (Leon Rippy), a musician—are from the late 20th century. All died of incurable illnesses at the time and were placed in cryonic suspension after their deaths in the hope that cures might be found in the future. Dr. Crusher, in reviving them, easily cures them of their illnesses. They have to cope with the culture shock of awakening in a distant future with the realization that everything they knew and had are now gone.

Of the three, the financier Ralph Offenhouse is the most vocal regarding his dissatisfaction with the 24th century's lack of amenities. He unfavorably compares the Enterprise to the Queen Elizabeth 2, remarking that even on a 20th-century ocean liner, he could "get a drink and a newspaper" and receive better service than what Picard's crew provides.

L. Q. "Sonny" Clemmons also contributes several pop culture references, primarily focused on his desire for entertainment. He repeatedly asks to watch "the boob tube" (television), leading to a historical explanation from Data that the medium went out of style in the mid-21st century. Additionally, Clemmons inquires about the fate of the Atlanta Braves, expressing a desire to see a "box score" and learn how the team is performing in the future.

== Production ==
=== Writing and casting ===
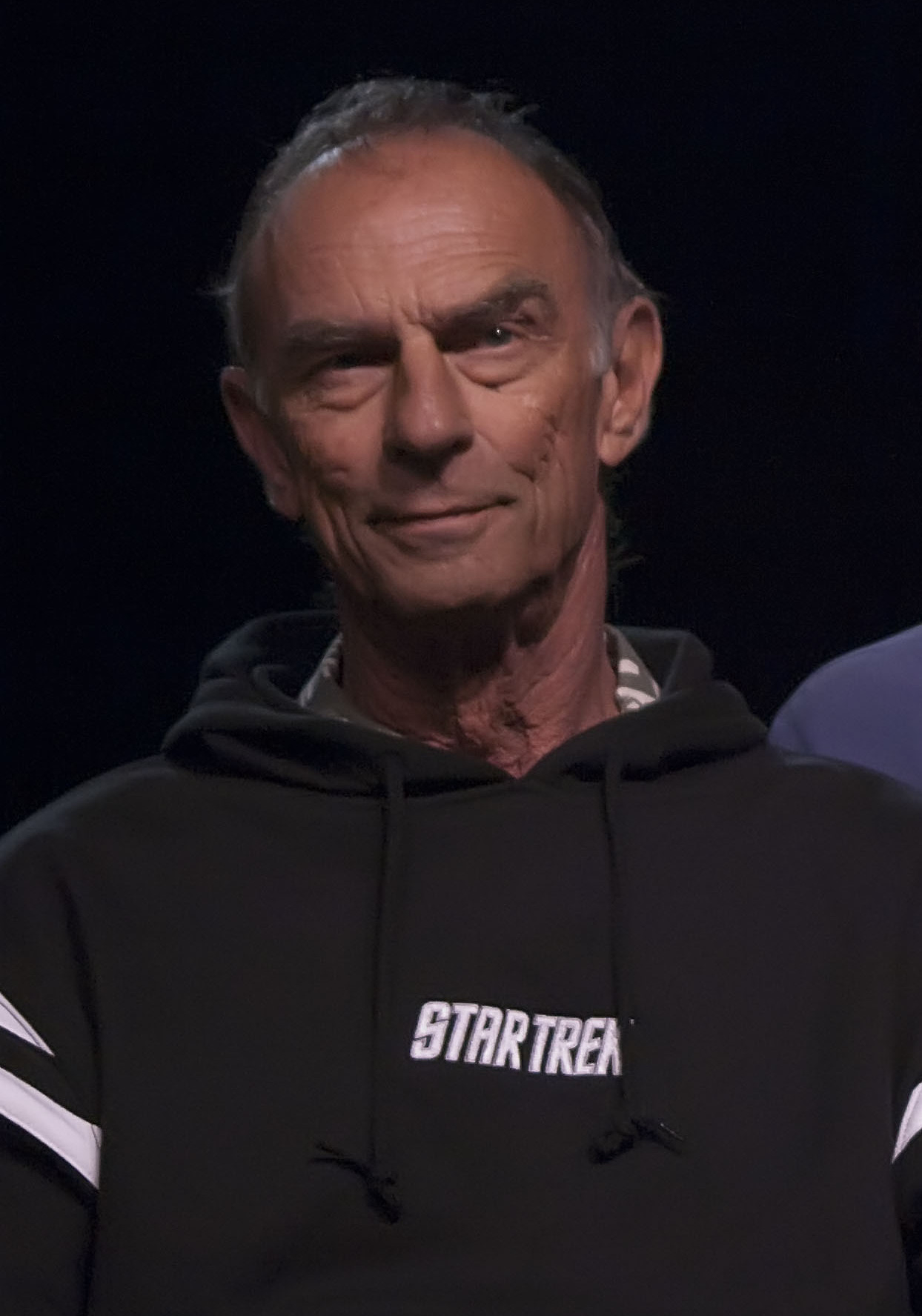
Marc Alaimo made his second appearance in The Next Generation in "The Neutral Zone".

Due to the impending Writers Guild of America strike, writer and co-executive producer Maurice Hurley developed the teleplay in a day and a half from a story submission purchased by Paramount written by Deborah McIntyre and Mona Clee. Due to the strike, certain story ideas were removed from the plot including the planned first appearance of the Borg, which was delayed until the second-season episode "Q Who". "The Neutral Zone" was originally intended to be the first of a two-part episode but due to the strike there wasn't enough time to write the second part and so the story was shortened. The second episode would have had the Enterprise and the Romulans unite against the Borg. The script that was shot was a first draft and due to the writer's strike, no amendments were made. Director James L. Conway later explained: "If there hadn't been a strike, I think it would have been a better script." It was the second episode of The Next Generation directed by Conway, the first being "Justice". He did not direct another episode until "Frame of Mind" during season six.

In the writers and directors' guide for the series, written by the show's creator Gene Roddenberry prior to the first season, Romulans were covered by one of the main writing rules that stated: "No stories about warfare with Klingons and Romulans and no stories with Vulcans. We are determined not to copy ourselves and believe there must be other interesting aliens in a galaxy filled with billions of stars and planets." Following the perceived failure of the Ferengi as the main villains of TNG by the production staff, the Romulans became the main villains during the early years of the series. This was in addition to the Borg, who were originally developed as an insectoid race for this episode but became a race of cyborgs by the time they first appeared in "Q Who". While the Romulans made their first TNG appearance in this episode, they had been mentioned in "Angel One" and "Heart of Glory". The episode was the final one of season one to be completed, with production wrapping ten months after it began on "Encounter at Farpoint".

The episode featured an appearance by Gene Roddenberry's production assistant Susan Sackett as a Starfleet science officer. Her appearance was the result of winning a bet over her weight loss. She would go on to write two episodes of The Next Generation with Fred Bronson, "Ménage à Troi" and "The Game". Peter Mark Richman appeared as Ralph Offenhouse who had appeared in a guest star capacity in over 500 roles on television. Leon Rippy appeared as L.Q. "Sonny" Clemonds, having previously appeared alongside Jonathan Frakes in North and South. Marc Alaimo made his second Star Trek appearance in this episode, having appeared in "Lonely Among Us" as the Antican leader, and would go on to appear in season four's "The Wounded" as Cardassian Gul Macet, as well as appearing in season five's finale "Time's Arrow" as card shark Frederick LaRouque, before being cast once more as a Cardassian in the recurring role of Gul Dukat on Star Trek: Deep Space Nine.

Two of the time-displaced humans returned in Star Trek literature, with Ralph Offenhouse appearing in The Next Generation novel Debtor's Planet as the Federation Ambassador to the Ferengi and again in the Star Trek: Destiny trilogy as the Secretary of Commerce for the Federation. Clare Raymond made a further appearance in the Star Trek: Department of Temporal Investigations novel Watching the Clock as a counsellor for time-displaced people. Offenhouse, Raymond, and "Sonny" Clemmons also appeared in the two-part Star Trek: The Eugenic Wars by Greg Cox, which was set prior to their appearance in this episode.

=== Make-up and design ===
Michael Westmore developed a new appearance for the Romulans in this episode, necessarily taking into account the concepts introduced for them in the original series episodes "Balance of Terror" and "The Enterprise Incident". There was also a desire to ensure that they appeared different from the Vulcans, with the default appearance of the Romulans being more aggressive and warlike. Westmore developed prosthetic forehead pieces, taking careful steps to ensure that they didn't look like Neanderthals. Rather than individual designs for each forehead as with the Klingons, a number of standard designs were created.

The Romulan Warbird made its first appearance in this episode. It was the final design by Andrew Probert for the Star Trek franchise. He had previously designed both the Enterprise in Star Trek: The Motion Picture and the Enterprise-D for The Next Generation. The double-hulled nature of the starship originated in early designs, but the wings were originally vertical rather than horizontal. The ship was deliberately made to be larger than the Enterprise.

== Reception ==
"The Neutral Zone" aired in broadcast syndication during the week of May 20, 1988. It received Nielsen ratings of 10.2. This was the highest ratings received by the series since "Symbiosis" four episodes earlier.

Several reviewers re-watched Star Trek: The Next Generation after the end of the series. Keith DeCandido on Tor.com felt that the episode did not really work, saying that the "smug moralizing with regard to the three 20th-century refugees is laid on a bit too thick", and that the appearance of the Romulans tried too hard to be reminiscent of their first appearance in "Balance of Terror". Overall he said that the "first season ends, not with a bang, but with a whimper". Zack Handlen of The A.V. Club felt that the previous episode, "Conspiracy", would have served better as an end to the first season as "The Neutral Zone" wasn't the worst so far, "but it may possibly be the most frustrating, because it has two storylines". He felt that the Romulan plot would have been sufficient alone and described the storyline featuring the cryonic survivors as "extremely painful comic relief". He gave the episode a grade of C−.

The Romulan Warbird (the "D'deridex class"), which made periodic appearances in the Star Trek franchise after this episode, was rated by Space.com as the 9th-best Star Trek spacecraft. In particular they note its debut, uncloaking before the Enterprise 1701-D after the Romulans’ half-century of isolation. The spacecraft's fictional power and elusiveness is noted in regards to the Star Trek science fiction universe.

The New Yorker, in a 2016 article for the 50th anniversary of Star Trek, noted "The Neutral Zone" as one of the defining moments of the new series. They note how when they uncover a frozen Wall Street broker, he is shocked to find a future where there is more to life than accumulating wealth. In 2017, Den of Geek ranked "The Neutral Zone" as one of top 25 "must watch" episodes of Star Trek: The Next Generation.

== Media releases ==
The first home media release of "The Neutral Zone" was on VHS cassette on May 26, 1993, in the United States and Canada. The episode was later included on the Star Trek: The Next Generation season one DVD boxed set, released in March 2002, and was released as part of the season one Blu-ray set on July 24, 2012.
