= Hannah Louise Shearer =

American television writer

- Born: August 25, 1945 (age 79)
- Occupation(s): Television writer and producer

Hannah Louise Shearer (born August 25, 1945), also known as Hannah Shearer or Hannah L. Shearer, is a writer who was credited with writing five episodes whilst on the staff of Star Trek: The Next Generation and an episode of Star Trek: Deep Space Nine. She was also a writer and producer for Emergency! and Knight Rider.

== Career ==
One of her first roles in television was as a production assistant on NBC's Sierra in 1974. She went on to become a writer and producer for Emergency!, which had crossed over with Sierra. She was also the writer for the pilot episode of Quail Lake which was intended to replace Emergency! but never went past a pilot entitled "Pine Canyon is Burning". Shearer was a producer for Knight Rider during the first season in 1982. She left mid-season and was replaced with Joel Rogosin. She also wrote the first-season episode "Not a Drop to Drink", and during the filming she became friends with guest actress Sondra Currie. Shearer later wrote Nashville Beat, for The Nashville Network in 1989. She came up with the idea for the story alongside actor Kent McCord, and developed it into the final script.

=== Star Trek ===
The first episode that Shearer wrote for The Next Generation was "When the Bough Breaks", which she later said was her favourite episode on the series. She pitched the idea to associate producer D.C. Fontana on the basis of using the families aboard the ship that had not been mentioned since the pilot episode of the series. She subsequently conducted an uncredited re-write on the teleplay for the episode "Coming of Age". She also re-wrote the teleplay for "Skin of Evil", which features the death of main cast character Tasha Yar and was originally written by Joseph Stefano. However, she was given a writing credit for this. She was subsequently thanked in the foreword of Jean Lorrah's The Next Generation novel Survivors alongside Gene Roddenberry and Stefano, as the book was inspired by "Skin of Evil".

Because of the impending 1988 Writers Guild of America strike, her work on "We'll Always Have Paris" with Deborah Dean Davis was completed in five days. She was not happy with the subsequent edits made to the script that the pair originally turned in, saying that "we were writing the most romantic episode in the world" but that "it was toned down 75%". She left the writing staff for the series between season one and season two because she did not get along with fellow staffer Maurice Hurley. She later came up with the story idea for "Pen Pals" which was developed into a script by Melinda M. Snodgrass. Her final script for TNG was "The Price". Her final Star Trek writing credit was on the Star Trek: Deep Space Nine episode "Q-Less", which was the only episode of that series to feature the character of Q.
