= The Arsenal of Freedom =

- Star Trek: The Next Generation episode
- Episode no.: Season 1 Episode 21
- Directed by: Les Landau
- Story by: Maurice Hurley; Robert Lewin
- Teleplay by: Richard Manning; Hans Beimler
- Cinematography by: Edward R. Brown
- Production code: 121
- Original air date: April 11, 1988

Guest appearances
- Vincent Schiavelli – The Peddler; Marco Rodríguez – Captain Paul Rice; Vyto Ruginis – Chief Engineer Logan; Julia Nickson – Ensign Lian T'Su; George De La Peña – Lt. Solis

Episode chronology
| ← Previous "Heart of Glory" | Next → "Symbiosis" |
- Star Trek: The Next Generation season 1

"The Arsenal of Freedom" is the twenty-first episode of the American science fiction television series Star Trek: The Next Generation, originally aired on April 11, 1988, in broadcast syndication. The teleplay was written by Richard Manning and Hans Beimler, based on a story by Beimler. The episode was directed by Les Landau.

Set in the 24th century, the series follows the adventures of the Starfleet crew of the Federation starship Enterprise-D. In this episode, the crew investigates the disappearance of the USS Drake. They travel to the planet Minos, where an away team and the ship are separately attacked by the demonstration of an automated weapons system.

Maurice Hurley saw the episode as commentary on the sale of F-14 Tomcats to Iran. He intended to have Doctor Beverly Crusher (Gates McFadden) reveal her feelings for Captain Jean-Luc Picard (Patrick Stewart) in this episode, but Gene Roddenberry had it changed. The opinions of critics were mixed, but singled out the performance of Vincent Schiavelli for praise.

== Plot ==
The Enterprise has been sent to the Lorenze Cluster to search for the USS Drake after it vanished while surveying the planet Minos, which many years ago became wealthy by selling weapons. When the ship reaches the planet, they are met by a recorded holographic figure (Vincent Schiavelli) advertising "The Arsenal of Freedom", which invites the crew to the surface. Commander William Riker (Jonathan Frakes), Lt. Commander Data (Brent Spiner) and Lieutenant Tasha Yar (Denise Crosby) beam down to the surface to investigate. Riker is met by Captain Rice of the Drake, however Rice acts strangely by interrogating Riker on his ship's armament. A suspicious Riker decides to test Rice by claiming that the name of his ship is the "Lollipop", which he refers to as "a good ship" in reference to a Shirley Temple song. After Rice asks him about the weapon systems on the Lollipop Riker is able to deduce that the captain is an imposter. Riker continues to feed him false information, after which the "captain" disappears, revealing a floating sentry probe which fires a stasis field around Riker before Data and Yar can destroy it.

The Enterprise cannot beam Riker through the stasis field, so Captain Jean-Luc Picard (Patrick Stewart) and Doctor Beverly Crusher (Gates McFadden) travel to the surface, and Lt. Geordi La Forge (LeVar Burton) is left in command of the Enterprise. As Picard and Crusher attempt to free Riker, another sentry probe appears and fires on them. Picard and Crusher are separated from Data and Yar in the skirmish and fall into a pit, severely injuring Crusher. Meanwhile, Data and Yar discover that the second probe is more powerful than the first and requires their combined power to destroy it. While Picard tends to Crusher's injuries, Data manages to release Riker from the stasis field. Riker, Yar and Data are again attacked, with this new probe requiring even more phaser power to destroy it. Data deduces that each probe learns from the previous probes' experiences and adapts to become stronger, and that the next probe might be unbeatable.

The Enterprise is fired upon by a cloaked attacker, with each subsequent attack stronger than the last, straining the ship's shields. Chief Engineer Lt. Logan (Vyto Ruginis) goes to the bridge to demand that the Enterprise flee the planet and attempts to take command, as he outranks La Forge, but La Forge refuses, pointing out that Logan lacks the authority to remove him and orders him to return to Engineering. As the attacks continue, La Forge recalls Logan to the bridge and orders a saucer separation, leaving Logan in charge of the saucer and taking command of the star-drive section from the battle bridge to return to Minos.

Still underground, Picard discovers a computer terminal, which he activates, causing a hologram of the salesman to appear and explain that they are witnessing a demonstration of an intelligent weapon system which is able to upgrade itself in response to any enemy threat. Picard surmises that the Minosians and the Drake were destroyed by the weapons. He fails to coerce the hologram into ending the demonstration. Data is able to locate Picard and determines that while the sentries could be set to destroy their own power source, the resulting explosion would probably take out the whole area, including the away team. Picard finally tells the salesman he will buy the system, causing the salesman to disappear and the probes on the planet to shut down. La Forge uses the planet's atmosphere to reveal the location of the space-borne probe and destroys it. The away team returns to the star-drive section, where Picard allows La Forge to stay in command until they rendezvous with the saucer section, remarking that he left him with the ship intact and would like it returned in the same condition.

== Production ==
Story editor Maurice Hurley saw the plot of "The Arsenal of Freedom" as commentary on the sale of American Grumman F-14 Tomcats to Iran taken to the "ultimate conclusion". In 1974, Shah Mohammad Reza Pahlavi purchased 80 Tomcats and missiles for $2 billion. That transaction prevented Grumman from going into bankruptcy as the United States Congress was no longer funding the project. Iran was the only country other than the United States to use the planes.

The original story had Picard injured, and Crusher revealing her feelings for him while trying to save him from dying. Gene Roddenberry did not want to do a love story and so it was changed. Les Landau made the suggestion to switch around the roles of Picard and Crusher to take them out of their elements. Landau had been an assistant director on staff, and became the first member of the production team to direct an episode with "The Arsenal of Freedom".

The model of the drone was created by Dan Curry, from a L'eggs pantyhose container and a shampoo bottle. He hand animated the model instead of using motion control photography, using his years of Tai Chi training to keep the movements fluid. To blend into the background, he wore a pair of green tights whilst he was manually moving the model on screen.

== Reception ==
"The Arsenal of Freedom" first aired in broadcast syndication on April 11, 1988. It received a 10.4 rating, meaning that it was seen by 10.4 percent of all households. This was the first new episode in three weeks, the previous episode, "Heart of Glory" receiving a rating of 10.7.

Several reviewers re-watched the episode after the end of the series. Keith DeCandido reviewed the episode for Tor.com in July 2011. He highlighted the appearance of Vincent Schiavelli, saying that he "totally owns every scene he's in". He thought that the situation which left La Forge in charge of the Enterprise was "horribly contrived" and said "Picard doesn't even give a good excuse for going down to the planet beyond the script calling for it". He gave the episode a score of six out of ten, summing up that it was a "fun, enjoyable, diverting episode". Zack Handlen reviewed the episode in May 2010 for The A.V. Club. He criticised the episode, saying that there "are all kinds of problems, the biggest being that the episode doesn't really have a third act, but the moral superiority of the crew is on full display, and it's frustrating." He summed up the moral story played out in this episode, saying that "On TOS, Kirk, Spock, and McCoy would've hashed out the appeal of an unbeatable weapon as well as its drawbacks. Here, we're all supposed to know that violence begets violence, and that's it." He gave the episode a grade of C+.

James Hunt watched the episode for the website Den of Geek in March 2013. He recalled it being a good episode but found it wasn't as good on the re-watch for the review. He thought that the plot seemed reminiscent of the plot of a Philip K. Dick novel but thought that the away team sequences on the planet were a little boring with the exception of Data jumping down into the pit where Picard and Crusher were. Michelle Erica Green reviewed the episode for the website TrekNation in August 2007. She thought that the scenario with La Forge was the most forced but described Vincent Schiavelli as a "treat". She said that the cast otherwise didn't get to stretch much but was pleased with the visuals where the star-drive section enters the planet's atmosphere.

== Releases ==
"The Arsenal of Freedom" was released on DVD on region one as part of the Season one set on March 26, 2002 with the sound remastered to Dolby Digital 5.1 Surround standards, and a series of interviews with the cast and crew were included on the sixth disc. It was remastered in High-definition video and released as part of the season one Blu-ray set on July 24, 2012.
