= Coming of Age (Star Trek: The Next Generation) =

- Star Trek: The Next Generation episode
- Episode no.: Season 1 Episode 19
- Directed by: Mike Vejar
- Written by: Sandy Fries
- Cinematography by: Edward R. Brown
- Production code: 119
- Original air date: March 14, 1988

Guest appearances
- Ward Costello – Adm. Gregory Quinn; Robert Schenkkan – Lt. Cdr. Dexter Remmick; John Putch – Mordock; Robert Ito – Lt. Chang; Stephen Gregory – Jake Kurland; Tasia Valenza – T'Shanik; Estee Chandler – Oliana Mirren; Brendan McKane – Technician No. 1; Wyatt Knight – Technician No. 2; Daniel Riordan – Rondon

Episode chronology
← Previous "Home Soil"	Next → "Heart of Glory"
- Star Trek: The Next Generation season 1

"Coming of Age" is the nineteenth episode of the American science fiction television series Star Trek: The Next Generation. It first aired in broadcast syndication on March 14, 1988. Sandy Fries originally wrote the episode, but Hannah Louise Shearer performed an uncredited re-write. It is the only episode of the series directed by Mike Vejar, who went on to direct episodes of Deep Space Nine, Voyager and Enterprise.

Set in the 24th century, the series follows the adventures of the Starfleet crew of the Federation starship Enterprise-D. In the episode, Wesley Crusher (Wil Wheaton) takes a Starfleet Academy entrance exam while Adm. Gregory Quinn (Ward Costello) and Lt. Cdr. Dexter Remmick (Robert Schenkkan) investigate the senior staff of the Enterprise.

The episode marked the first appearance of a shuttlecraft in the series and the first speaking role for a Vulcan. The events of the episode continued in "Conspiracy" and "Samaritan Snare". 10.1 million viewers watched the episode during the first broadcast, with mixed responses from critics.

== Plot ==
Captain Jean-Luc Picard (Patrick Stewart) greets his friend Admiral Gregory Quinn (Ward Costello) and his assistant Lt. Commander Dexter Remmick (Robert Schenkkan) aboard the Enterprise. For classified reasons, Quinn has ordered Remmick to perform an investigation of the Enterprise and its crew and expects Picard to fully co-operate. Remmick's inquiry causes tension in the crew, particularly when he questions the trustworthiness of the senior staff based on their personal logs and past actions. A young cadet, having failed the Starfleet Academy entrance examination, attempts to run away in a shuttlecraft but unbalances the engine, placing him in danger of burning up in the atmosphere. Picard is able to direct the cadet to pilot the shuttle away from a nearby planet by bouncing off the atmosphere.

The investigation is completed, and Remmick informs both Picard and Quinn that there is no sign of wrongdoing, and expresses his interest in joining its crew in the future. Quinn tells Picard that he feels there is an unknown force that has infiltrated Starfleet, and he was seeking to assure himself of his trust in Picard and the Enterprise crew. To help combat this threat, Quinn offers Picard a promotion to Admiral and a job overseeing Starfleet Academy which would place Picard near Quinn at all times. Picard mulls the offer for some time, but eventually declines.

Meanwhile, Wesley Crusher (Wil Wheaton) prepares to take the Academy entrance exam himself. He succeeds in passing several parts of the exam, and helps Mordock (John Putch), a highly talented Benzite and fellow competitor, to solve a difficult test problem so that they may both advance. Wesley is worried about the psychological part of the exam, and he is directed to a room to wait for the test to start.

While waiting, he hears an explosion nearby, and leaves the room to investigate. He finds two men trapped by fallen components in a fire-engulfed room. Wesley helps to release one man wounded under a heavy pipe, and tries to coax the other man to leave the burning room, but the man is frozen with fear. Wesley is forced to abandon him and drags the other man to safety. Outside the room, he discovers the explosion was fake and this was the psychological test: to see whether he could make a difficult decision in circumstances reminiscent of those that killed his father. (Rescuing either man would pass the test.)

Eventually, the cadets are told of the results, and Mordock is granted admission into Starfleet Academy, while Wesley is encouraged to try again next year. Mordock thanks Wesley for his help and wishes him future success. After Wesley returns to the Enterprise, Picard confides in him that he also failed the examination the first time.

== Production ==
Although Mike Vejar directed only this single episode of The Next Generation; he later directed several episodes of Deep Space Nine, Voyager and Enterprise. Hannah Louise Shearer conducted an uncredited script re-write and left the details of the conspiracy deliberately open as plans were already underway for a follow-up story. "Coming of Age" featured several firsts for The Next Generation, including the first appearance of a shuttlecraft in the series and the first appearance of a Vulcan (Note: Gene Roddenberry, the creator of Star Trek, wrote in the series bible that there should be "no stories with Vulcans", stating that "there must be other interesting aliens in a galaxy filled with billions of stars and planets".) in a speaking role within the series.

Only a quarter of the shuttlecraft set was built for "Coming of Age" with the set expanded gradually according to the scene requirements in season two. Due to construction errors with the full-scale model, it failed to match the miniature. A smaller shuttlepod with a new shuttle design was later used, first appearing in "Darmok". Several previous episodes are referenced during Remmick's investigation, including "Where No One Has Gone Before", "The Battle", "Angel One" and "Justice". In a scene cut from the episode, the crew celebrate Wesley's 16th birthday early on the presumption that he would be away on the day, due to joining the Academy.

Guest stars included playwright-screenwriter Robert Schenkkan (who had been a fan of The Original Series) as Remmick; supporting himself contemporaneously as a working film/television actor, he would go on to receive the 1992 Pulitzer Prize for Drama (The Kentucky Cycle) and the 2014 Tony Award for Best Play (All the Way). Robert Ito had previously been a main cast member on Quincy, M.E.. Guest stars Daniel Riordan and John Putch later appeared in the franchise in different roles. Riordan appeared as a Bajoran in the Deep Space Nine episode "Progress". Putch returned as a different Benzite later in The Next Generation episode "A Matter of Honor" and in the film Star Trek Generations. The events of the episode are followed up in "Conspiracy" which also features the return of Costello and Schenkkan as Quinn and Remmick. Wesley would re-take his Starfleet Academy exam in "Samaritan Snare".

== Reception ==
The episode first aired on March 14, 1988. It received Nielsen ratings of 10.1 million on the first broadcast, which was an increase of over a million viewers from the previous episode "Home Soil", which was watched by 9 million viewers some three weeks prior. The following week's episode, "Heart of Glory", was watched by 10.7 million viewers.

Several reviewers re-watched the episode after the end of the series. Writing for Tor.com, Keith DeCandido questioned why the shuttle bay was not guarded, comparing it to a similar situation in The Original Series episode, "The Doomsday Machine". He also felt that the sequence where the shuttle is bounced off an atmosphere resembled the "Premiere" episode of Farscape. DeCandido said that the exam made no sense, did not present any genuine suspense for the viewer because it was obvious that Wesley and Picard were not due to leave the series. Despite Remmick representing "the ultimate cliché of the jackass interrogator", DeCandido liked the episode. He credited the strong performance by the cast and called Wheaton's performance the best of the first season. DeCandido gave the episode a score of five out of ten. Zack Handlen of The A.V. Club, thought the episode was like "getting a two-parter with no 'To Be Continued...' in the end credits" and felt the episode was "clunky". He felt that the Wesley storyline was clichéd, and that having two unconnected storylines would never have happened in The Original Series. Handlen gave the episode a grade of C.

James Hunt of Den of Geek said that it was a "very good episode" despite being "Wesley-heavy". He recommended that readers watch the episode and described the Remmick interviews and the shuttlecraft sequence as "fantastic". Michelle Erica Green, writing for TrekNation, described the episode as "craptastic" and Wesley as "intolerable". She said that knowing about the "insane" alien parasite conspiracy in "Conspiracy" ahead of time made her look negatively on the episode.

== Home media release ==
"Coming of Age" was first released on VHS cassette in the United States and Canada on November 11, 1992. The episode was included on the Star Trek: The Next Generation season one DVD box set, released in March 2002. The season one Blu-ray set was released on July 24, 2012.
