= Angel One =

- Star Trek: The Next Generation episode
- Episode no.: Season 1 Episode 14
- Directed by: Michael Ray Rhodes
- Written by: Patrick Barry
- Cinematography by: Edward R. Brown
- Production code: 115
- Original air date: January 25, 1988

Guest appearances
- Karen Montgomery – Beata; Sam Hennings – Ramsey; Patricia McPherson – Ariel; Leonard Crofoot – Trent

Episode chronology
← Previous "Datalore"	Next → "11001001"
- Star Trek: The Next Generation season 1

"Angel One" is the fourteenth episode of the first season of the American science fiction television series Star Trek: The Next Generation. It was first broadcast on January 25, 1988, in the United States in broadcast syndication. It was written by Patrick Barry and was directed by Michael Ray Rhodes.

Set in the 24th century, the series follows the adventures of the Starfleet crew of the USS Enterprise (NCC-1701-D). In this episode, an away team visits a world dominated by women to search for survivors of a downed freighter, while the crew of the Enterprise suffer from the effects of a debilitating virus.

The episode was intended to be commentary on apartheid in South Africa, using gender role reversal. However, there were problems between the cast and director during filming, and Patrick Stewart sought to have the sexist nature of the episode changed. The resulting episode was not well liked by members of the production team, and the response from reviewers was negative.

== Plot ==
The Enterprise arrives at the planet Angel One, where its native population is run as an oligarchy, with women in the dominant position of power. The ship is looking for survivors from the freighter Odin which they had believed crashed on the planet seven years previously. An away team consisting of Commander William Riker (Jonathan Frakes), Lt. Commander Data (Brent Spiner), Lt. Tasha Yar (Denise Crosby), and Counselor Deanna Troi (Marina Sirtis) beam down to the surface. They attempt to negotiate with Beata (Karen Montgomery), the leader of the native inhabitants, to let them search for the survivors. Meanwhile the Enterprise deals with a potential threat at a Federation outpost near the Romulan Neutral Zone.

Beata reveals that they are aware of four male survivors of the Odin who have caused disruption in their society, and are considered fugitives. While Beata requests Riker stay with her, the others are able to track down the survivors' camp, and meet with its leader Ramsey (Sam Hennings). Ramsey and his men, having taken wives and started families during the seven years, refuse to leave. They find that one of Beata's assistants, Ariel (Patricia McPherson), has become romantically involved with Ramsey. Riker learns from Beata that their society structure has already been collapsing, but Ramsey and his men have served to accelerate its decline. Meanwhile, a strange virus has been spreading about the Enterprise, after Wesley Crusher (Wil Wheaton) caught a cold whilst skiing on the holodeck incapacitating much of the crew. Doctor Beverly Crusher (Gates McFadden), left in charge of the ship as the highest-ranking non-incapacitated senior officer, finds that the virus is a result of an airborne chemical that becomes viral when inside the human body, and races to find a cure for it while returning the ship to Angel One. The away team returns to the capital attempting to explain to Beata the reason for Ramsey's refusal to leave. Beata and her council reject his reasoning, and capture the men and their families, threatening to execute them. The Enterprise arrives while Riker attempts to convince Ramsey to leave.

Dr. Crusher refuses to allow anyone to beam aboard for fear of being infected, but allows Data, as an android, to return. Riker orders Data to deal with the Neutral Zone situation as quickly as possible. Data affirms that there is a 48-minute window for which Dr. Crusher has to find a cure, and for Riker to defuse the situation on the planet before the ship must leave to the Neutral Zone. On the planet, Ramsey and his men are prepared to be executed by disintegration despite Ariel's pleas, while Dr. Crusher discovers a cure for the virus. Riker is prepared to have the away team and the Odin survivors beamed to the Enterprise, but Beata announces that she will stay the execution and banish Ramsey, his men, their families, and any others that support them to the far side of the planet. She explains that their banishment will not stop the fall of the oligarchy, but will slow it down enough that Beata will not be around to see its end. The away team return to the ship and Picard, already recovering from the virus, orders the ship to the Neutral Zone at high warp.

== Production ==
Producer Herbert Wright explained that the episode was to be a commentary on apartheid in South Africa, with men on the planet representing black people. The original plot by Patrick Barry would have seen Riker and Data travel to the surface with an otherwise all female away team, which offended the planet's leader to the extent that Yar stuns him with a phaser as a show of strength in order to prevent his immediate execution. Riker is imprisoned as one of the marooned men, named Lucas Jones, begins an uprising. Jones is killed, but his death inspires his followers to assault the government. In that version, Picard is the only one to fall ill on board the Enterprise. The reverse role society had already been included in Gene Roddenberry's 1974 TV pilot/movie Planet Earth, and Wright described it as "being done a thousand times already". "Angel One" featured the first TNG mention of the Romulans, who would appear later in the season one finale, "The Neutral Zone".

Michael Ray Rhodes directed the episode as part of a deal with The Bronx Zoo, another television show filmed at Paramount Studios. Rhodes had previously won Emmy Awards on four occasions for his work on the television series Insights between 1981 and 1984. Wil Wheaton later recalled that there were some issues between the main cast and the director, but that he did not know what they were about as he only worked for one day of the shoot. Gates McFadden described it as "one of the most sexist episodes we ever had", and Patrick Stewart sought to have the episode changed to reduce those elements. Some of the production crew subsequently thought poorly of "Angel One". Producer Maurice Hurley described it as "Terrible. Just terrible. One of the ones you'd just as soon erase". Co-producer Herbert Wright felt that the "sexual places it was dragged to were absurd".

== Reception ==
"Angel One" first aired in the United States in broadcast syndication on January 25, 1988. It received an 11.4 rating, meaning that it was seen by 11.4 percent of all households. This was an increase from the previous week's "Datalore" which received a rating of 10.3.

Several reviewers re-watched the episode following the end of the series. Keith DeCandido of Tor.com described the episode as being "one of the most sexist episodes of Star Trek ever produced under the veneer of feminism", and that the virus subplot was "filler, and boring filler at that". He said that it was "one of the absolute low points of the show", giving it a score of two out of ten. Cast member Wil Wheaton watched it for AOL TV, and thought that it started well but soon descended into the appearance of an episode from The Original Series with Riker in the Kirk role. He also noted that if the speech that Riker gave towards the end of the episode had been given to Yar or Troi then the overall message would have been more subtle. He gave it a grade of D overall.

James Hunt for Den of Geek said that the episode was not as bad as "Code of Honor", but that it contained "almost every terrible cliché seen in TNG's first season in one episode". He summed up, "We've seen all of this before, and it was barely interesting the first time around. The second time, it's just tedious. A horrible episode on so many levels." Zack Handlen of The A.V. Club said that he was not sure what the reversal of gender roles in the episode was meant to achieve. He described the virus subplot as "absurd" and gave the episode an F grade.

The episode was included in several worst episode lists, including in one compiled by Scott Thrill for Wired magazine, and it was ranked the fourth worst episode by Jay Garmon at the website TechRepublic. In 2019, Screen Rant ranked "Angel One" among the top 10 worst Star Trek episodes based on IMDb rankings. They also ranked it the fourth worst episode of Star Trek: The Next Generation based on IMDB ratings, which was 5.7 out of 10 at that time.

== Home media release ==
The first home media release of "Angel One" was on VHS cassette, appearing on August 26, 1992, in the United States and Canada. The episode was later included on the Star Trek: The Next Generation season one DVD box set, released in March 2002, and then released as part of the season one Blu-ray set on July 24, 2012.
