= Battle Hell =

Battle Hell may refer to:

- alternative title for World War II 1956 American film The Bold and the Brave
- American title for Chinese Civil War 1957 British film Yangtse Incident: The Story of H.M.S. Amethyst
