= Heart of Glory =

- Star Trek: The Next Generation episode
- The scene where Lieutenant Worf confronts Korris used camera angles not previously seen on the series.
- Episode no.: Season 1 Episode 20
- Directed by: Rob Bowman
- Story by: Maurice Hurley; Herbert Wright; D.C. Fontana
- Teleplay by: Maurice Hurley
- Cinematography by: Edward R. Brown
- Production code: 120
- Original air date: March 21, 1988

Guest appearances
- Vaughn Armstrong – Korris; Charles Hyman – Konmel; David Froman – K'Nera; Robert Bauer – Kunivas; Brad Zerbst – Nurse; Dennis Madalone – Ramos

Episode chronology
← Previous "Coming of Age"	Next → "The Arsenal of Freedom"
- Star Trek: The Next Generation season 1

"Heart of Glory" is the twentieth episode of the first season of the American science fiction television series Star Trek: The Next Generation, first broadcast March 21, 1988. The story was created by Herbert Wright and D. C. Fontana and was made into a script in two days by executive producer Maurice Hurley. The episode was directed by Rob Bowman.

Set in the 24th century, the series follows the adventures of the Starfleet crew of the Federation starship Enterprise-D. In this episode, the crew rescue three Klingons from a damaged freighter in the neutral zone. Once aboard they befriend Lt. Worf (Michael Dorn) and attempt to hijack the Enterprise so they can live as true Klingons, forcing Worf to choose between them or Starfleet.

The episode explained the backstory of the character of Lt. Worf; Michael Dorn was pleased with the outcome. Rob Bowman thought that the episode worked well. He included an overhead shot on the engineering set (which had not been done before on the show) and tweaked the ending. Shots of the Klingon starship were reused from Star Trek: The Motion Picture, while the freighter model would be reused as various freighters throughout the various Star Trek television series. Guest stars included Vaughn Armstrong as Korris in his first role in the franchise and only appearance in The Next Generation. He appeared in a further eleven roles in the franchise, including the part of Admiral Maxwell Forrest in Star Trek: Enterprise. The episode was watched by 10.7 million viewers during the initial broadcast, and reviews by critics were mixed.

== Plot ==
The Enterprise enters the neutral zone, to investigate the distress call of a Talarian freighter. The freighter is badly damaged and three life forms are detected aboard. An away team beams over and finds three Klingons: Korris (Vaughn Armstrong), Konmel (Charles Hyman), and Kunivas (Robert Bauer), the latter found wounded. The away team returns with them to the Enterprise before the freighter explodes. Kunivas is taken to sickbay, and Korris meets with Captain Jean-Luc Picard (Patrick Stewart). The Klingon explains that they were passengers when the freighter was attacked by a Ferengi ship; the Klingons took over the freighter to fend off and destroy the Ferengi ship but the damage sustained left the freighter adrift and faltering. As Korris and Konmel are shown to quarters, they are surprised to hear about a fellow Klingon, Lt. Worf (Michael Dorn), who is serving within Starfleet.

Kunivas' condition worsens; Korris, Konmel and Worf are present when he dies. The three let out a fierce roar as per Klingon custom (a warning to the dead that a Klingon warrior is about to arrive). As they return to the Klingons' quarters, Konmel is disappointed that Kunivas was not killed by an enemy, leading Worf to question the nature of the attack on the freighter; Korris and Konmel quickly change the subject. Worf forces Korris to reveal the truth: the three had commandeered the freighter, to seek out a place they could live as true Klingons and the damage to the freighter was a result of a battle with a Klingon ship. When the two are seen near the ship's battle bridge, hoping to steal the drive section and escape, they are placed in the brig.

The Enterprise is soon met by a Klingon battlecruiser, captained by Commander K'Nera (David Froman), who demands the return of the fugitive Klingons. Knowing that Korris and Konmel will be tried and executed if they are returned, Worf argues instead for their exile to a hostile planet but K'Nera refuses. Korris and Konmel use parts secreted on their uniforms to assemble a disruptor pistol and escape from the brig; Konmel is killed as Korris takes over the Engineering deck. Picard and Worf race to Engineering and Worf tries to reason with Korris who is threatening to destroy the warp core and take the Enterprise with him. Korris attempts to persuade Worf to come with him and conquer the galaxy as a true Klingon, but Worf retorts that a true Klingon fights out of honor and loyalty and that Korris has demonstrated neither. Korris is enraged and Worf takes the opportunity to shoot him dead. K'Nera is told of the deaths of the fugitives and Worf declares that they "died well", when asked of their manner of death. Worf agrees to consider an offer to serve aboard the Klingon battlecruiser after his service aboard the Enterprise is complete, but when communications with K'Nera are broken off, he assures the bridge crew he was just being polite.

== Production ==
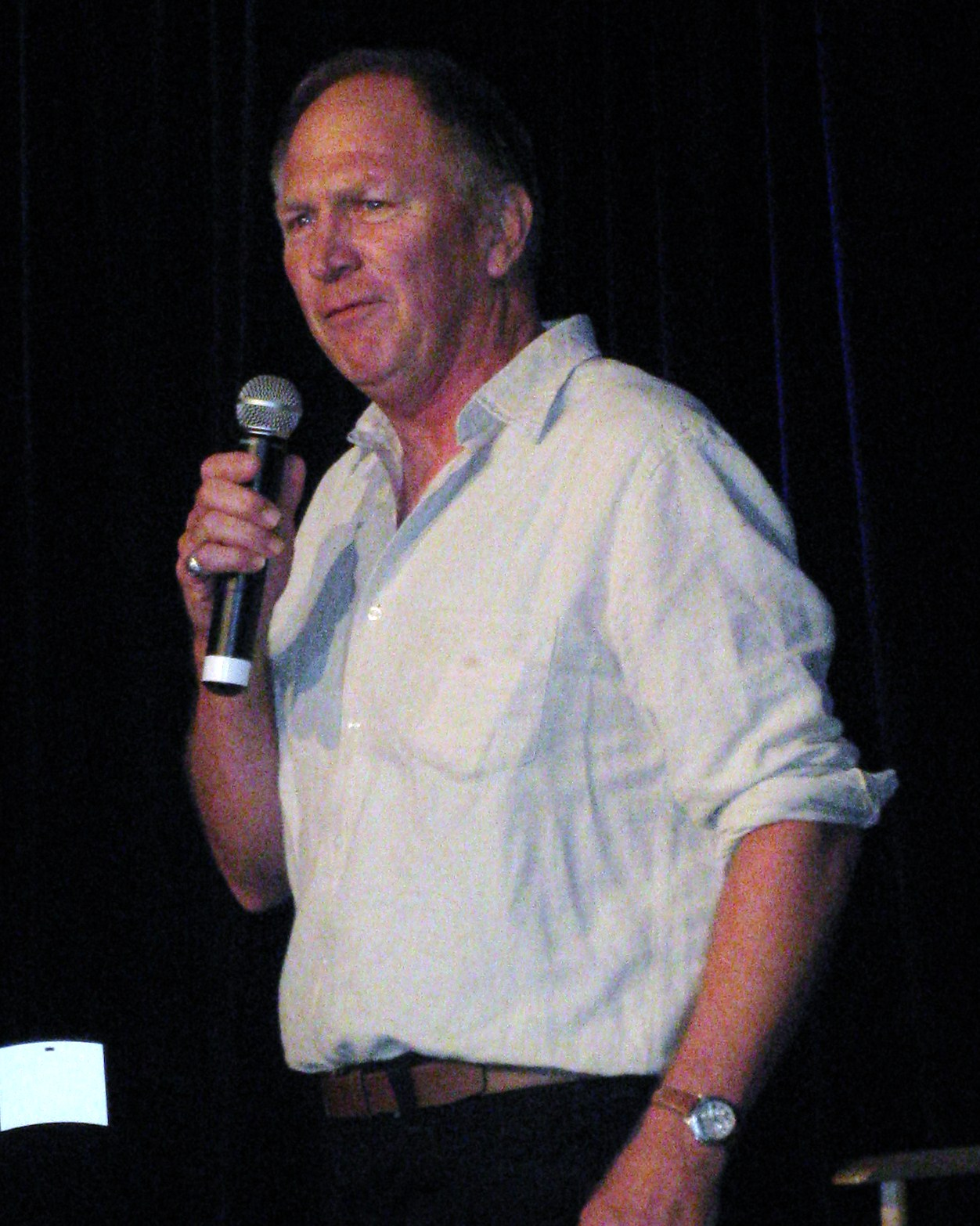
"Heart of Glory" featured the first Star Trek role for actor Vaughn Armstrong. He appeared as eleven other characters throughout the franchise.

Writer and executive producer Maurice Hurley thought that "Heart of Glory" was the closest experience he had on the show to directly place his philosophy into a script. He later credited fellow co-executive producer Rick Berman with helping to write the script for "Heart of Glory", saying "When I had a problem, I could go in and we could sit there, close the door, yell and scream. I'd pace, he'd make suggestions. The two of us made stories work in that room that had to be shot within a couple of days. We were under enormous time pressure, and we were working hand in glove. We had a wonderful time, on that show, especially." Hurley wrote the screenplay in two days from a story created by Herbert Wright and D. C. Fontana. Because of the delays, the Klingon language portions of the script didn't make any actual sense in translation and were simply Klingon sounding words created by Hurley.

The story explained Lt. Worf's background for the first time in the series, including the story of Romulan betrayal at Khitomer which saw the death of his parents. While his foster parents were first mentioned in this episode, they were not seen until the fourth season episode "Family" and his stepbrother didn't appear on the show until the seventh season episode "Homeward". Michael Dorn was pleased with the outcome of this episode as he felt it showed the producers that the fans were just as interested in his character as the others in the main cast. He felt that it could have been taken further and wanted there to be an epic battle at the end of the episode. The Klingon battlecruiser seen in "Heart of Glory" was footage re-used from Star Trek: The Motion Picture, while the freighter was a general model which would come to be reused throughout The Next Generation and other Star Trek television series.

The director, Rob Bowman, made bold decisions in designing the confrontation sequence. The scripted version showed the fight between Worf and Korris taking place entirely on the first deck of the engineering section. Instead, Bowman had them fight on the upper deck and using camera angles never before seen on the show, filmed vertical sequences in that part of the set. He also altered the script so that Konmel needed to be hit by three phaser blasts. Bowman used a steadicam to film the scenes on the freighter to give a rough effect to the footage. He was pleased with the outcome, describing it as the easiest of all of the Next Generation episodes he directed. He said that it was a show where "every hand we had was a 21. It just worked."

Guest stars in this episode included Robert Bauer, who had previously been in a band with Michael Dorn, as Kunivas. Stuntman Dennis Madalone made his second appearance in The Next Generation with this episode, having previously appeared earlier in the season in "Where No One Has Gone Before". He would continue to appear as various crewmen through the rest of the series. "Heart of Glory" was the only appearance in The Next Generation for actor Vaughn Armstrong. He would, however, go on to play a further eleven roles in the Star Trek franchise, including as the recurring character of Admiral Maxwell Forrest in Star Trek: Enterprise.

== Reception ==
"Heart of Glory" was first broadcast in the United States on March 21, 1988, in broadcast syndication. The episode received Nielsen ratings of 10.7 million on the first broadcast, which was an increase over the 10.1 million received by the previous episode, "Coming of Age". Only the episode "Symbiosis" received a higher rating by the end of the season.

=== Critical response ===
Several reviewers re-watched the episode after the end of the series. Keith DeCandido reviewed the episode for Tor.com in July 2011. DeCandido is a novelist and has produced works based in the Star Trek universe, and describes himself as "the Klingon guy" as far as Star Trek novelists are concerned. He was not overly pleased with the episode, describing the plot as being slow and saying that Michael Dorn's acting was "mediocre" but would get "much much better" later in the series. He praised David Froman as K'Nera, describing him as having "tremendous presence" and thought that although Vaughn Armstrong was excellent as Admiral Forrest in Enterprise, in this early episode he was "overly histrionic". He described the overhead shot of Worf after the death of Korris as "just silly", and thought that the episode overall was a "forgettable mess". He gave it a rating of four out of ten. Zack Handlen, writing for The A.V. Club in May 2010, thought that the first act of "Heart of Glory" was slow, but it improved after that and said that "while it's not exactly a tear-jerker, it allows Worf the dignity the character needs to work". He had mixed feelings about the Klingon death ritual but felt that it was justified at the end of the episode as the complex nature of the character of Korris made the sense of loss feel earned. He gave the episode a grade of B+.

Michelle Erica Green watched the episode for TrekNation in August 2007, and described it as one of her favourite episodes from the first season. She thought it laid the groundwork for later episodes in The Next Generation, Deep Space Nine and Voyager regarding the Klingon culture. She felt that the drama seemed artificial and that the writers forced a situation where Worf had to kill one of the Klingons as if "justifying the brutality as necessary for the good of Starfleet". Jamahl Epsicokhan at his website "Jammer's Reviews" also thought that the drama with Worf deciding whether or not to join the Klingons was questionable. He thought it was hard to believe that the crew seemed to know Worf as little as they did at this point in the series but praised it for being the starting point for Klingon-based stories in the franchise. He gave it a score of three out of four.

== Home media release ==
The first home media release of "Heart of Glory" was on VHS cassette, appearing on November 11, 1992 in the United States and Canada. The episode was later included on the Star Trek: The Next Generation season one DVD box set, released in March 2002. The season one Blu-ray set was released on July 24, 2012.
