= We'll Always Have Paris (Star Trek: The Next Generation) =

- Star Trek: The Next Generation episode
- Episode no.: Season 1 Episode 24
- Directed by: Robert Becker
- Written by: Deborah Dean Davis; Hannah Louise Shearer
- Cinematography by: Edward R. Brown
- Production code: 124
- Original air date: May 2, 1988

Guest appearances
- Michelle Phillips – Jenice Manheim; Rod Loomis – Paul Manheim; Isabel Lorca – Gabrielle; Dan Kern - Dean; Jean-Paul Vignon – Edourd; Kelly Ashmore – Francine; Lance Spellerberg – Transporter Chief

Episode chronology
← Previous "Skin of Evil"	Next → "Conspiracy"
- Star Trek: The Next Generation season 1

"We'll Always Have Paris" is the twenty-fourth episode of the first season of the American science fiction television series Star Trek: The Next Generation, first aired on May 2, 1988, in broadcast syndication. The story and script were both created by Deborah Dean Davis and Hannah Louise Shearer, and the episode was directed by Robert Becker.

Set in the 24th century, the series follows the adventures of the Starfleet crew of the Federation starship Enterprise-D. In this episode, the crew respond to a distress call from Dr. Paul Manheim (Rod Loomis). While the crew must deal with the results of Manheim's haywire experiments with time, Captain Picard (Patrick Stewart) must deal with his former love Jenice (Michelle Phillips), who is also Manheim's wife.

The story of the episode was influenced by the film Casablanca, and was affected by the timing of the 1988 Writers Guild of America strike. Because of the strike, the script was written in five days and it was only when it was filmed that it was discovered to be incomplete. Shearer was not happy with the result and felt that the on-screen chemistry of Stewart and Phillips was lacking.

== Plot ==
The Enterprise, along with other ships in the sector, experience a localized time-distortion and soon after receive a distress-call from Dr. Paul Manheim in a nearby system. Captain Picard (Patrick Stewart) recalls that Manheim was ejected from the Federation Science Institute for conducting unauthorized experiments; he feels awkward about meeting Manheim because he once had a relationship with Manheim's wife, Jenice, before abandoning her in Paris to become a starship captain.

They find the distress signal coming from a facility on a planetoid surrounded by a force-field. Manheim and Jenice are the only survivors of the research team, and Manheim needs immediate medical attention. The two are brought aboard and while Dr. Crusher (Gates McFadden) tends to Dr. Manheim, who is having convulsions, Jenice has an awkward reunion with Picard. She also alerts the crew to numerous security protocols that her husband has installed at the facility. As the crew prepares to send an away-team to investigate the laboratory, they experience more time distortions, described by Data (Brent Spiner) as "Manheim effects". In one instance Picard, Riker and Data enter a turbolift only to see their past selves conversing outside of the lift. The crew find that they cannot complete a transporter beam to the facility due to the security measures in place there.

Dr. Manheim recovers long enough to explain that he was doing experiments involving time, gravity and funnels to other universes and suspects his last experiment is running out of control. Manheim explains that he is trapped between two dimensions and Data determines that the experiment must be shut down during a time fluctuation or else it will simply grow larger. Manheim provides the crew with the correct coordinates to beam down to avoid the security fields. Picard admits to Jenice that he worried about losing her again after he left her in Paris and vows to correct Dr. Manheim's experiment.

As he is affected less by the distortions, Data is sent down alone and disables the remaining security measures before entering Manheim's laboratory. He finds a column of energy emanating from a dimensional matrix, the source of the time distortions. Data, though briefly affected by the time distortions, is able to add anti-matter to the matrix, causing the matrix to stabilize and halt the time distortions. Dr. Manheim recovers and he and Jenice thank Picard and the crew for their help. Picard and Jenice use the holodeck to recreate one more encounter at a Paris café, before she returns with her husband to the planet.

== Production ==
"We'll Always Have Paris" is named in reference to the Humphrey Bogart and Ingrid Bergman film Casablanca. As well as the title of the episode and the love triangle in the story, the Blue Parrot Café from the film is directly mentioned by Captain Picard. Casablanca was also the basis for the earlier Star Trek: The Original Series novel The Entropy Effect, and would be so again in the Deep Space Nine episode "Profit and Loss".

The story was originally pitched by Hannah Louise Shearer and Deborah Dean Davis, who were also given the job of developing the script. The writing of the episode suffered from the timing of the 1988 Writers Guild of America strike, with Shearer and Dean Davis completing the script in five days. The premise of the story was a combination of their idea of a story "about a professor whose work wasn't appreciated and had to go off on his own" and that of Maurice Hurley who wanted a story with a time anomaly. The final draft was dated 22 February and featured numerous differences from the filmed version, including Jenice being called Laura, a number of different interactions for the crew, and Riker, Worf and Data being involved in shutting down Manheim's equipment. The script was completed a week before the episode was filmed but the writers strike caused further problems when it was discovered during filming that the scene where Data was to fix the time distortions had not been completed.

Robert Legato and Rick Berman spent forty minutes on the telephone with Shearer during the strike. While she refused to write the lines during the strike, Berman suggested dialogue and Shearer would give opinions with Legato taking down handwritten notes. Legato decided on the directing notes himself and used a whip pan shot instead of an effects shot to film the three Datas as director Robert Becker had never used effects shots. Shearer was not happy with the final result, saying "we were writing the most romantic episode in the world" but that "it was toned down 75%".

Shearer later complained of a lack of chemistry between Michelle Phillips and Patrick Stewart, which Phillips blamed on the conflicted nature of the character in that she was committed to her husband but also wanted to see Picard once more. Lance Spellerberg would later return in "The Icarus Factor" where his transporter chief gained the name Ensign Herbert. The image of 24th-century Paris was a matte painting which was re-used in Star Trek VI: The Undiscovered Country, where it was hung outside the office of the Federation president.

== Reception ==
"We'll Always Have Paris" aired in broadcast syndication during the week commencing May 5, 1988. It received Nielsen ratings of 9.7, reflecting the percentage of all households watching the episode during its timeslot. This was the same ratings received as the previous episode, "Skin of Evil".

Several reviewers re-watched the episode after the end of the series. Michelle Erica Green reviewed the episode on behalf of TrekNation in September 2007, comparing certain elements of the episode to Casablanca and the series finale "All Good Things...". These included the ending where time distortions caused Data to be replicated three times in "We'll Always Have Paris" compared to the similar situation with three Picards in "All Good Things...". Overall she thought that the episode was better than she recalled previously. Jamahl Epsicokhan at his website "Jammer's Reviews" described the episode as too simple, especially the ending which he said was "they give Data a canister, which he sticks into a hall of mirrors; problem solved".

Zack Handlen, reviewing the episode for The A.V. Club in May 2010, said that he enjoyed the "time blips" in the episode, but that he was not a fan of the romance between Jenice and Picard. He also felt that there was not much follow-up on Manheim's experiments and that he seemed to be left to cause a more serious accident in the future. Keith DeCandido watched the episode for Tor.com in July 2011. He thought that Michele Phillips was "incredibly radiant", and said, "there’s nothing I can point to at this episode and say is wrong, but it’s one of the more forgettable episodes", giving it a score of four out of ten.

== Home media release ==
The first home media release of "We'll Always Have Paris" was on VHS cassette was on July 1, 1992 in the United States and Canada. The episode was later included on the Star Trek: The Next Generation season one DVD box set, released in March 2002, and was released as part of the season one Blu-ray set on July 24, 2012.
