= Skin of Evil =

- Star Trek: The Next Generation episode
- Episode no.: Season 1 Episode 23
- Directed by: Joseph L. Scanlan
- Story by: Joseph Stefano
- Teleplay by: Joseph Stefano; Hannah Louise Shearer
- Cinematography by: Edward R. Brown
- Production code: 122
- Original air date: April 25, 1988

Guest appearances
- Mart McChesney as Armus; Ron Gans as Voice of Armus; Walker Boone as Leland T. Lynch; Brad Zerbst as Nurse; Raymond Forchion as Ben Prieto

Episode chronology
← Previous "Symbiosis"	Next → "We'll Always Have Paris"
- Star Trek: The Next Generation season 1

"Skin of Evil" is the 23rd episode of the first season of the American science fiction television series Star Trek: The Next Generation; it first aired on April 25, 1988, in broadcast syndication. The story premise was written by Joseph Stefano, whose teleplay was re-written by Hannah Louise Shearer. The episode was directed by Joseph L. Scanlan.

Set in the 24th century, the series follows the adventures of the Starfleet crew of the Federation starship Enterprise-D. In this episode, the Enterprise races to rescue Deanna Troi (Marina Sirtis), who is being held captive by Armus, an alien life-form (Mart McChesney, voiced by Ron Gans). In investigating the crash, Lieutenant Tasha Yar (Denise Crosby) is killed by Armus; Troi is eventually rescued after Captain Picard (Patrick Stewart) distracts the alien.

Yar's death in the episode was the result of Crosby's request to be released from her contract. (Episodes were filmed out of order; the last first-season Yar episode filmed was "Symbiosis", which in first-run syndication immediately preceded "Skin of Evil".) The manner of Yar's death was intended to be typical of the threat posed to a security officer, and was what the show's creator Gene Roddenberry had intended. The episode was received poorly by most critics, who rejected in particular the Armus creature and the manner of Yar's death.

== Plot ==
The Enterprise receives a distress signal from a shuttlecraft returning Deanna Troi from a conference. They find that the shuttle has crashed on a desolate planet, Vagra II, and while they can find the life signs of Troi and the pilot, Lt. Ben Prieto (Raymond Forchion), they are unable to beam the two to the ship. An away team beams down and discovers an animated pool of a tar-like substance, a malevolent life form that calls itself Armus. When Lt. Yar attempts to approach the shuttle, Armus hurls her back with a psychokinetic blast, killing her instantly. The away team is brought back to the Enterprise but the injuries to Yar are too great for Dr. Crusher (Gates McFadden) to remedy and they are unable to resuscitate her. A second away team is sent to the planet; Armus taunts the crew members and maintains his grasp of the shuttle. Troi has communicated with Armus and learned that it is a physical manifestation of evil from the bodies of an ancient race, abandoned on Vagra II.

The Enterprise scans Armus' energy field, finding that when he expresses his rage to Troi rather than suppressing it, the field weakens, which could allow them to beam Troi and Prieto out of the shuttle. After Armus toys with Troi by completely engulfing Commander Riker (Jonathan Frakes), Captain Picard beams down to speak to Armus directly, sending the rest of the away team to the ship. Picard engages Armus in a heated discussion to discover its motive, which is to seek revenge on those that abandoned it on Vagra II. Armus is angered to a point where the energy field is dissipated enough, allowing for Picard, Troi and Prieto to be safely beamed back to the Enterprise, leaving Armus wailing in fury and alone once again. After destroying the shuttlecraft from orbit, Picard orders a permanent quarantine on Vagra II.

As they leave Vagra II, the crew holds a memorial service for Lt. Yar, with a recorded simulation of Yar addressing each of the senior crew members telling them what they meant to her and what she learned from each of them. After the service, Data (Brent Spiner), who had previously become close to Yar, tells Picard that he is confused as to the purpose of the service. He says that his thoughts are not for Tasha but for himself, because he can only think of how empty his life will be without her. He asks if he has missed the point, but Picard assures him he got it.

== Production ==
=== Story and casting ===
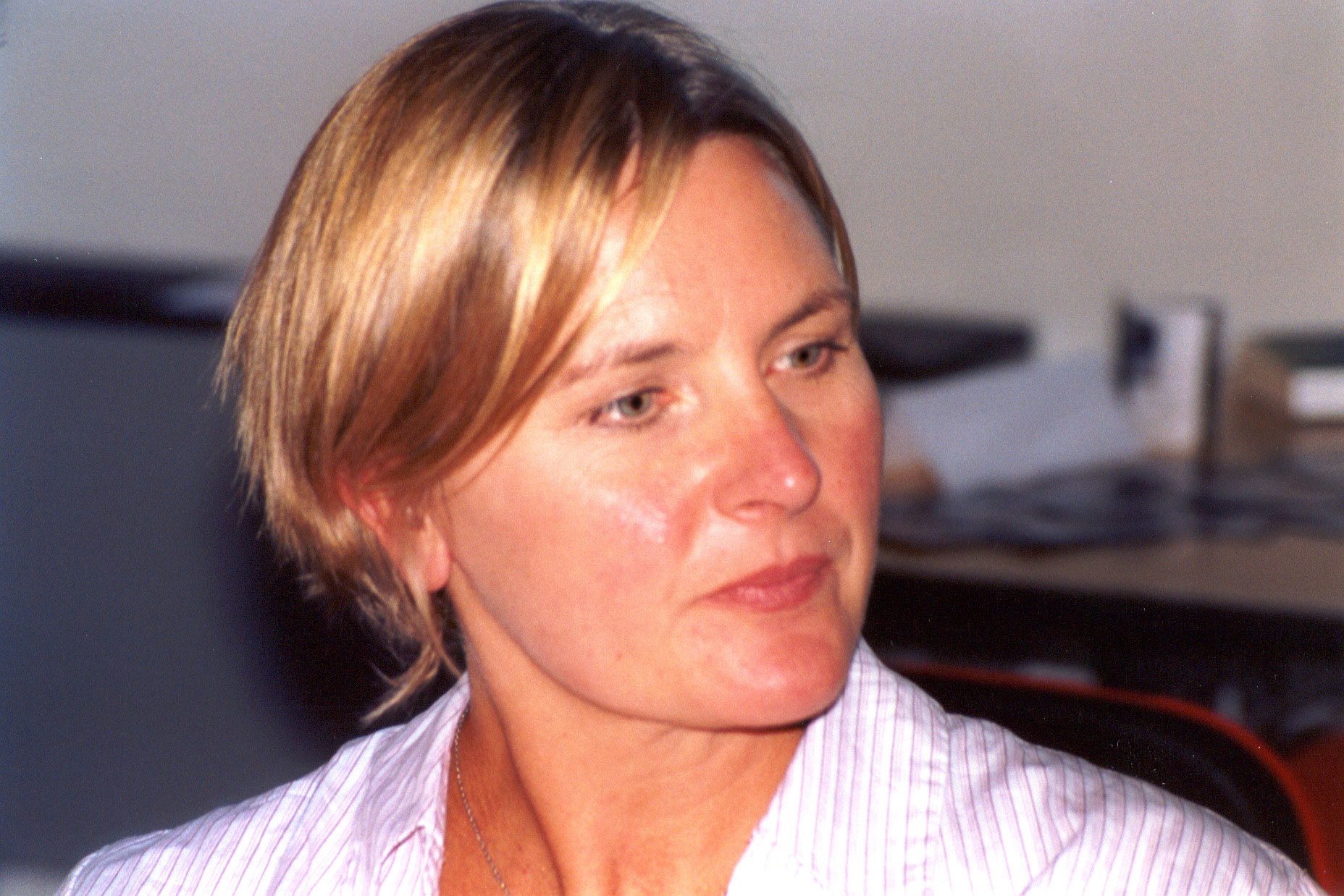
Denise Crosby's character, Tasha Yar, was killed off in this episode after the actress asked to be released from her contract.

The original story, then titled "The Shroud", was written by Joseph Stefano, who had previously worked on The Outer Limits. Hannah Louise Shearer was given the task of re-writing the original take. The first draft had Yar's death occur earlier in the episode with the main focus of the episode being the Armus creature rather than her death. It was the show's creator Gene Roddenberry who argued in favor of her sudden demise as he felt it was suitable for a security officer. Roddenberry also argued against killing Armus in retaliation. Shearer later described the decision, saying "Gene felt we couldn't kill the creature, because it is not up to us as human beings to make a moral judgement on any creature that we encounter, because we are not God".

Yar's death in the episode was after Crosby had asked to be let out of her contract, and rumors had circulated of her departure. She later described her time spent on Star Trek: The Next Generation as "miserable", and it was well known at the time that she was unhappy with the way her role had been developed. She later said that if she'd had more scenes written for her similar to the one she shared with Worf at the start of the episode then she wouldn't have wanted to leave the show. Yar's memorial scene was filmed twice, the first was with Crosby reciting the lines while looking straight ahead, which was the director's preferred choice. However a version with her looking towards each of the other characters in turn was ultimately used. Scanlan later said "Don't ask me how she knew where they'd be standing". Marina Sirtis's tears in the scene were real; she was cued by Crosby standing off camera. "Skin of Evil" was not the last episode in the first season in which Denise Crosby appeared. "Symbiosis" was subsequently filmed after this episode, but was aired earlier in the run. Crosby would also later return to the Yar role in "Yesterday's Enterprise"; in the series finale, "All Good Things..."; and as Yar's half-Romulan daughter, Sela, in several episodes. Guest stars in "Skin of Evil" included Walker Boone as Leland T. Lynch, Brad Zerbst as a nurse and Raymond Forchion as Ben Prieto.

=== Creature effects ===
Armus was created without any optical effects.

Armus was originally intended to be based on the Mummenschanz theatre group style, but was discarded in favor of a "shroud" type creature. Director Joseph L. Scanlan was determined to make the creature believable, and it was aimed to have the creature rise up out of the oil slick, drawing it up with him. A test was made using a melting miniature figure of Armus with the intention to play it in reverse, but it didn't provide the required effect. The construction of the suit for Mart McChesney to wear as Armus was split between two teams. Michael Westmore and Gerald Quist spent a day sculpting the head, while the construction of the body was outsourced to an external company. McChesney as Armus was lowered into and out of the oil by means of a grate under the surface. Although the head was designed to enable the clearing of McChesney's airways quickly should there be a problem, no oxygen tank was included in the construction and so he had to hold his breath whilst under the surface of the oil. Crewmembers kept track of the length of time he was under by using a stopwatch. The oil itself was a water-soluble Metamucil material which was dyed black using printer's ink.

During production the crew found that for some reason the liquid kept dissolving the seams of the suit, although the head was unaffected. A backup suit had been ordered before production began at the last minute, and was required in order to shoot all the scenes. After they started to break apart, further orders were placed for additional suits and all the suits used eventually fell apart during the four days they were used on set. In order to film one scene, McChesney wore the suit open-backed due to the damage.

No optical effects were used in creating Armus. For the scene where Riker is pulled into the oil, a stuntman was used as a stand in for Jonathan Frakes. Where Riker's face emerges from the oil, it was actually a plaster cast of Frakes' face painted black. It was placed on the same grate used to lift McChesney, and filmed lifting out of the liquid. The twitching effect in Yar's death was due to a wire tied around Crosby's waist being pulled on.

== Reception ==
"Skin of Evil" aired in broadcast syndication during the week commencing April 29, 1988. It received Nielsen ratings of 9.7, reflecting the percentage of all households watching the episode during its timeslot. This was a decrease of 1.1 ratings points from the previous episode, "Symbiosis", and was the same ratings level received by the following episode, "We'll Always Have Paris".

Several reviewers re-watched Star Trek: The Next Generation after the end of the series. Zack Handlen for The A.V. Club gave the episode an overall score of C−, saying that at points the episode just got annoying especially when Troi was describing Armus' feelings. He thought that Yar's death scene was out of place in the episode and that overall Armus was unthreatening, saying "Murdering Yar should make Armus seem much more dangerous, but he's just so whiny and petulant and bland that he could've killed half a dozen cast members without leaving an impression." Keith DeCandido for Tor.com thought that Yar's death was "pointless", but thought that it was in a manner suitable for a security officer in Star Trek. He also felt that it was one of Troi's better episodes, but that Armus "fails in every possible way as a villain, and that’s entirely on the backs of the people doing the visual effects and the voice casting."

IGN reviewer RL Shaffer thought it was a "silly episode, riddled with terrible dialogue, that's only notable because of Tasha Yar's untimely death". It was given a score of five out of ten, marking it as one of the worst four episodes of the season. Yar's death was included in a list of the top 21 "Naff Sci-Fi Deaths" by SFX magazine in 2012, and was also listed by the magazine as a bad example of a "Somebody Dies Episode".

In 2016, The Hollywood Reporter ranked this the 89th best episode the entire Star Trek franchise, prior to Star Trek: Discovery, noting how shocking it was that a main character was killed off.

In May 2019, The Hollywood Reporter ranked "Skin of Evil" among the top twenty five episodes of Star Trek: The Next Generation, highlighting how hard it was for the crew to lose a team member.

== Home media release ==
The first home media release of "Skin of Evil" was on VHS cassette on November 11, 1992. The episode was later included on the Star Trek: The Next Generation season one DVD box set, released in March 2002. It was released as part of the season one Blu-ray set on July 24, 2012.
