= Mart McChesney =

American film and television actor

- McChesney in Girls Nite Out, 1982
- Born: Mart Dayne McChesney; January 27, 1954; Abilene, Texas, U.S.
- Died: January 14, 1999 (aged 44); Los Angeles, California, U.S.
- Occupation(s): Film and television actor

Mart Dayne McChesney (January 27, 1954 – January 14, 1999) was an American film and television actor. He was best known for his appearances in Star Trek: The Next Generation as the tar creature Armus in the first season episode "Skin of Evil", and as Sheliak in the third season episode "The Ensigns of Command". For his Star Trek: The Next Generation appearances, he wore heavy prosthetics and costumes. Footage of his appearance as Armus was re-used in the series second season episode "Shades of Gray". He also starred as Pete 'Maniac' Krizaniac in the 1982 horror film, Girls Nite Out, starring along with Rutanya Alda.

McChesney died from complications of AIDS in Los Angeles, California on January 14, 1999, at the age of 44.
