= Robert Lewin (screenwriter) =

American screenwriter and television producer

- Born: May 9, 1920; New York City, US
- Died: August 28, 2004 (aged 84); Santa Monica, California, US
- Occupation: Screenwriter
- Years active: 1956–1988

Robert Lewin (May 9, 1920 – August 28, 2004) was an American screenwriter and television producer. He was nominated for an Academy Award for The Bold and the Brave, and Emmy nominated for the television series The Paper Chase and Baretta.

== Early life ==
Robert Lewin was born in New York, and went on to attend Yale University before serving as an officer in the United States Army during the Second World War. He subsequently became a reporter for both Life magazine and the Atlanta Constitution. Following that, he formed a publicity firm, Lewin, Kaufman and Schwartz, with Leonard Kaufman and Marving Schwartz. Lewin and his wife, Elyse, had three children, Cheryl, James and Lian.

== Screenwriting ==
Following his experiences during the Second World War, as a captain commanding an anti-tank unit, he wrote the screenplay for The Bold and the Brave. It was his first screenplay, and he was subsequently nominated for an Academy Award for Best Original Screenplay.

He moved on to write for television, working on a variety of shows including winning awards from the Writers Guild of America in both 1968 and 1969 for his work on Judd, for the Defense. He also worked as a producer and was nominated for Emmy Awards for The Paper Chase and Baretta. In January 1987, he was invited to be a producer on Star Trek: The Next Generation by the franchise creator, Gene Roddenberry. The pair had previously worked together on the original Mission: Impossible television series. Lewin's work on that series included co-writing the episode "Datalore", which was the final episode of Star Trek written by Roddenberry. The other episodes that he was credited for writing were "Symbiosis", "11001001" and "The Arsenal of Freedom". Lewin retired after working on the show during the first season, with Maurice Hurley hired to replace him as head writer.
