= Ursaline Bryant =

American actress

- Born: November 4, 1947 (age 78); Washington, D.C., United States
- Occupation: Actress

Ursaline Bryant (born November 4, 1947) is an actress who has appeared in several films from the 1970s to 1990s. She played starship Captain Tryla Scott in the Star Trek: The Next Generation episode "Conspiracy". She also had a memorable role as a prostitute in The Golden Girls episode "Ladies of the Evening".
