= Merritt Butrick =

American actor (1959–1989)

- Born: Merritt R. Butrick; September 3, 1959; Gainesville, Florida, U.S.
- Died: March 17, 1989 (aged 29); Hollywood, California, U.S.
- Occupation: Actor
- Years active: 1981–1989

Merritt R. Butrick (September 3, 1959 – March 17, 1989) was an American actor, known for his roles on the teen sitcom Square Pegs (1982), in two Star Trek feature films, and a variety of other acting roles in the 1980s.

== Early life and career ==
Butrick was born in Gainesville, Florida, and was an only child. He graduated in 1977 from Tamalpais High School in Mill Valley, California. He attended the California Institute of the Arts for acting, but did not complete his degree.

His first screen role was as a rapist in two 1981 episodes of the police drama Hill Street Blues.

He was cast as John "Johnny Slash" Ulasewicz, a major supporting character in the teen sitcom Square Pegs (1982), which received critical praise but was cancelled after one season of 20 episodes. The character was described by one critic as an "apparent (but never declared) gay student."

While Square Pegs was in pre-broadcast production, Butrick was cast to play David Marcus, the son of James T. Kirk (William Shatner) and his former lover Carol Marcus (Bibi Besch), in Star Trek II: The Wrath of Khan (1982). He continued the role in the follow-up film Star Trek III: The Search for Spock (1984), in which the character was killed. He later appeared as T'Jon, the captain of a cargo vessel rescued by the crew of the Enterprise in "Symbiosis" (1988), an episode of Star Trek: The Next Generation.

Meanwhile, he appeared in the comedy film Zapped! (1982), the horror film Fright Night Part 2 (1988), and as Barbara Hershey's hillbilly son in the drama film Shy People (1987). He had a variety of guest roles on television series and television films.

He received critical praise from Time magazine for his performance at the Los Angeles Theatre Center in the play Kingfish, in which he played a ditzy, petulant muscle-boy prostitute. It was his last acting role.

== Death and legacy ==
Butrick died of toxoplasmosis, complicated by AIDS, on March 17, 1989, at the age of 29. He has at least two panels dedicated to him as part of the NAMES Project AIDS Memorial Quilt, both referencing his role as David Marcus.

The 2008 release of Square Pegs on DVD included a featurette dedicated to Butrick in which his co-stars Jami Gertz and Sarah Jessica Parker, and series creator Anne Beatts, paid tributes to and recounted anecdotes about Butrick.

Butrick's Star Trek III co-star Robin Curtis offered similar praise on the DVD commentary for that film. Director Nicholas Meyer, who had directed him in Star Trek II, included a scene in Star Trek VI: The Undiscovered Country (1991), in which Captain Kirk puts a photograph of his murdered son on his desk.

== Filmography ==
Film
Year	Title	Role	Notes
1982	Star Trek II: The Wrath of Khan	Dr. David Marcus	
1982	Zapped!	Gary Cooter	
1984	Star Trek III: The Search for Spock	Dr. David Marcus	
1985	Head Office	John Hudson	
1986	Wired to Kill	Reegus, The Gang Leader	Alternative title: Booby Trap
1987	Shy People	Mike	
1988	Fright Night Part 2	Richie	
1989	Death Spa	David Avery	(final film role)
Television
Year	Title	Role	Notes
1981	Hill Street Blues	Rapist	2 episodes
1981	Splendor in the Grass	Glenn	TV movie
1981	CHiPs	Kevin Whalen	1 episode
1982–1983	Square Pegs	Johnny Slash	20 episodes
1983	When Your Lover Leaves	Aaron Scott	TV movie
1984	Fame	Billy Christiansen	1 episode
1984	Sweet Revenge	Captain Paul Dennison	TV movie
1985	Promises to Keep	Reg	TV movie
1986	Blood & Orchids	Duane York	TV movie
1986	Stagecoach	Lieutenant Blanchard	TV movie
1986	When the Bough Breaks	Tim Kruger	TV movie
1987	Vietnam War Story	Siska	1 episode
1987	Beauty and the Beast	Shake	1 episode
1987	The Law & Harry McGraw		1 episode
1988	Why on Earth?	Oscar	TV movie
1988	Jake and the Fatman	Taylor Fleming	1 episode
1988	Star Trek: The Next Generation	T'Jon	Episode: "Symbiosis"
1988	Hooperman		1 episode
1989	From the Dead of Night	Rick	TV movie
