= Conspiracy (Star Trek: The Next Generation) =

- Star Trek: The Next Generation episode
- Dexter Remmick's host body and queen parasite are destroyed by Picard and Riker. Such scenes made the broadcast of the episode controversial.
- Episode no.: Season 1 Episode 25
- Directed by: Cliff Bole
- Story by: Robert Sabaroff
- Teleplay by: Tracy Tormé
- Cinematography by: Edward R. Brown
- Production code: 125
- Original air date: May 9, 1988

Guest appearances
- Henry Darrow – Admiral Savar; Ward Costello – Admiral Gregory Quinn; Robert Schenkkan – Lt. Cdr. Dexter Remmick; Ray Reinhardt – Admiral Aaron; Jonathan Farwell – Captain Walker Keel; Michael Berryman – Captain Rixx; Ursaline Bryant – Captain Tryla Scott

Episode chronology
← Previous "We'll Always Have Paris"	Next → "The Neutral Zone"
- Star Trek: The Next Generation season 1

"Conspiracy" is the twenty-fifth and penultimate episode of the first season of the syndicated American science fiction television series Star Trek: The Next Generation, originally aired on May 9, 1988, in the United States. The premise was conceived by the show's creator Gene Roddenberry in a single sentence overview titled "The Assassins", being expanded into a thirty-page story by Robert Sabaroff. From this, the teleplay was produced by Tracy Tormé and the episode directed by Cliff Bole.

Set in the 24th century, the series follows the adventures of the Starfleet crew of the Federation starship Enterprise-D. Following a meeting with a fellow captain, the strange behavior of high-ranking officers leads Jean-Luc Picard (Patrick Stewart) and the crew of the Enterprise to uncover a conspiracy of senior Starfleet officers possessed by parasitic aliens who are preparing to invade the United Federation of Planets.

Numerous make-up effects were created by make-up supervisor Michael Westmore, including an exploding head using raw meat. There were concerns by producers that some of the effects were too graphic, but after a viewing by a staff member's son, they decided to broadcast it uncut. The episode has subsequently been included in some best episode lists of the series, and won one of three Primetime Emmy Awards for The Next Generation's first season. Controversial when originally broadcast, the more graphic elements were cut or banned from broadcast in the United Kingdom, and required a warning before airing in Canada.

== Plot ==
Captain Picard receives a highly confidential message from Captain Walker Keel of the USS Horatio. Keel refuses to discuss his concerns and insists on a face-to-face meeting. At the meeting, Keel reports strange orders from Starfleet headquarters and what he implies are suspicious deaths of Starfleet officers and expresses concern of a conspiracy. After their meeting, the Enterprise finds that the Horatio has been destroyed. Picard has Lt. Commander Data review all orders issued by Starfleet Command in the past six months. Data finds several strange orders from the senior levels of Starfleet and Picard orders the Enterprise to Earth. As it approaches Earth, a transmission is received from a trio of Starfleet admirals, Savar, Aaron and Quinn. The admirals are surprised by the Enterprise's presence but invite Captain Picard and Commander Riker to dinner.

After witnessing the admirals' bizarre behavior and discussion of a "superior life form" Dr. Crusher discovers that a bug-like parasite has wrapped its tendrils around the stem of Quinn's brain and is controlling him. At dinner, it is revealed that the parasites are seeking to take over Starfleet, using humanoids as hosts. Riker and Picard subdue the infected men, causing parasites to leave the hosts and flee. One of the parasites scurries under a closed door, where Picard and Riker find Quinn's assistant Remmick eating the parasite. Remmick begins transmitting a signal. Picard and Riker fire upon Remmick, destroying his body but freeing a giant parasite; the two continue to fire until it is destroyed. Dr. Crusher reports that the other parasites have shriveled up and died, as they were unable to survive without the mother-creature that had been inhabiting Remmick. Data theorizes that Remmick's signal was a homing beacon to more creatures like itself.

== Production ==
Gene Roddenberry originated the idea for the episode in a single-sentence proposal entitled "The Assassins". Robert Sabaroff expanded this idea to thirty pages but his version was seen as too expensive. Tracy Tormé was then given the job of rewriting it but some producers thought the new version was too dark until Roddenberry saw it and endorsed the new version. In one of the original versions, it was a faction within Starfleet who were conspirators rather than alien parasites but Roddenberry did not like showing Starfleet itself in such a dark manner. Wired suggested that the premise was based on the Iran–Contra affair. The episode's cliffhanger ending was meant to lead to the introduction of The Borg – initially conceptualized as an insectoid species – in the second season, a plot element foreshadowed in the following episode, "The Neutral Zone". Once the Borg were reimagined as a cybernetic race, this element was dropped, and the story element of the parasites' signal never resolved.

The director of the episode, Cliff Bole, was a school friend of makeup supervisor Michael Westmore. The scene with Remmick at the end of the episode was added in post-production, as it was originally scripted to have Riker and Picard come face to face with a full-sized mother creature. The part where the parasite enters Remmick's throat reportedly took many takes because the bulging effect was made by Westmore blowing into bladder under a false neck and Bole kept trying to make Westmore hyperventilate from the exertion. The parasites were created by Makeup & Effects Laboratories from a design by Rick Sternbach. A mold of Paul Newman's face was filled with raw meat and then blown up to create the effect used when Picard and Riker fire on Remmick but Rick Berman and Peter Lauritson were concerned that it was too graphic. Dan Curry invited his six-year-old son to watch the episode in order to test how children would react to it; the boy reportedly liked it so much that he suggested the creation of a Remmick action figure whose head would blow up by pressing a button. This resulted in Berman deciding to air the episode uncut with the full sequence included.

Several props and effects seen in the episode were reproduced from the Star Trek movies, including the shots of Earth and Spacedock One and the painting used of Starfleet Command. The doors to the room where dinner is served were reused from season 2 on the set for Ten-Forward. The episode also features two first appearances; the Ambassador class starship was mentioned for the first time (the Horatio was a member of this class, as was the Enterprise-C) and it also marks the first time that a Bolian had been seen on Star Trek, the species having been named after the episode's director. Although the parasites never re-appeared in a Star Trek series, they are found in the Deep Space Nine relaunch novels, where they are revealed to be mutated Trill symbionts. They also reappear in several episodes of the game Star Trek Online. The parasites, known as Bluegill, are bio-engineered by the Solanae on behalf of the Iconians. They are not capable of infecting a joined Trill.

== Reception ==
"Conspiracy" aired in broadcast syndication within the United States during the week commencing May 13, 1988. It received Nielsen ratings of 9.4, reflecting the percentage of all households watching the episode during its timeslot. This was a decrease of 0.3 ratings points from the previous episode, "We'll Always Have Paris" and was less than the 10.2 rating received by the following episode, "The Neutral Zone". Due to the nature of the content, a warning was aired before "Conspiracy" was screened in Canada. It was initially banned by the BBC in the United Kingdom, but was later aired on BBC Two in a bowdlerised form. The episode was nominated with "Coming of Age" for Best Makeup at the 40th Primetime Emmy Awards, winning the award, one of three Emmys won by the show that year.

Several reviewers re-watched Star Trek: The Next Generation after the end of the series. Keith DeCandido for Tor.com described the episode as "a nasty episode that doesn't quite cohere into the level of nasty it could" but that the series "doesn't do horror/action all that often, and it serves as a good change of pace if nothing else". He gave "Conspiracy" a score of four out of ten. Zack Handlen of The A.V. Club, thought that while "Conspiracy" was a "hard episode to forget", it was not quite as good as he remembered and did not quite "fit" with the rest of the season. He thought that certain parts of the plot were "idiotic" and the admirals reminded him of a "Bond villain convention". He gave the episode an overall grade of B, writing, "fingers crossed that next time we encounter a danger this sinister, the writers know how to handle it".

Robin Roberts was unimpressed with the episode including elements she considered misogynistic and reminiscent of dated elements of pulp science fiction. She noted that the villainous mother alien is explicitly described as female in the episode, and wrote that it seems to embody female stereotypes of cooperation and an undifferentiated collective self gone too far. Meanwhile, the parasite is opposed largely by human males representing masculine individuality, and her targets and victims too are males. Roberts grants that the episode does give a certain respect to the threat: while it may be evil, the mother alien is also powerful, and thus a legitimate threat to the male-dominated hierarchy of Starfleet admirals depicted in the episode.

"Conspiracy" was included as an honorable mention in a list of the best episodes of Star Trek: The Next Generation by Mike Antonucci of the San Jose Mercury News. It was also included in a list of the best and worst episodes by Scott Thill at Wired magazine as one of the best, describing the reactions to the episode as "polarizing" and suggesting that "Conspiracy" might be worthy of becoming a plot in a future film by J. J. Abrams. Total Film also suggested the episode as a potential plot for the film that would become Star Trek Into Darkness, and described it as "easily one of the greatest episodes of Star Trek: The Next Generation". In 2012, David Brown of Radio Times called "Conspiracy" "a definite high point" in the first season and included it on a list of The Next Generation's greatest moments.

== Home media release ==
The episode was released on VHS cassette in the U.S. on May 26, 1993. The episode was later included on the Star Trek: The Next Generation season one DVD box set, released in March 2002. "Conspiracy" was released as part of the season one Blu-ray set on July 24, 2012.
