= Rod Loomis =

American actor

Rod Loomis (born April 21, 1942, in St. Albans, Vermont) is an American actor. Loomis is best known for his role in Bill & Ted's Excellent Adventure as Sigmund Freud.

He was also in the 1973 Off-Broadway revival of You Never Know and the 1995 tour of Jekyll & Hyde as Sir Danvers Carew.

== Filmography ==
Year	Title	Role	Notes
1981	General Hospital	Gen. Konrad Kaluga	Recurring role
1982	The Beastmaster	Zed	
1984	Body Double	TV Director	
1985	Dynasty	Corridor Commando	Episode: The Aftermath
1988	Star Trek: The Next Generation	Dr. Paul Manheim	Episode: We'll Always Have Paris
1988	Jack's Back	Dr. Sidney Tannerson	
1989	Bill & Ted's Excellent Adventure	Freud	
1991-1992	The Bold and the Beautiful	Adam Banks	Recurring role
1993	Quantum Leap	Boris, the Butler	Episode: Blood Moon - March 10, 1975
2006	Stargate SG-1	Osric	Episode: The Quest: Part 1
