= Tasha Yar =

Character on Star Trek: The Next Generation

Natasha Yar
- Star Trek: The Next Generation character
- Season one promotional photo
- First appearance: "Encounter at Farpoint"; September 28, 1987
- Last appearance: "All Good Things..."; May 23, 1994
- Created by: Gene Roddenberry; D. C. Fontana
- Portrayed by: Denise Crosby

In-universe information
- Affiliation: Federation; Starfleet
- Posting: USS Enterprise-D
- Position: Chief Security Officer

Natasha "Tasha" Yar is a character that mainly appeared in the first season of the American science fiction television series Star Trek: The Next Generation. Portrayed by Denise Crosby, Yar is chief of security aboard the Starfleet starship USS Enterprise-D and carries the rank of lieutenant.

The character first appeared in the series' pilot episode, "Encounter at Farpoint". After Crosby decided to leave the series, Yar was killed in the episode "Skin of Evil" near the end of the series' first season. She has a guest appearance in the third season episode "Yesterday's Enterprise", in which her character was still alive in an alternate timeline, and again in the final episode of the series "All Good Things...", which included events set prior to the pilot.

Yar was described as a forerunner to other strong women in science fiction, such as Kara Thrace from the 2004 version of Battlestar Galactica, while providing an intermediary step between the depictions of female characters on The Original Series to the command positions they have on Star Trek: Deep Space Nine and Voyager. Some fans have speculated on the sexuality of her character, and that the events in the episode "The Naked Now" were designed to establish her heterosexuality given an otherwise ambiguous portrayal.

== Concept and development ==
The original December 1986 casting call for actors described early versions of the crew. It included a character named "Macha Hernandez" inspired by Vasquez in Aliens who was the security chief of the Enterprise. A version from February 1987 gave her the position of tactical officer to make it so that she would have a reason to be on the bridge. The producers considered Jenette Goldstein, who had played Vasquez, for the role, but writer Dorothy Fontana pointed out that the actress "is not Latina. She is petite, blue-eyed, freckle-faced". The character was briefly renamed "Tanya" in March 1987 as a result.

By the time that the writers' and directors' guide for the series was published, dated March 23, 1987, the character's name had become Natasha "Tasha" Yar. The guide described her character as such:

The starship Security Chief, Tasha, who performs that same function both aboard ship and on away missions. Born at a "failed" Earth colony of renegades and other violent undesirables, she escaped to Earth in her teens and discovered Starfleet, which she still "worships" today as the complete opposite of all the ugliness she once knew.

Her surname was suggested by Robert Lewin, drawing inspiration from the Babi Yar atrocities in Ukraine during the World War II. Her biography stated that she was 28 years old, and confirmed her Ukrainian descent. She was planned to have a friendship with teenager Wesley Crusher, and was described in the guide as "treat[ing] this boy like the most wonderful person imaginable. Wes is the childhood friend that Tasha never had."

In April 1987, Lianne Langland, Julia Nickson, Rosalind Chao, Leah Ayres, and Bunty Bailey were each listed as being in contention for the role; Chao was a favorite candidate. Denise Crosby was described as "the only possibility" for the character of Deanna Troi. The production staff were not keen on having two actresses in the bridge crew roles with similar physical types and hair colors, and so the team took account of the casting of the two roles together. The writers and directors guide described Yar as having a muscular but very feminine body type, and being sufficiently athletic to defeat most other crew members in martial arts. After Crosby and Marina Sirtis had each auditioned for Troi and Yar respectively, Gene Roddenberry decided to switch the actresses and cast Crosby as Tasha Yar. He felt that Sirtis' appearance was better suited to the "exotic" Troi.

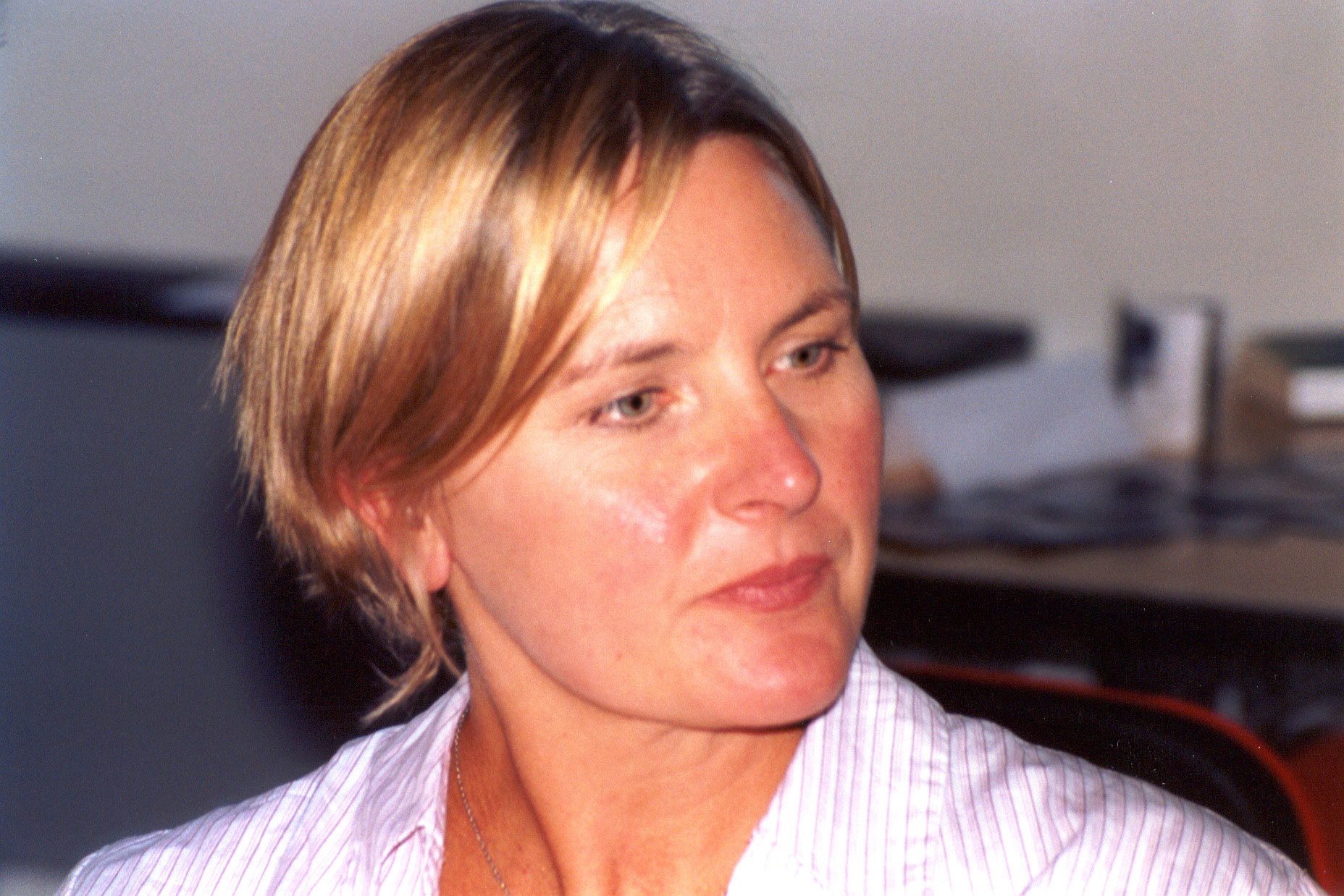
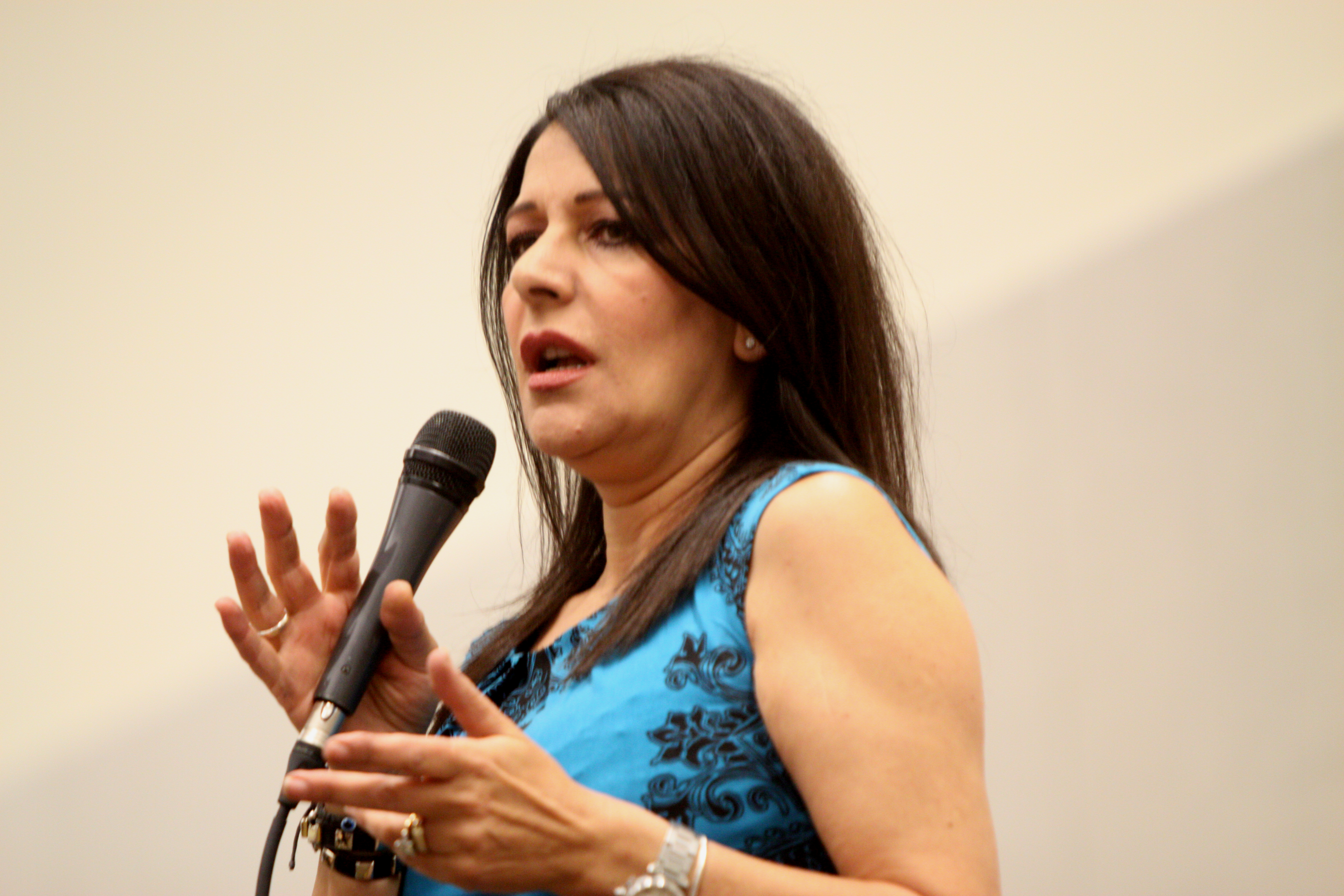
Gene Roddenberry switched the roles that Denise Crosby (left) and Marina Sirtis (right) interviewed for, as he felt that Sirtis was better suited to be Deanna Troi.

Before the end of the first season, Crosby asked to be released from her contract as she was unhappy that her character was not being developed. She later said "I was miserable. I couldn't wait to get off that show. I was dying". Roddenberry agreed to her request and she left on good terms. The final episode she filmed was "Symbiosis", which was completed after Yar's death in "Skin of Evil". Her last scene was during the final act of the episode, in which a holographic farewell recording of her is played for the bridge crew. After her departure, archive footage of Crosby as Yar was used in the episodes "The Schizoid Man" and "Shades of Gray". In a later retrospective, Crosby noted that the producers loved the character of Tasha Yar, despite the scripts of the first season failing to do much with the character. She speculated that her departure (and the departure of Gates McFadden) might have saved Marina Sirtis's then-tenuous position, as the producers had to avoid a situation where all three of the lead female actresses of season 1 were dismissed in season 2.

Crosby was happy to return in "Yesterday's Enterprise" due to the strength of the script, saying that "I had more to do in that episode than I'd ever had to do before". Prior to the episode being aired, the media had to be reassured that Yar was not returning in a dream sequence. Crosby later said that she was impressed with the changes wrought by Michael Piller as showrunner in the third season. Following her appearance in that episode, Crosby pitched the idea of Yar's daughter, Sela, to the producers. She made her first appearance in this role in the two-part "Redemption" and appeared once more in another two-part episode, "Unification". Denise returned twice more in the non-canon Star Trek universe. In 2007, she appeared as an ancestor of Tasha Yar, Jenna Yar, in "Blood and Fire", an episode of the fan-produced series Star Trek: New Voyages. Tasha Yar was written into Star Trek Online as part of the third anniversary celebration in 2013. Denise Crosby recorded audio for the game, in scenes set after those in "Yesterday's Enterprise".

== Appearances ==
Natasha Yar's origins are explained in the season four episode "Legacy". She was born on the planet Turkana IV in 2337. She had a younger sister named Ishara, who was born five years after her. Shortly after Ishara's birth, the girls' parents were killed and they were taken in by other people; however, they were subsequently abandoned and Tasha was required to look after her sister on her own. The government on the planet had collapsed, and the sisters were forced to scavenge for food while avoiding rape gangs. In 2352, aged 15, Tasha managed to leave Turkana IV. She never saw Ishara again; the latter joined the "Coalition", one of the factions on the planet before Tasha left. Tasha refused to join the cadres on the planet, blaming them for her parents' deaths.

Yar appeared for the first time in the pilot episode of Star Trek: The Next Generation as the Security and Tactical Officer on board the USS Enterprise-D. When Captain Picard orders an emergency saucer separation, Yar is one of the bridge crew to accompany him to the battle bridge. She is amongst the crew abducted by Q, and later serves on the away team to Farpoint Station. In both that episode and "Hide and Q", she is outspoken and the most openly defiant of Q of the cast, although her defiance is ineffective both times. In "The Naked Now", while the crew are under the influence of an alien ailment, she initiates a sexual encounter with the android Data. In "Code of Honor" Yar is abducted by Lutan, the leader of the planet Ligon II, after she demonstrates her combat skills on the holodeck. She kills Lutan's wife Yareena in ritual combat to the death, though Yareena is revived on the Enterprise by Doctor Crusher. During the events of "Where No One Has Gone Before", Yar begins to hallucinate that she is back on Turkana IV and running for her life. In "The Arsenal of Freedom", Yar and Data are trapped together on the surface of the planet Minos and are attacked by a series of sentry probes that adapt to Data and Yar's phasers. The situation is resolved by Captain Picard, who is trapped elsewhere on the planet's surface with Dr. Crusher.

In "Skin of Evil", Yar forms part of the away team that beams down to Vagra II to rescue Deanna Troi from a crashed shuttlecraft. She is killed by the creature Armus in a display of his power. The crew hold a memorial service for her on the holodeck, and Worf replaces her as chief tactical and security officer.

Yar's legacy has a minor role in "The Measure of a Man", a second season episode. Despite Data's lack of emotions, he is sentimentally attached to her, and keeps a small hologram of her in his quarters. During the court hearing on Data's stature as a sentient being, he says that he and Yar were intimate and that she was special to him.

The USS Enterprise-C emerges from a rift in space-time in "Yesterday's Enterprise", and the timeline is changed. Yar is once again alive and in her former position on the Enterprise-D. She works with the older Enterprise's helmsman, Richard Castillo, and the two become close. Guinan, who has some awareness of the timeline that would be restored by the Enterprise-C returning into the rift, confides in Yar that she believes that Yar died senselessly in that timeline. Based on that advice, Yar transfers to the Enterprise-C and returns with it to two decades into the past, and its expected destruction at the hands of the Romulans while defending the Klingon outpost Narendra III. The alternative universe version of Yar traveled back in time on board the Enterprise-C, and into the main timeline. This process was later described as "world jumping" rather than a typical timeline travel story by critics.

In the two-part episode "Redemption", Denise Crosby plays Sela, Yar's half-Romulan daughter. In a follow-up to "Yesterday's Enterprise", it is revealed that several members of the Enterprise-C crew were captured by the Romulans when it returned through the rift, including Yar. A Romulan general offered to spare the crew's lives if she became his consort. After a year, Yar gave birth to Sela. When Sela was four, Yar attempted to escape but Sela screamed to prevent her from being taken away from her father. After she was caught, Yar was executed.

The series finale "All Good Things..." includes Yar's final appearance, in scenes that take place prior to and in the early parts of "Encounter at Farpoint". As most of the bridge crew are yet to join the Enterprise-D in the scenes, Yar is one of the senior members of the crew under Captain Picard in the earliest of the three timeframes in the episode. She needs to be convinced by Picard to put the ship in danger in order to destroy the temporal anti-time anomaly that threatens to prevent life from evolving on Earth.

== Reception and commentary ==
The loss of Yar is unfortunate. While it's true the character as portrayed didn't live up to the character as envisioned—Yar was the most interesting person in the TNG bible—that's also true of a lot of characters. Denise Crosby has never been the best actor in the universe, but Michael Dorn, Jonathan Frakes, and Marina Sirtis weren't any great shakes in the first season, either, and their characters didn't blow the doors off. They got better with time, and there's every reason to believe the same would've been true for Crosby had she remained.

— Keith DeCandido, July 25, 2011

Science fiction writer Keith DeCandido considered Yar the most interesting role in the "TNG writer's bible" used during the creation of the first season's scripts, despite missteps in fulfilling this potential. Peter W. Lee likewise admired the original "Macha Hernandez" role from the drafts and the elements that stretched into the final version of Yar: a character whose backstory was informed by failures of the Federation, but who rose above them. Lee also felt that these themes were related to then-resonant issues from the Reagan era of the 1980s. In particular, Yar provided a good counterbalance to the rest of the cast: she differed from the characters with utopian yet sheltered backgrounds, most starkly Wesley Crusher. However, Lee thought skepticism of career-oriented feminism in the 1980s resulted in contradictory depictions of her character. He thought it was unfortunate that the character never had a chance to develop.

Critics were initially positive about the potential of her character as the first season debuted. A Post-Tribune review of the series following the pilot described Yar as a "tough cookie" and the reviewer's favorite crew member, while the Los Angeles Times called Crosby an especially good case of casting against type.

Frank Oglesbee, in an article on Deep Space Nine's Kira Nerys, outlined the progression of female roles in "gender assumptions" from The Original Series where women were on the bridge, through Tasha Yar in The Next Generation where they were in command positions, to Deep Space Nine and Voyager where women were in lead roles. He noted specifically that women appeared in command positions more regularly as main and supporting characters, and were portrayed as more assertive and combative, with leading roles in action sequences. A Den of Geek article by Martin Anderson about women in Star Trek described the character as a predecessor to Kara "Starbuck" Thrace in the 2004 Battlestar Galactica series.

Fans and media critics have speculated about the character's sexuality. The series is largely silent about her sexuality, providing a space for interpretation that some fans have used to suggest she might be lesbian or bisexual. Henry Jenkins wrote that "For these fans, the text's silences about character's sexuality or motives can be filled with homosexual desire, since, after all, in our society, such desire must often go unspoken." Jenkins described Yar as "an obvious bisexual". Curve magazine speculated that Yar was a "closeted" lesbian. The main exception to the usual silence on Yar's sexuality is the episode "The Naked Now", where Yar pairs off with Data while both are under the influence of a mysterious uninhibiting malady. Jenkins disliked the implications of the episode, and wrote that "when they [the writers] decided to straighten her, they used an android. So we ended up heterosexualizing two perfectly wonderful characters". The authors of the book Deep Space and Sacred Time: Star Trek in the American Mythos thought that having Data and Yar consummate sexually was a means to state early on in the series the heterosexuality of the two most androgynous characters in the show. Regardless of sexuality, Yar is portrayed as on the masculine tomboyish side, with short cropped hair leading to a "somewhat butch" appearance. Yar seeking out Troi's seductive and flimsy dresses in "The Naked Now" is correctly taken by Troi as a sign that Yar is ill.

Fans responded negatively to the death of Yar as they felt that the character had potential for future expansion. Many reviewers were critical of the manner of her death. Keith DeCandido called it "pointless", but also thought that it was no worse than the deaths of other security officer "redshirts" throughout the history of Star Trek. He said that he preferred her death in "Skin of Evil" to the "clichéd-up-the-wazoo" death she experienced in "Yesterday's Enterprise". Gary Westfahl, in his book Space and Beyond: The Frontier Theme in Science Fiction, described Yar's death as one of the most notable ones in Star Trek, alongside that of Spock in Star Trek II: The Wrath of Khan and James T. Kirk in Star Trek Generations. SFX magazine included her first death in a 2012 list of "Naff Sci-Fi Deaths", writing that while the intended idea that "mundane" deaths happen was fair, the overall effect was still "a bit crap". And while some critics thought her fate in that episode was cliche (such as DeCandido), many others liked "Yesterday's Enterprise" and considered it a classic episode, and praised it giving a chance for Yar to die heroically rather than meaninglessly.

== See also ==
- List of Star Trek: The Next Generation characters
