= Encounter at Farpoint =

- Star Trek: The Next Generation episodes
- Episode nos.: Season 1 Episodes 1 and 2
- Directed by: Corey Allen
- Written by: D. C. Fontana; Gene Roddenberry
- Cinematography by: Edward R. Brown
- Original air date: September 28, 1987
- Running time: 1 hour 32 minutes

Guest appearances
- John de Lancie as Q; Michael Bell as Groppler Zorn; DeForest Kelley as Adm. Leonard McCoy; Colm Meaney as Conn Ensign; Cary-Hiroyuki Tagawa as Mandarin Bailiff; Tim Dang as Main Bridge Security; David Erskine as Bandi shopkeeper; Evelyn Guerrero as Female computer ensign; Chuck Hicks as Drugged military officer; Jimmy Ortega as Lt. Torres

Episode chronology
| ← Previous — | Next → "The Naked Now" |
- Star Trek: The Next Generation season 1

"Encounter at Farpoint" is the pilot episode and series premiere of the American science fiction television series Star Trek: The Next Generation, which premiered in syndication on September 28, 1987. It was written by D. C. Fontana and Gene Roddenberry and directed by Corey Allen. Roddenberry was the creator of Star Trek, and Fontana was a writer on the original series. It was originally aired as a two-hour (with commercials) TV movie, and subsequent reruns typically split the episode into two parts.

Set in the 24th century (2360s to 2370s), the series follows the adventures of the Starfleet crew of the Federation starship Enterprise-D. In this episode, the crew of the newly built Enterprise examine the mysterious Farpoint Station which the Bandi people are offering to the Federation, while under the scrutiny of a powerful godlike entity that calls itself "Q" (John de Lancie).

The episode was made as a pilot for the new Star Trek series, and was a double length episode at Paramount Television Group's insistence. After the show was initially announced on October 10, 1986, Roddenberry put together a production team which included staff members from the original series such as Robert H. Justman. The show used some existing sets and props from the Star Trek films and both Star Trek: The Original Series and Star Trek: Phase II. New actors were hired for the pilot, which in some cases required the character concepts to be redeveloped to better fit the actor. Marina Sirtis and Denise Crosby were hired for the roles of Macha Hernandez and Deanna Troi respectively, but were later switched by Roddenberry and Crosby's new role renamed to Tasha Yar.

DeForest Kelley agreed to appear in a cameo role in the pilot, but—as a gesture to Roddenberry—refused to be paid more than the minimum possible salary. The show made its debut in syndication to a mixed critical response, an assessment which was upheld by critics reassessing the episode following the end of the entire series. It also marked the first appearance of the emergency saucer separation maneuver and the only time where the saucer reconnection sequence appears on-screen.

== Plot ==
In 2364, the new flagship of the United Federation of Planets, Starfleet's USS Enterprise, travels to the planet Deneb IV for its maiden voyage. Enterprise is to open relations with the simple Bandi people, who have somehow been able to tap immense energy reserves and construct Farpoint Station, much to the surprise of the Federation. En route, the Enterprise is met by an omnipotent being who identifies himself as Q, a member of the Q Continuum who declares that humanity is being put on trial for savagery, and decides that the Enterprise crew's actions in their upcoming mission will be used to judge humanity's worth and determine their fate as a race. Before letting the ship resume its course, Q warns Captain Picard (Patrick Stewart) that he is destined to fail.

As the Enterprise arrives, the crew members explore the offerings of Farpoint Station and establish relations with their Bandi host, Groppler Zorn (Michael Bell). The crew becomes suspicious when items they desire seem to appear out of nowhere moments later, and are unable to identify the power source that feeds the station. Deanna Troi (Marina Sirtis), an empath, senses a being with powerful yet despairing emotions nearby, and the crew discover a strange labyrinth beneath the station, but Zorn does not offer an explanation. As the Enterprise crew continues its explorations, a large unknown alien craft enters orbit, begins to fire upon an older Bandi settlement near Farpoint Station, and abducts Zorn. Before Picard orders the ship's phasers to be fired at the craft, Q appears to remind him of humanity's trial and prompts Picard to send an away team to the alien craft.

The away team discovers the craft has passages similar to those under Farpoint and they are able to free Zorn. Their actions cause the alien craft to transform into a jellyfish-like space creature, and Picard is able to deduce the mystery of Farpoint Station. He confirms with the apologetic Zorn that the Bandi found a similar lifeform injured on their planet and, while attempting to care for it, they also exploited its ability to synthesize matter to create Farpoint Station. The creature now in orbit is trying to help free its mate by attacking those who hold it captive.

Though Q goads Picard into punishing the Bandi, Picard refuses, instead ordering the Enterprise to fire a vivifying energy beam onto Farpoint after the station is evacuated. The beam allows the land-bound creature to transform back into its jellyfish-like form, and it flies into orbit to join its fellow being. As the crew watches the reunion of the alien creatures, Q reluctantly tells Picard that the humans have succeeded in their test, but hints that they will meet again.

== Production ==
=== Conception and development history ===
The new Star Trek series was announced on October 10, 1986, by the head of Paramount Television Group, Mel Harris. He announced that the creator of Star Trek, Gene Roddenberry, was to be executive producer and lead the creation of the new series. It was the second attempt at creating a new live-action television series based on Star Trek for Paramount; production on the previous attempt in 1977, called Star Trek: Phase II, became Star Trek: The Motion Picture. When the decision was made not to proceed with the Paramount network it had been slated to be the flagship for, and interest in a new movie was piqued after the release of Star Wars. Paramount had pitched ideas to Roddenberry earlier in 1986 as it was the twentieth anniversary of the original series, but Roddenberry turned them down and initially didn't want to do a new series. He later said, "It was only when the Paramount people agreed with me and said a sequel was probably impossible anyway that my interest was piqued."

All four major networks turned down the new Star Trek series, as they were not willing to commit to a twenty-six-hour first season with a guaranteed unchanging time slot as well as a promotional campaign for the show. The team proceeded with the project with the backing of Paramount. Roddenberry began putting together a production crew which included colleagues who had worked with him on the original series, including Robert H. Justman, David Gerrold, and Eddie Milkis. Justman proposed three ideas to the others on October 17, including families on board the ship, a concept which later became the holodeck and both an android and a Klingon character. One idea discussed by the production team was for Deanna Troi to have three breasts to which writer D. C. Fontana objected.

Fontana, who had previously worked on a number of episodes of the original series, was tasked with writing the script for the pilot. The production team met in full for the first time on February 18, 1987, having received the first draft of Fontana's script a few days earlier. The original premise involved the Enterprise and the USS Starseeker approaching an alien lifeform captured by a race called the Annoi and turned into a weapon. After the Annoi told the Starfleet ships to surrender, the Starseeker opened fire and was destroyed, while Troi contacted the alien and convinced it to crash on a nearby planet so that the Enterprise can help it to free itself along with rescuing other prisoners the Annoi were using as slaves on the surface. Despite numerous changes taking place to the plot before the final version, some of the introductions for various characters made it through to the final version. The plot involving Q was added subsequently to the episode in order to make it longer. Roddenberry was aiming for an hour-long pilot, but Paramount wanted a two-hour show and eventually won out. Other items were also added in order to lengthen the episode, including the saucer separation sequence and the appearance of Admiral Leonard McCoy.

=== Casting ===
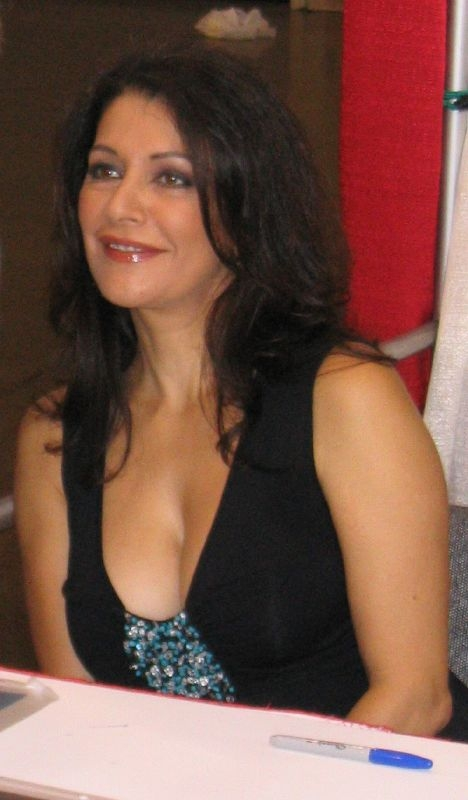
English actress Marina Sirtis originally gained the role of Security Chief Macha Hernandez

Roddenberry realized early on that a series with the original crew from Star Trek was unlikely to be practical, nor did he want to recast the roles or have a "retread" crew – a series of different characters in very similar roles to the original series. He explained "I would hate to think our imagination is so slender that there aren't other possibilities to think about." The first casting call was sent out on December 10, 1986. While some characters such as Geordi La Forge and Beverly Crusher remain recognizable from their descriptions in the initial casting call, others have clear differences; "Julien Picard" would lapse into a French accent when he became emotional, and Data was non-Caucasian. Macha Hernandez was a Latino security chief based on Jenette Goldstein's role in Aliens, while Deanna Troi was to appear "foreign" or more specifically of an Icelandic or Scandinavian nature. Leslie Crusher was listed as a fifteen-year-old girl with a photographic memory, although was quickly changed to a male teenager called Wesley. Justman argued for a female teenager but Roddenberry thought that there would be a greater number of storylines available if the character was male.

Patrick Stewart was cast in the role of Jean-Luc Picard after Justman saw him perform at the University of California, Los Angeles. Roddenberry insisted that he wanted a French actor in the role, but Justman arranged a meeting between Stewart and the production team to introduce the actor, and later Rick Berman supported the casting. Fontana thought that American actor Stephen Macht would be better in the role. Justman wanted Stewart in the show in some capacity, and with Roddenberry still opposing him as Picard, Justman suggested that he might be a good fit instead for Data. Because Roddenberry couldn't find an actor he preferred more for Picard, he relented and changed his concept of Picard to better fit Stewart. Although Stewart was willing to put on an American accent to portray the role of Picard, the producers asked him to use his natural accent instead. They also tested him with a hairpiece but thought that it looked "awful". Stewart was pleased to have received the role, saying that his children were impressed with the new part and praised the mythos of the show by saying "The great strength of Star Trek is its epic, classic feel. For an actor of my background, it has more richness and depth than you might expect on television."

Roddenberry's favorite for Riker was Jonathan Frakes, who went through seven auditions before claiming the role. Despite being the second choice of the casting team, he was hired after their first choice was unimpressive in his auditions. LeVar Burton had worked with Justman on another pilot for a series called Emergency Room and was suggested to apply for the role of La Forge. For US audiences, he was the most well-known actor in the cast, due to his role in Roots. Gates McFadden and Brent Spiner gained the parts of Beverly Crusher and Data respectively through the normal audition processes. Eric Menyuk had also been considered for the part of Data, and would later be cast as the recurring character of the Traveller in three subsequent episodes. Justman later said that he was the only one out of the production team who preferred Menyuk in the role. Marina Sirtis auditioned for the role of Macha Hernandez, while Denise Crosby auditioned for the part of Deanna Troi. They both gained the parts with the approval of Berman and Justman, but Roddenberry switched the roles of the actresses as he thought Sirtis would be better suited for the role of the ship's counselor. Macha Hernandez was re-written to become Tasha Yar to better suit Crosby.

The role of Worf required a black actor in order to make the Klingon make up easier to apply, and was expected to be only a recurring character, but following the casting of Michael Dorn and his work in "Encounter at Farpoint", the role was expanded. Wil Wheaton was cast as Wesley Crusher despite what he perceived as an "awful" first callback. J. D. Roth was also considered for the role. The cast was announced on May 15, 1987. There was a certain degree of uncertainty regarding job security during the pilot for the main cast, as they did not hear until after production had wrapped that the show had been picked up for a further thirteen episodes.

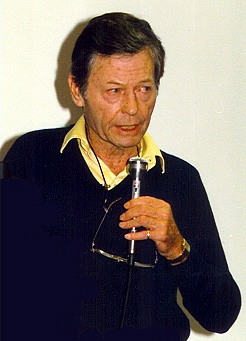
DeForest Kelley, who played Leonard McCoy in the original series, reprised his role in a cameo in this episode.

The appearance of DeForest Kelley as Leonard McCoy was kept a secret, with the character only being referred to in scripts as "Admiral". While Roddenberry had wanted Kelley to appear, he thought that the actor would turn him down. The two had lunch together and Roddenberry suggested the appearance, with Kelley agreeing not only to appear, but also that he would not take anything more than the Screen Actor's Guild base salary for the part. He later said "I just wanted scale, to let it be my way of saying thank you to Gene for the many good things he has done for me". John de Lancie deliberately missed his first audition for Q as he was appearing as a lead in a play at the time. A second audition was arranged during lunchtime so that he could attend. He later said that after he auditioned "a big guy walked out, put his hands on my shoulder, and said, 'You make my words sound better than they are.' I said, 'Well, you must be the writer.' And he said, 'I'm Gene Roddenberry.' I had absolutely no idea who that was." Colm Meaney was cast in the part of the conn ensign on the ship's battle bridge, and after a further appearance in the episode "Lonely Among Us", his character was given the name Miles O'Brien in season two.

=== Filming ===
Due to what was seen as a low budget for the pilot and series in general, the existing sets and equipment from the Star Trek movies were re-used in the new show. Milkis and Justman were given the task of reviewing the standing sets from the movies on the Paramount lot in order to see what they could use. The duo would later recall that one stage was so completely covered with cat feces due to the number of cats living on the lot that the pair couldn't walk on the set. Certain sets were re-used, including a re-dress of the Enterprise's bridge from Star Trek III: The Search for Spock to act as the Enterprise's battle bridge in the new series. The main engineering set from Star Trek III became the new main engineering set, albeit with a command console from Star Trek IV added as well as two walls from sickbay from Star Trek III. The rest of the sickbay set became the observation lounge during the first season. Some of the sets contained components from both Star Trek: The Motion Picture and the unfilmed Star Trek: Phase II.

After running tests with a company for computer-generated special effects, it was decided that, for the sake of reliability, Industrial Light & Magic would produce the new models of the Enterprise, at a cost of $75,000 for a 6 feet (1.8 m) and a 2 feet (0.61 m) version. ILM was also integral to the development of the "jump to warp" special effect, which resulted in the company remaining on the show's end credits through its entire run. Filming of "Encounter at Farpoint" began on the Paramount lot May 29, 1987, and wrapped on June 25. Wil Wheaton noted that during the filming of "Encounter at Farpoint", most of the cast believed that the series would not last more than a year.

== Broadcast and streaming ==
"Encounter at Farpoint" first aired as a single two-hour-long movie (including commercials) in broadcast syndication starting the week of September 28, 1987. The production code for the 2 hour movie is 721, whereas it was also presented as two television episodes with production numbers 101 and 102.

The show was broadcast on both 98 independent stations and 112 network affiliates. In several locations, including Dallas, Los Angeles, Seattle and Miami, the stations which were broadcasting "Encounter at Farpoint" gained higher ratings than the four major networks during prime time. Overall, it aired to an audience of 27 million. The show was immediately called the "highest-rated syndicated one-hour drama series on television".

On the launch of Paramount+ streaming service, on March 4, 2021, a free Star Trek marathon was presented, featuring the pilots of the various Star Trek television series, including "Encounter at Farpoint". The marathon started at 7 am PT/10 am ET and was livestreamed on the YouTube internet video platform on that day.

== Reception ==
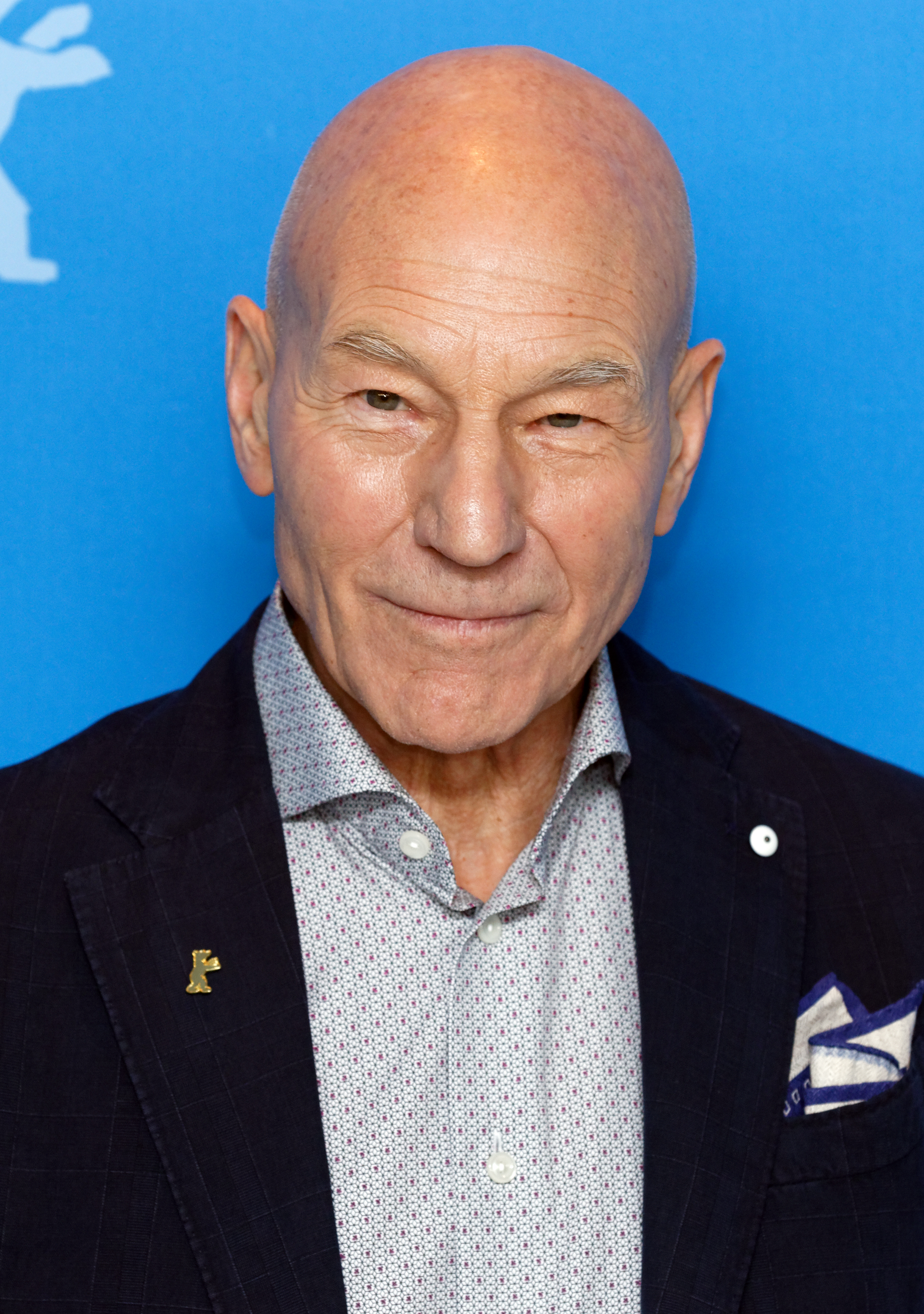
One critic described Patrick Stewart as a "damn fine actor", while another thought he was a "grim bald crank".

Jill L. Lanford watched the episode for The Herald Journal, prior to the series premiere. She thought it was a resurrection of a "legend". She believed the episode itself was reminiscent of classic Star Trek episodes "Arena" and "The Squire of Gothos", was the "perfect vehicle to introduce the crew", and a "perfect start". Don Merrill, writing for TV Guide said that the show was a "worthy successor to the original". Bob Niedt reviewed "Encounter at Farpoint" for Newhouse News and thought that the show had potential on the back of the episode, but there were problems such as "spots where the dialogue is pedestrian and interactions sputter". Tom Shales of The Washington Post viewed DeForest Kelley's cameo as "touching", but thought that Patrick Stewart was a "grim bald crank who would make a better villain". He felt Jonathan Frakes "verges on namby-pamby". Actress Marina Sirtis later recalled the reviews of the show's debut in 1987, saying "they bloody hated us".

Several reviewers reassessed the episode some time after the series aired. Michelle Erica Green reviewed the episode for TrekNation, and found the episode disappointing with reference to the character of Captain Picard and the female crew members and a lack of sense of fun. Actor Wil Wheaton, also reviewing the episode years later for TV Squad, gave the episode a 'C−' grade, suggesting that "at the time, Trekkies who were hoping to see the Star Trek that they were used to from the sixties must have been disappointed". Zack Handlen at The A.V. Club, criticized some of the elements of the episode, such as the "long, rather pointless sequence" where the Enterprise undergoes a saucer separation and overall described the episode "more functional than inspiring". He praised the performance of Patrick Stewart as Captain Picard, describing him as a "damn fine actor" and enjoyed John de Lancie as Q. He gave the episode an overall score of B−. James Hunt, from Den of Geek, re-reviewed the show following the re-release of season one on Blu-ray Disc. He stated, "even if it wasn't the first episode, it'd be worth watching" despite it coming from "what could arguably be called the worst season of Star Trek". Keith DeCandido for Tor.com thought that the pace of the episode was slow, but that both Patrick Stewart and Brent Spiner stood out from the rest of the cast for good reasons. He enjoyed the references to the original series, especially DeForest Kelley's appearance. He gave it overall a score of four out of ten. The episode was one of a handful of Star Trek programs recommended for viewing to introduce new viewers to the mythos in Jon Wagnar and Jan Lundeen's 1998 book Deep Space and Sacred Time: Star Trek in the American Mythos.

The episode has been rated one of the series' best by The Hollywood Reporter and Den of Geek, and one of the most important Picard-focused episodes by SciFiPulse.net and Tom's Guide.

== Home media release ==
Star Trek: The Next Generation made its debut on VHS in September 1991 with "Encounter at Farpoint" as a feature-length episode on a single tape. It was released in VHS in the United Kingdom.

This episode was released in the "Q Continuum" collection of LaserDisc. The collection was released on July 30, 1997 and was published by Paramount Home Video; it retailed for 100 USD. The set included the 2-part "Encounter at Farpoint", "Hide and Q", "Q Who", and "Deja Q" on 12 inch optical discs in NTSC format with a total runtime of 230 minutes. The collection came in a Tri-Fold jacket that also included a letter from actor Jon De Lancie. "Encounter at Farpoint" was released in Japan on LaserDisc on June 10, 1995, as part of First Season Part.1. This included first season episodes up to "Datalore" with a total runtime of 638 minutes on 12-inch optical video discs. "Encounter at Farpoint" was released on PAL-format LaserDisc in the United Kingdom as part of The Pilots collection, in April 1996. This included the color version of "The Cage", "Where No Man Has Gone Before", "Encounter at Farpoint", "Emissary", and "Caretaker" with a total runtime of 379 minutes.

It was released on DVD on region one on March 26, 2002. The sound was remastered to Dolby Digital 5.1 Surround standards, and a series of interviews with the cast and crew were included on the sixth disc. "Encounter at Farpoint" was one of the first episodes of the series to be released on Blu-ray Disc. The episode was remastered into high-definition video and involved the original production team in updating some of the special effects in the episode. It was featured on the single disc sampler of the series which was launched prior to any full season box sets in early 2012, entitled Star Trek: The Next Generation – The Next Level along with two other episodes. "Encounter at Farpoint" was subsequently included in the Blu-ray Disc release of the season one box set.

== Novel ==
A novelization of this episode was published by Pocket Books, it was one of five novelizations to be made of The Next Generation episodes, alongside "Unification", "Descent", "Relics", and "All Good Things...". The novelization was credited to original Star Trek series writer David Gerrold, but according to Gerrold the manuscript was actually written by D.C. Fontana, who had the assignment taken away by Roddenberry following a dispute over writing credits for the original teleplay. Gerrold submitted Fontana's manuscript under his own name with Fontana's blessing (without informing Roddenberry or Paramount) and voluntarily gave all proceeds from its sales to Fontana.
