= The Bold and the Brave =

1956 film by Lewis R. Foster

- Film poster
- Directed by: Lewis R. Foster
- Written by: Robert Lewin
- Produced by: Hal E. Chester
- Starring: Wendell Corey; Mickey Rooney; Don Taylor; Nicole Maurey; John Smith; Race Gentry
- Cinematography: Samuel Leavitt, A.S.C.
- Edited by: Aaron Stell
- Music by: Herschel Burke Gilbert (composed and directed); Mickey Rooney; Ross Bagdasarian (title song)
- Production company: The Filmakers
- Distributed by: RKO Radio Pictures
- Release date: April 18, 1956 (US)
- Running time: 87 minutes
- Country: United States
- Language: English
- Box office: $1.4 million (US)

The Bold and the Brave is a 1956 American World War II film written by Robert Lewin in his first screenplay based on some of his Italian Campaign experiences. It was directed by Lewis R. Foster and stars Wendell Corey, Mickey Rooney, and Don Taylor. The film was produced by Filmmakers Production Organization and released by RKO. The title song was cowritten by Mickey Rooney and Ross Bagdasarian, the creator of Alvin and the Chipmunks.

== Plot ==
=== Text in opening credits ===
"ITALY 1944"
"The battle is big... but some things are even bigger... sometimes the battle inside a man makes the war seem small by comparison..."
"This battle began at the bivouac area with the fresh troops awaiting their baptism of fire..."

The film traces the destinies of three American soldiers stationed in Italy during World War II. Fairchild (Corey) is an idealist who doesn't believe in killing. Preacher (Taylor) is a religious zealot, who can't see anything in terms other than Good and Evil. Dooley (Rooney), an inveterate gambler who runs a floating crap game up and down the Italian front. A gambler and a World War II veteran himself, Rooney claimed to have adlibbed and directed his crap game sequence.

=== Text in closing credits ===
"Bravery is courage in action. It produces the deed which sets the hero above the coward."
"Omar N. Bradley, General of the Army."

== Cast ==
- Wendell Corey as Fairchild
- Mickey Rooney as Dooley
- Don Taylor as Preacher
- Nicole Maurey as Fiamma
- John Smith as Smith
- Race Gentry as Hendricks
- Ralph Votrian as Wilbur
- Wright King as Technician Fifth Grade
- Stanley Adams as Master Sergeant
- Bobs Watson as Bob
- Tara Summers as Tina

Uncredited

- Diana Darrin as Lina

== Accolades ==
Award	Category	Nominee(s)	Result	Ref.
Academy Awards	Best Actor in a Supporting Role	Mickey Rooney	Nominated	
Academy Awards	Best Screenplay – Original	Robert Lewin	Nominated	

== See also ==
- List of American films of 1956
