= Symbiosis (Star Trek: The Next Generation) =

- Star Trek: The Next Generation episode
- Episode no.: Season 1 Episode 22
- Directed by: Win Phelps
- Story by: Robert Lewin
- Teleplay by: Robert Lewin; Richard Manning; Hans Broker
- Cinematography by: Edward R. Brown
- Production code: 123
- Original air date: April 18, 1988

Guest appearances
- Judson Scott – Sobi; Merritt Butrick – T'Jon; Richard Lineback – Romas; Kimberly Farr – Langor

Episode chronology
← Previous "The Arsenal of Freedom"	Next → "Skin of Evil"
- Star Trek: The Next Generation season 1

"Symbiosis" is the twenty-second episode of the American science fiction television series Star Trek: The Next Generation. It first aired on April 18, 1988, in broadcast syndication. The teleplay was written by Robert Lewin, Richard Manning, and Hans Beimler, based on a story by Lewin, and the episode was directed by Win Phelps.

Set in the 24th century, the series follows the adventures of the Starfleet crew of the Federation starship Enterprise-D. In this episode, Picard tries to mediate a trade dispute between two neighboring planets, one of which is the sole supplier of a drug to treat the other's apparently fatal disease, only to discover a far more sinister relationship is involved that he cannot interfere with.

The episode was written after executive producer Maurice Hurley worked on Miami Vice, which he credited for resulting in the drug trade theme in the episode. The guest cast included Judson Scott and Merritt Butrick who had both appeared in Star Trek II: The Wrath of Khan (1982). The episode received mixed reviews with criticism directed at the subject matter and the unsubtle nature of the presentation.

== Plot ==
The Enterprise attempts to rescue the freighter Sanction, which has been disabled by a star's magnetic field and is about to collide with a planet. An agreement is reached to transport over the occupants of the freighter, but they surprisingly send over cargo barrels first. The Enterprise crew attempts to transport the freighter's occupants, but is only successful in recovering four of them before the ship is destroyed. Two, T'Jon (Merritt Butrick) and Romas (Richard Lineback), are scruffy and unshaven, while the other two, Sobi (Judson Scott) and Langor (Kimberly Farr), are groomed and well dressed. They all show relief that the barrels made it over, and little remorse for the lost ship and crewmen. The two groups start to fight over the ownership of the barrels using electrical shock attack from their bodies and are escorted to the observation lounge under guard.

The two pairs come from different planets within the same system. It is explained that the barrels contain felicium, a medicine for a plague which is ravaging the planet Ornara. The medicine is produced on the planet Brekka but the Ornarans are the only race in the system with the means of space travel; the two remaining Ornaran ships were built long ago and are beginning to fail due to overuse and lack of maintenance; the Ornarans no longer know how to repair them. Captain Jean-Luc Picard (Patrick Stewart) offers to return them each to Ornara and provide replacement parts for the remaining freighters. The Brekkans, Sobi and Langor, argue that they retain ownership of the felicium, as the items the Ornarans offered in payment were lost on board the freighter. T'Jon and Romas, of Ornara, are suffering from the effects of the plague and are sent to sickbay where Dr. Beverly Crusher (Gates McFadden) can find no reason for their symptoms.

In a gesture of goodwill following the demand of compassion from Crusher, the Brekkans offer two doses of felicium for T'Jon and Romas's immediate needs. Langor explains that the entire Brekkan economy and industry is devoted to producing the medicine for Ornara, whose inhabitants provide Brekka with the necessities of daily life in return. After T'Jon and Romas take their doses, Dr. Crusher realizes that felicium is actually a highly addictive narcotic, and the plague itself was cured long before, so the symptoms believed to be attributed to the plague are actually withdrawal symptoms. Crusher wants to offer assistance to aid the Ornarans in breaking free of their addiction but Picard warns that the Federation cannot intervene due to the Prime Directive. He and Dr. Crusher later question the Brekkans alone and confirm that the Brekkans know the truth regarding the plague being eradicated, the addictive nature of the medicine and are exploiting the Ornarans because Brekka's economy would collapse if the Ornarans no longer needed felicium.

The Enterprise arrives at Ornara and Sobi and Langor have agreed to provide the felicium to the Ornarans for later payment. Picard announces that as the Prime Directive prevents him from interfering in the transactions between the two planets, it also prevents him from providing any replacement parts for the ageing freighters. Sobi and Langor, T'Jon and Romas are furious at the decision as it means that the trade between Ornara and Brekka will stop because the freighters can no longer make the trips without the parts. After the four are transported off the Enterprise, Picard confides to Dr. Crusher that while the Ornarans may suffer from withdrawal symptoms in the short term, this will be an opportunity for both races to advance in their own ways.

== Production ==
I take the blame for that. I jammed that in over everyone's objections. They were screaming on the set, the actors were screaming, they were puking, they were yelling, 'We can't do this.' I said, 'No, there are kids out there. If we're going to make the message, let's make the message.' If it offends the adults or bothers some kids, then, by God, we're going to do it.

— Maurice Hurley, regarding the "Just Say No" speech

The episode was influenced by co-executive producer Maurice Hurley's recent work on Miami Vice, and was intended to have the Enterprise come across a drug deal in progress. Hurley was also responsible for the insertion of a "Just Say No" style drugs speech by Tasha Yar (Denise Crosby) to Wesley Crusher (Wil Wheaton), which came over the objections from the cast.

Guest stars in this episode included two who had previously appeared in Star Trek II: The Wrath of Khan (1982), as Sobi and T'Jon were played by Judson Scott and Merritt Butrick respectively. Butrick had also appeared in Star Trek III: The Search for Spock; on both occasions he portrayed David Marcus, the son of Captain James T. Kirk. He died of AIDS less than a year after filming this episode.

Director Win Phelps recalled that there were numerous continuity issues throughout filming, with character motivations changing from one scene to the next. Because of changes to the script, the actors were often acting scenes that they had not seen the script for before the first take. "Symbiosis" was filmed after "Skin of Evil", which featured the death of Tasha Yar, making this the final filmed episode with Denise Crosby as Yar until she reappeared in "Yesterday's Enterprise". Towards the end of the episode, as Picard and Crusher leave the cargo bay, Crosby can be seen waving goodbye to the camera behind them (timestamp 42:15, she is clearly visible above Patrick Stewart's left shoulder as the bay doors close). LeVar Burton later used behind the scenes footage from this episode in a feature on his show Reading Rainbow, in the episode "The Bionic Bunny Show".

== Reception ==
"Symbiosis" aired in broadcast syndication during the week commencing April 22, 1988. It received Nielsen ratings of 10.8, reflecting the percentage of all households watching the episode during its timeslot. This was the highest ratings received by the series since the broadcast of "Too Short a Season" during the preceding February. The ratings received by "Symbiosis" were not beaten until the first episode of the second season, "The Child".

Several reviewers re-watched the episode after the end of the series. Zack Handlen reviewed the episode for The A.V. Club in May 2010. He felt that the drug use allegory could have been better refined but praised the performance of Patrick Stewart and gave the episode an overall grade of a B. Keith DeCandido watched the episode for Tor.com, and described it as the least subtle "message" based episode since The Original Series episode "Let That Be Your Last Battlefield". He criticised the electricity-based powers of the two alien species, saying that they did not add anything to the plot. He gave the episode a score of four out of ten.

James Hunt of the website Den of Geek said that "This is one of those episodes which exemplify all that is awful about Star Trek in general. I'm not talking about season one's dubious production values (which, to be fair, are considerably more even than they were when the series began) but about the episode's very fabric." Michelle Erica Green for TrekNation thought that the episode could have been better if the guest cast had been better. She felt that the episode fell foul of several TNG season one writing errors, such as Deanna Troi's statements breaking mounting tension, the crew failing to do quite simple tasks like separating feuding aliens and William Riker being held hostage for the second time in successive episodes.

== Home media release ==
The first home media release of "Symbiosis" was on VHS cassette, appearing on May 26, 1993 in the United States and Canada. The episode was later included on the Star Trek: The Next Generation season one DVD box set, released in March 2002, and then released as part of the season one Blu-ray set on July 24, 2012.
