= Maurice Hurley =

American screenwriter and producer (1939–2015)

- Born: Maurice Hurley; August 16, 1939; Boston, Massachusetts
- Died: February 24, 2015 (aged 75)
- Occupations: Screenwriter and producer

Maurice Hurley (August 16, 1939 – February 24, 2015) was an American screenwriter and producer known best for his work on Star Trek: The Next Generation.

== Career ==
In the 1980s, his work for television included writing scripts for The Equalizer and Miami Vice. He also produced some episodes of The Equalizer.

He wrote the script for the film Firebird 2015 AD in 1981, and in 2002 co-wrote the film Groom Lake with William Shatner.

Hurley co-created the show Pointman with Joel Surnow & Steve Hattman; Surnow would go on to create 24 & La Femme Nikita and Hurley would work with him for a time there as a writer/producer. Other TV efforts included writing and/or producing episodes of Baywatch, Baywatch Nights, Kung Fu: The Legend Continues and Diagnosis: Murder.

In Star Trek: The Next Generation, Hurley was the series' first head writer and show runner. His influence was substantial as he introduced creative elements on the series that became part of the franchise, like the Borg. Hurley was responsible for firing Gates McFadden, who played the role of Dr. Beverly Crusher, at the end of the show's first season. Executive producer Rick Berman recalled that Hurley "had a real bone to pick" with McFadden and did not like her acting. McFadden clashed with Hurley's take on her character during filming, stating, "I definitely pissed off Hurley. Because I kept saying 'Why is it that I've raised this genius kid... and yet every time there's anything serious it's only the male characters who talk to him?'" He left the series after its second season, which left the door open for Rick Berman to rehire McFadden after dismissing her replacement Diana Muldaur. Hurley was replaced by Michael Wagner for four episodes and ultimately by Michael Piller.

In 1993, he returned to the franchise briefly, asked by Berman to write an initial draft for the first Next Generation feature film Star Trek Generations that would transition the film series from the original Enterprise crew to the new crew. Hurley's story treatment involved a plot in which James T. Kirk is somehow propelled into the future, where he manifests on the holodeck and works with Jean-Luc Picard to help solve a dilemma involving an interdimensional species, but Berman ultimately chose a script treatment proposed by Ronald D. Moore and Brannon Braga.
