= Star Trek: The Next Generation season 1 =

1987–88 season of American television series

Star Trek: The Next Generation
- Season 1
- Blu-ray cover
- Starring: Patrick Stewart; Jonathan Frakes; LeVar Burton; Denise Crosby; Michael Dorn; Gates McFadden; Marina Sirtis; Brent Spiner; Wil Wheaton
- No. of episodes: 26

Release
- Original network: Broadcast syndication
- Original release: September 28, 1987 – May 16, 1988

Season chronology
- Next → Season 2

The first season of the American television science fiction series Star Trek: The Next Generation commenced airing in broadcast syndication in the United States on September 28, 1987, and concluded on May 16, 1988, after 26 episodes were broadcast. Set in the 24th century, the series follows the adventures of the crew of the Starfleet starship Enterprise-D. It was the first live-action television series in the franchise to be broadcast since Star Trek: The Original Series was cancelled in 1969, and the first to feature all new characters. Paramount Television eventually sought the advice of the creator of Star Trek, Gene Roddenberry, who set about creating the new show with mostly former The Original Series staff members. An entirely new cast were sought, which concerned some members of The Original Series crew, as Roddenberry did not want to re-tread the same steps as he had in the first series to the extent that well-known Star Trek aliens such as Vulcans, Klingons and Romulans were banned at first.

The characters in the series gradually changed during preproduction, with adjustments made to the names, genders and ethnicity. When the cast was announced at first, LeVar Burton was the main actor highlighted because of his work on the Roots mini series; his character, Geordi La Forge, was named for a disabled fan. Before Star Trek: The Next Generation, Burton had also worked on the 1983–2006 PBS series Reading Rainbow. Although the casting was managed by producers Rick Berman and Robert H. Justman, Roddenberry intervened to switch the characters assigned to Marina Sirtis and Denise Crosby. Sirtis took over Crosby's role as Deanna Troi, and Crosby became Tasha Yar, who had been named Macha Hernandez while Sirtis held the part. Behind the scenes, the writing team became chaotic. Eddie Milkis had quit prior to casting, with Berman taking over from him. Roddenberry's insistence on re-writing scripts and unusual behaviour alienated some staff. Longtime Star Trek contributor D. C. Fontana quit, filing a claim with the Writers Guild of America as she had been acting as story editor but was unpaid in the role. Such were the troubles that the series had a problem recruiting potential writers halfway through the season. By the end of the second season, all the writing staff recruited during season one except for Rick Berman had quit.

As the series was being launched directly into syndication, there were concerns that it could affect the ratings. "Encounter at Farpoint", the pilot, was broadcast to Nielsen ratings of 15.7 percent, and after a lull seeing ratings for "The Last Outpost" reach a season low of 8.9 percent, they increased again and by the end of the first season, it had become the most popular syndicated series on television. While highly anticipated, initial reviews other than for "Encounter at Farpoint" were poor. The second episode, "The Naked Now" had fans and critics concerned that The Next Generation would re-hash plots of The Original Series, and "Code of Honor" was seen as racist. The season continues to attract mixed to negative reviews, though the episodes "The Big Goodbye" and "11001001" have frequently been singled out for praise. It was nominated for seven Emmy Awards, winning in makeup, costume design and sound editing. "The Big Goodbye" was awarded a Peabody Award, while cast member Wil Wheaton was nominated for an award at the 9th Youth in Film Awards. The season was first released on DVD on March 26, 2002, on Region 1, and was subsequently released in other regions. The region-free Blu-ray releases came in July 2012.

== Production ==
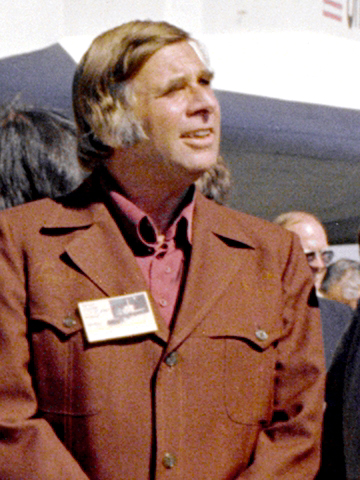
Star Trek creator Gene Roddenberry (pictured in 1976) was hired by Paramount to create a new television series set in the same universe

As production was underway on the film Star Trek IV: The Voyage Home, Paramount executives began to work on ideas to bring Star Trek back to television, hiring writer/producer Greg Strangis to develop some proposals. This was not the first time that this had been considered following the success of Star Trek: The Original Series in broadcast syndication, as a series entitled Star Trek: Phase II had been briefly worked on in the late seventies between attempts at creating a film based on The Original Series. The pilot episode of Phase II, entitled "In Thy Image" was changed to become the first Star Trek film, Star Trek: The Motion Picture. Paramount spoke to Leonard Nimoy, who was still portraying Spock in the film franchise, about the new series. They offered him the chance of producing the new series, but he turned them down due to the time commitment.

Next, Paramount sought to consult franchise creator Gene Roddenberry. He turned down the idea of running the show, given the time that production of The Original Series had distracted him from his family. But Paramount told him that it was impossible to pursue the new series otherwise, Roddenberry began to make plans for the series—with a new cast, as he wanted to avoid retreading and recreating the same roles now seen in the film franchise. Although they had not planned on it originally, Paramount hired Roddenberry to oversee the production and fired Strangis. However, one of his ideas appeared in the premise of The Next Generation, that the Federation and the Klingons had become allies. The first announcement of a new series was made by Roddenberry publicly on October 10, 1986.

Several stars of The Original Series and the film franchise stated that they did not like the premise of a new series set in the same universe that did not feature them. DeForest Kelley, who appeared in the pilot as Admiral Leonard McCoy, said that while he understood that the studio wanted to keep the franchise going beyond them, he felt that "there's only one Star Trek, and that's ours". James Doohan, who played Montgomery "Scotty" Scott, said that Star Trek was about the characters and with a new cast the studio was "trying to fool the public, and that's bad business." William Shatner, who portrayed James T. Kirk, was concerned with the overexposure of the franchise and how a new television series could affect future films.

A memo sent on October 24, showed that Robert H. Justman, an associate producer on The Original Series, was working with Roddenberry on the new plans for a series, which was at that time untitled. They took several influences from the criticism of the previous series in David Gerrold's The Worlds of Star Trek, and brought the writer of "The Trouble with Tribbles" on as a writer. Gerrold went on to produce the series bible, although Roddenberry took the credit for it. Roddenberry also brought together former Star Trek associate producer Eddie Milkis, who had gone on to produce series such as Happy Days. Ideas were suggested such as an android and Klingon marine, which each made it into the final series, as well as the great-great-great-granddaughter of James T. Kirk, which did not.

Ideas proposed for Phase II were included, such as having the second-in-command leading the away team, an idea originally proposed in Gerrold's The Worlds of Star Trek. Concepts refined from Star Trek: The Animated Series such as the "rec room" were also incorporated, becoming the holodeck. Roddenberry also insisted that technology failures should not be a routinely used plot device. The new version of the starship Enterprise was at first designated NCC-1701-7, but following the numbering pattern established in The Voyage Home, became NCC-1701-G. Roddenberry also insisted that the new series avoid reappearances by alien races well known from The Original Series, specifically banning Romulans, Vulcans and the majority of Klingons. These plans did not last, with Klingons being central to the plot of "Heart of Glory", a Vulcan appearing in "Coming of Age", and Romulans making their first appearance in the season finale, "The Neutral Zone".

=== Crew ===
They were joined by Robert Lewin as writing producer, based on a recommendation by Justman who had worked with him previously. Lewin was the first person to be involved in the series who did not have a background working on the franchise. D. C. Fontana, who had originally been Roddenberry's secretary while working on The Original Series and went on to become the story editor for the show, was also brought onto the staff of The Next Generation. She was also the story editor on the new series, but sought a promised associate producer credit. Non-writing staff who were brought from working on the film franchise included Rick Sternbach and Andrew Probert, as well as Michael Okuda who was hired as a scenic artist. Roddenberry hired costume designer William Ware Theiss, who had designed The Original Series costumes, while Milkis and Justman recruited art director Herman Zimmerman. Rick Berman joined the team as the liaison between Roddenberry's team and Paramount Television.

Roddenberry proved a tough negotiator in hiring staff. When he made his first offers to recruit Gerrold and Fontana, they were each below the minimum salaries as designated by the Writers Guild of America. After Fontana continued to oppose the rates offered that were lower than dictated by WGA rates, Roddenberry brought his personal lawyer, Leonard Maizlish, to argue his case. Gerrold found that Maizlish's influence changed Roddenberry, and Gerrold started to be called disloyal by Roddenberry when he disagreed with him. Fontana drafted the script for the pilot episode, "Encounter at Farpoint", while Gerrold and another Original Series staffer, John D.F. Black, also worked up scripts of their own.

Based on the pilot script at that point and Gerrold and Roddenberry's bible, the design team began to work up plans for sets and props. After viewing the movie series sets, they decided that they needed to build a new bridge for the new Enterprise to meet Roddenberry's proclaimed "technology unchained" ideal. Probert, who had worked on the design for Phase II and The Motion Picture, based the exterior design for the Enterprise on an abandoned design he had created at the time. Some of the film sets were used, as the film bridge was re-dressed to appear as the battle bridge, and was further re-dressed many times over the course of The Next Generation to represent various bridges.

The first staffing change occurred early in 1987, with Milkis leaving the production. He had signed a one-year contract, but decided to prioritise other commitments. Berman was drafted in to replace him, accepting the new position instead of being the studio liaison. Milkis later said that it was a seamless transition because of the level of knowledge Berman had gained on the production. Fontana and Roddenberry had a falling out over the associate producer position, which she eventually gained. The relationship between the two became so strained that she recorded all meetings with him, and left after the first couple of episodes. Her work on "The Naked Now" was credited to the pseudonym J. Michael Bingham. She put in a claim with the Writers Guild that she had also worked as a story editor on the series but was never paid for it, which was settled amicably with Paramount. Meanwhile, Maizlish started working effectively as a story editor, while production meetings often resulted in Roddenberry ranting about various issues. Other writers and producers, including Herbert Wright and Maurice Hurley, joined the team.

Justman left after half of season one, later explaining ,"I'd accomplished what I wanted to accomplish. Star Trek wasn't a fluke". They were not the only departures, as the number of employees departing the increasingly chaotic production started to become legendary in the WGA. By mid-season the show was having difficulty recruiting writers, as there were rumours about how difficult working with Roddenberry had become. He often rewrote scripts, inserting sexual overtones, while blaming the original writers for the problems with the parts that he had inserted. His fellow producers blamed the issues and inconsistencies on his drinking, although his writing had all but stopped by around two-thirds of the way through the first season. Gerrold left after the completion of the first season, choosing not to renew his contract due to the issues with his script for an unfilmed episode called "Blood and Fire" and his relationship with Roddenberry and Maizlish. Head writer Lewin also left the team at the end of the season. Out of all the writing staff who worked on the show during the first season, only Rick Berman remained following season two.

=== Casting ===
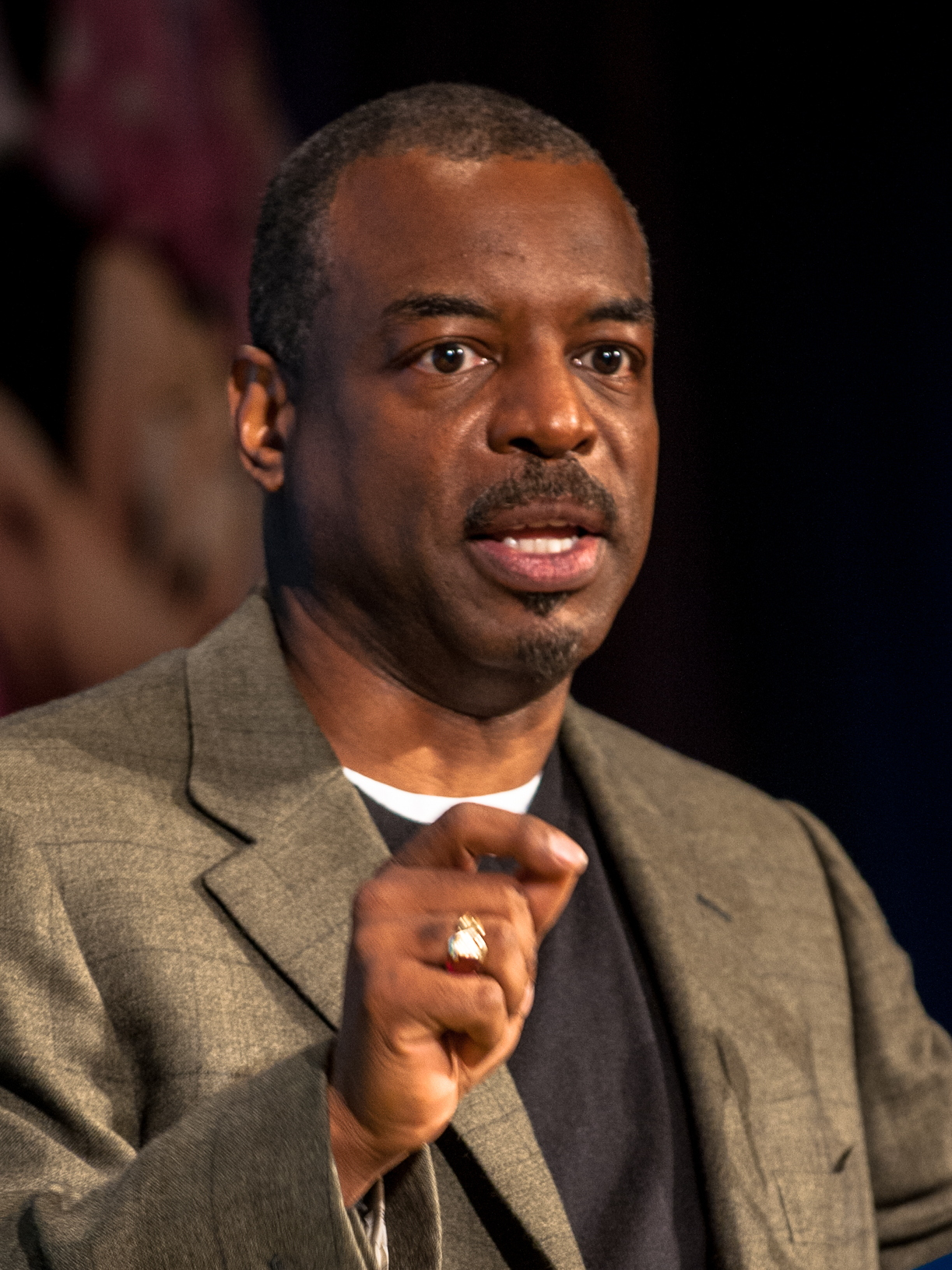
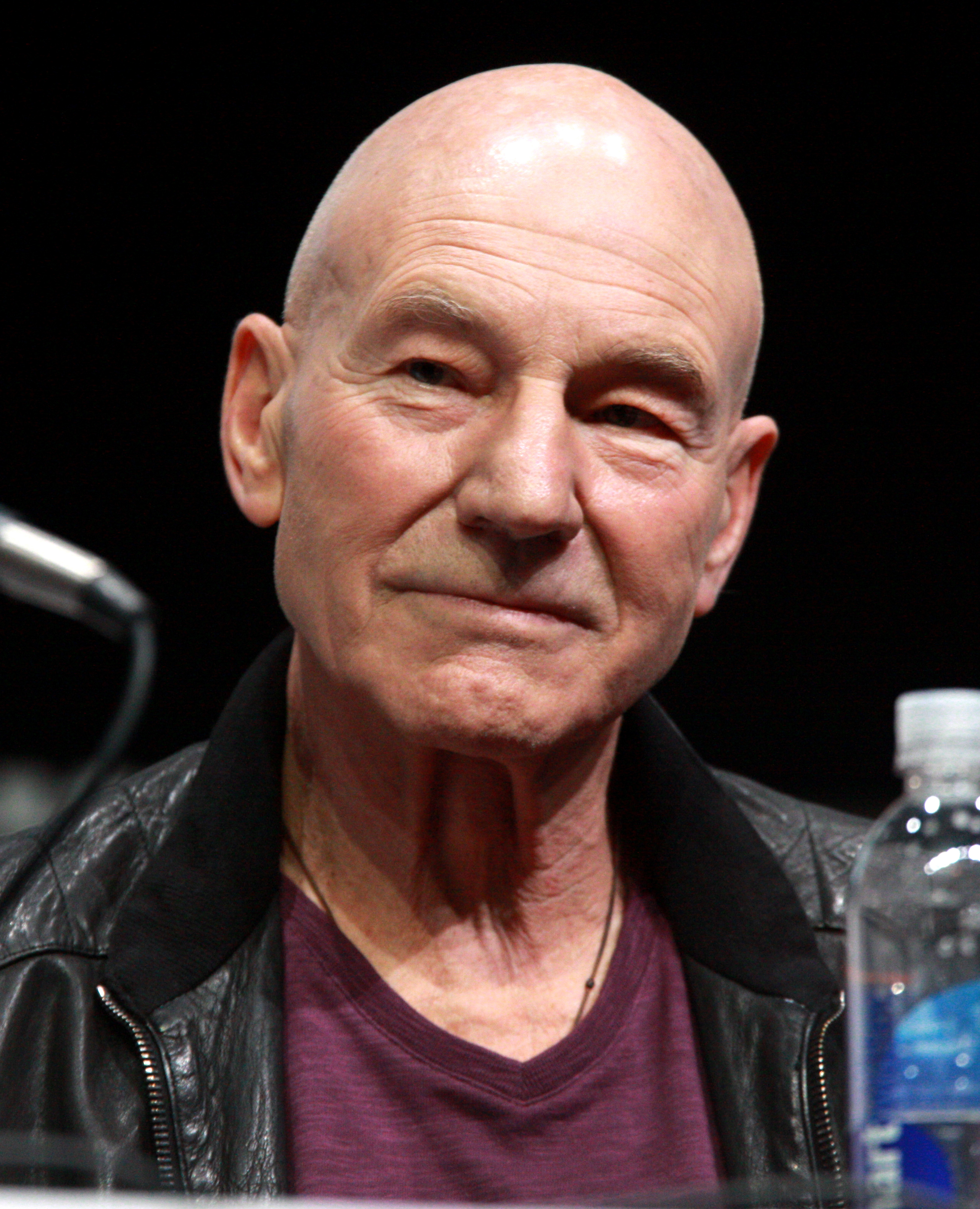
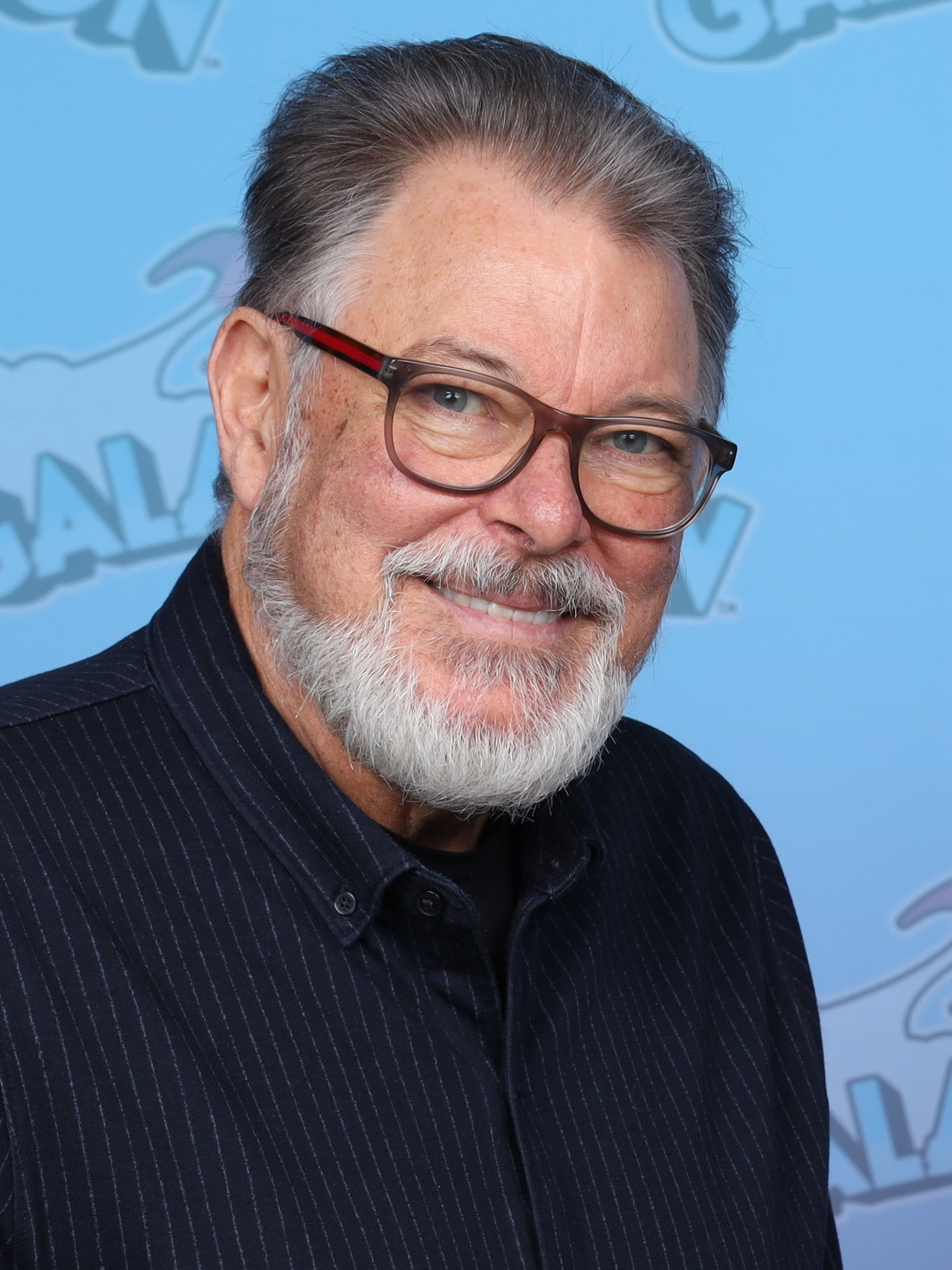
LeVar Burton, Patrick Stewart and Jonathan Frakes (pictured left to right) were the only actors mentioned in the initial The Next Generation casting press release in May 1987.

An initial casting call was released to talent agencies on December 10, 1986, for eight main cast members. These featured several minor differences in the eventual names, such as Captain Julien Picard, William Ryker and Leslie Crusher (a 15-year-old girl). It also featured the security chief, Macha Hernandez. The Captain was given the nickname of "Luke", and both his and Ryker's names took on their more familiar forms at some point between the two versions of the writer's guide in February and March 1987. Leslie Crusher was considered as a boy named Wesley prior to the casting call; the gender change was later made permanent. Geordi La Forge was named for a quadriplegic fan named George La Forge who had died in 1975, while Macha evolved over time to eventually become Tasha Yar.

Preliminary casting began in March 1987, with Justman and Berman in charge of the process. In May, the actors who were to receive star billing were announced. In the initial press release, only three actors were discussed; primarily LeVar Burton as La Forge, due to the actor's appearances in the mini-series Roots. Also included in that release were the announcements of Patrick Stewart, a member of the Royal Shakespeare Company as Captain Picard, and Jonathan Frakes, formerly of the North and South miniseries. Marina Sirtis and Denise Crosby were cast as Masha Hernandez and Deanna Troi respectively, but Roddenberry decided to switch the roles, at which point Hernandez became Yar.

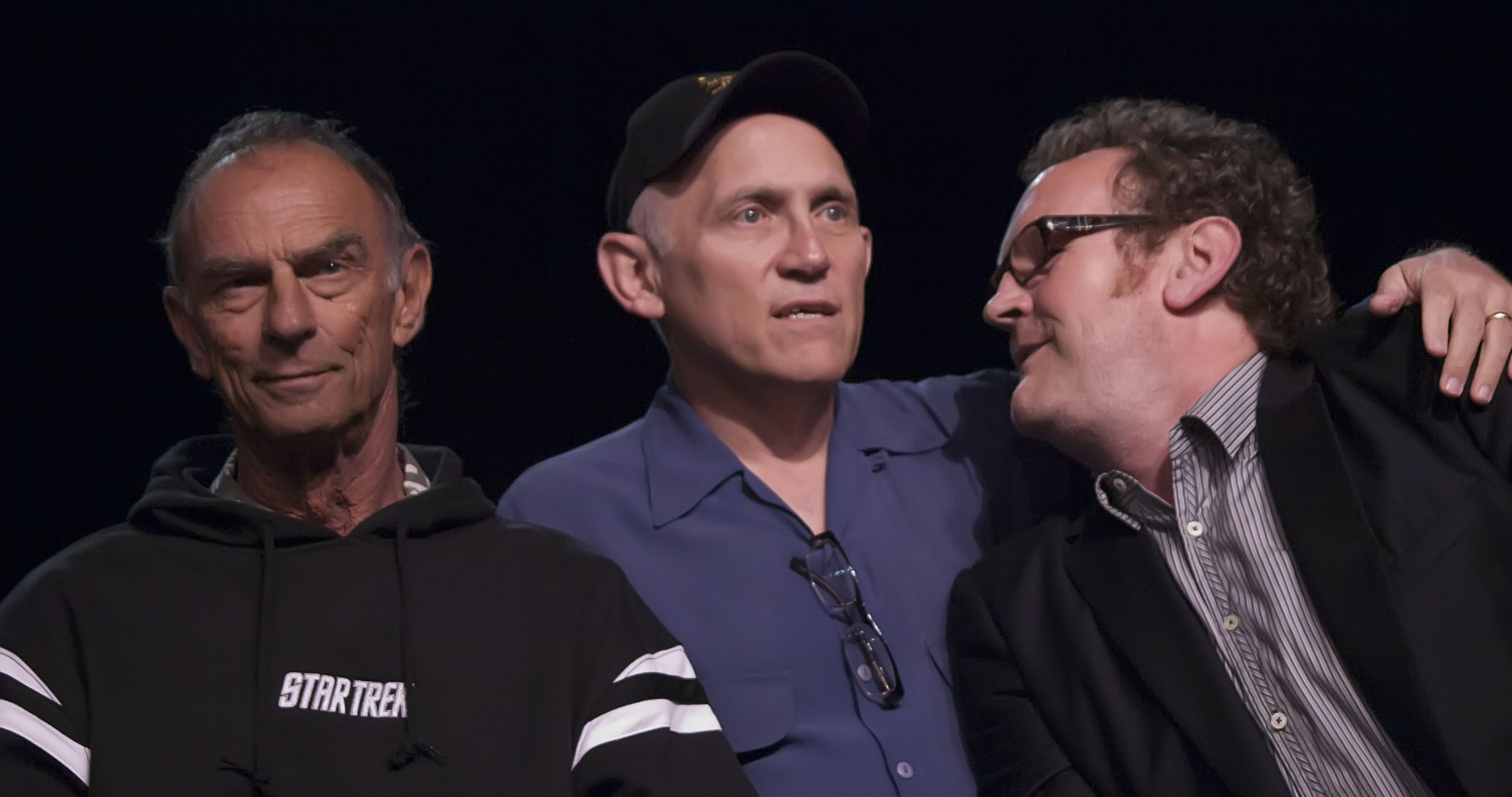
Marc Alaimo, Armin Shimerman, and Colm Meaney (pictured left to right) each made appearances in the first season of The Next Generation, and appeared throughout Deep Space Nine.

The rest of the cast included Brent Spiner as the android Data, Gates McFadden as Doctor Beverly Crusher, Wil Wheaton as Beverly's son, Wesley Crusher. Outside of the main cast, Michael Dorn successfully auditioned to portray Lieutenant (j.g) Worf. It had originally been planned for Dorn to appear in seven out of the first thirteen episodes, but after appearing in the pilot it was decided to expand the role and add him to the main cast. Other guest actors who made their first appearances during season one included John de Lancie as Q and Eric Menyuk as the Traveler. Majel Barrett, who had previously appeared as Nurse Christine Chapel in the original Star Trek, made her first appearance as Lwaxana Troi during season one and voiced the Enterprise computer throughout.

Several future Star Trek: Deep Space Nine alumni also appeared in the first season of The Next Generation, although not in roles in which they later featured. These included Armin Shimerman as a wedding box in "Haven" and as Letek in "The Last Outpost" (he later appeared as other Ferengi before gaining the main cast role of Quark in Deep Space Nine). Marc Alaimo appeared as an Antican in "Lonely Among Us", before appearing in different makeup as the Romulan Captain Tebok in the first-season finale "The Neutral Zone"; he later appeared as the Cardassian Gul Macet in The Next Generation fourth season episode "The Wounded" and was later cast as the recurring character of Gul Dukat in Deep Space Nine. Colm Meaney appeared as a conn ensign in two episodes during the season, later established as Chief Miles O'Brien in season two, and became a main cast member of Deep Space Nine.

Crosby decided to leave the series part way through the first season, due to the underdevelopment of her character, Tasha Yar. She later said about the situation in an interview with the official Star Trek website, "I was miserable. I couldn't wait to get off that show. I was dying". Roddenberry agreed to her request to leave, and she returned in the third season episode "Yesterday's Enterprise". Another change to the cast, this time after the end of the first season, was the firing of McFadden, who played Dr. Crusher. This was later attributed to the actions of Hurley and once he left the crew, she returned to the role at the start of the third season.

== Reception ==
=== Ratings ===
The season one ratings of Star Trek: The Next Generation

Star Trek: The Next Generation was released into broadcast syndication, meaning that it was hosted on multiple television stations without going through a broadcast network. At the time this was relatively unheard of, although The Original Series had become successful following release on syndication after an initial run on NBC. In advance of the first airing of the pilot, "Encounter at Farpoint", the show had been sold in 171 markets. There were concerns at the time that such a method of broadcasting would negatively impact the ratings received by the series, with Justman suggesting that the payoff would be worth it due to the lack of interference from a potential network.

"Encounter at Farpoint" received Nielsen ratings of 15.7 percent, and it was granted a commitment for a further 24 one-hour episodes following the broadcast. The pilot was the highest rated episode of the first season; the lowest rated episode of the first season was "The Last Outpost", the fourth episode broadcast, which received ratings of 8.9 percent. Three episodes later, "Justice" was broadcast, which received a rating of 12.7 percent, the highest for the season other than the pilot. As of the period between September 6 and January 3, the show was only outranked in the Nielsen Ratings by Wheel of Fortune and Jeopardy! for shows released directly into syndication, and it became the highest rated syndicated series by the end of the first season, which prompted several other series to be released directly into syndication.

=== Reviews ===
Although it was highly anticipated, when the series was initially broadcast, the response was lukewarm from fans and reviewers. John J. O'Connor reviewed the first episode for The New York Times, and simply hoped that the action and pace would increase in the episodes aired after the pilot. Other critics of "Encounter at Farpoint" were more positive; Don Merrill, writing for TV Guide said that the show was a "worthy successor to the original". Jill L. Lanford for The Herald Journal said that it was a resurrection of a "legend" and was reminiscent of The Original Series episodes "Arena" and "The Squire of Gothos". She added that it was the "perfect vehicle to introduce the crew", and a "perfect start". There was also some initial criticism of the casting, with Tom Shales of The Washington Post saying Patrick Stewart was a "grim bald crank who would make a better villain", and Jonathan Frakes "verges on namby-pamby". Mark Jones and Lance Parkin, in their book Beyond the Final Frontier: An Unauthorised Review of Star Trek, said the first season "often felt like an uneasy politically correct attempt to recreate one of the sixties' least politically correct shows."

While critics approved of certain elements of the show such as the design of the new Enterprise, the early episodes after the pilot were received negatively. "The Naked Now", the second episode of the season, was based on the original series episode "The Naked Time". This resulted in some fans, and former Star Trek writers, becoming concerned that the series would continue to "re-hash" old plots. "Code of Honor" has been seen in hindsight as being racist, with Stewart later saying that the cast and crew were embarrassed by it. Mark A. Altman felt that The Next Generation during the first season was a missed opportunity to address issues relevant to modern life, which he said that The Original Series had done successfully in the sixties. He called some episodes "trite", and suggested that elements were straight rehashes of previous plots with only some names and scenarios changed. Marina Sirtis remarked while promoting Star Trek: Nemesis that in the beginning "they bloody hated us".

Reviewing the series as part of the DVD release in 2002, Marc Bernardin for Entertainment Weekly said of season one, that it was "almost hard to believe ... just how bad much of it was". He thought that the first season was too similar to the end of the "cheesy" original series but said that it "succeeded where it needed to: It introduced viewers to the characters who would carry the torch through six more seasons", and gave it a score of B+. Tor.com reviewer Keith DeCandido was less positive, feeling that it "earned" its reputation as the poorest of The Next Generation's seven seasons because "the episodes were uneven, poorly plotted, ineptly scripted, and acted by actors who were still trying to figure their characters out". He gave it a score of 5 out of 10. The season has been given an 80% "fresh" rating by review aggregator website Rotten Tomatoes.

=== Accolades ===
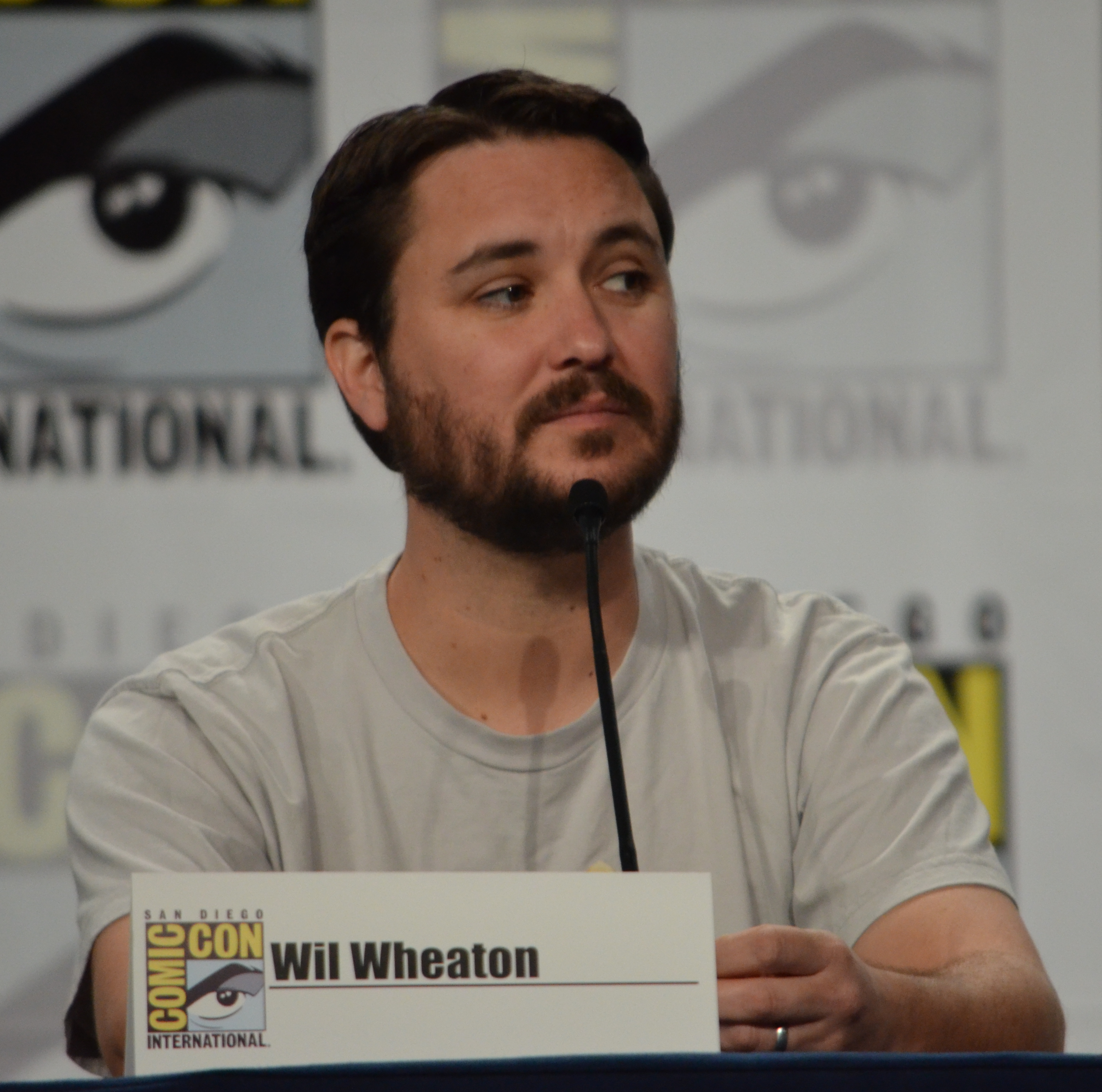
Wil Wheaton was the only individual actor during season one to be nominated for an award.

Star Trek: The Next Generation received seven nominations at the 40th Primetime Emmy Awards. Chris Haire, Doug Davey, Jerry Clemans and Alan Bernard were nominated for "Outstanding Sound Mixing for a Drama Series" for work on the episode "Where No One Has Gone Before". Edward R. Brown was nominated for "Outstanding Cinematography for a Series" for "The Big Goodbye".

The makeup teams on the show were nominated for two episodes for "Outstanding Achievement Makeup for a Series", for the episodes "Coming of Age" and "Conspiracy", winning the award for the latter episode. William Ware Theiss won the award "Outstanding Costume Design for a Series" for "The Big Goodbye", while the team working on "11001001" won the Emmy for "Outstanding Sound Editing for a Series".

"The Big Goodbye" also won a Peabody Award. The series' premiere episode, "Encounter at Farpoint" was nominated for "Best Dramatic Presentation" at the 1988 Hugo Awards. Wil Wheaton was nominated for "Best Young Actor Starring in a Television Drama Series" at the 9th Youth in Film Awards for his portrayal of Wesley Crusher.

== Cast ==
=== Main cast ===
- Patrick Stewart as Captain Jean-Luc Picard
- Jonathan Frakes as Commander William Riker
- LeVar Burton as Lt. (j.g.) Geordi La Forge
- Denise Crosby as Lt. Tasha Yar
- Michael Dorn as Lt. (j.g.) Worf
- Gates McFadden as Dr. (Cmdr.) Beverly Crusher
- Marina Sirtis as Counselor (Lt. Cmdr.) Deanna Troi
- Brent Spiner as Lt. Cmdr. Data
- Wil Wheaton as Wesley Crusher (Later made an Acting Ensign in the episode "Where No One Has Gone Before")

=== Recurring cast ===
- John de Lancie as Q (2 episodes)
- Colm Meaney as a Conn Ensign/Security Officer (2 episodes)
- Armin Shimerman as Letek (1 episode) and Betazoid Gift Box (1 episode)
- Biff Yeager as Lt. Cmdr. Argyle (2 episodes)
- Ward Costello as Rear Admiral Gregory Quinn (2 episodes)
- Robert Schenkkan as Lt. Cmdr. Dexter Remmick (2 episodes)
- Majel Barrett as Lwaxana Troi (1 episode)
- Carel Struycken as Mr. Homn (1 episode)
- Eric Menyuk as The Traveler (1 episode)

== Episodes ==
In the following table, episodes are listed by the order in which they aired, and may not necessarily correspond to their production codes.

No. overall	No. in season	Title	Directed by	Written by	Original release date	Prod. code	Nielsen rating
1	1	"Encounter at Farpoint"	Corey Allen	D. C. Fontana & Gene Roddenberry	September 28, 1987	101; 102	15.7
2	2	"Encounter at Farpoint"	Corey Allen	D. C. Fontana & Gene Roddenberry	September 28, 1987	101; 102	15.7
The new starship Enterprise begins her maiden voyage by uncovering the mysteries of an advanced space station. The crew's mission is threatened by an omnipotent being named Q, who puts them on trial for the crimes of all humanity.: Originally shown as a two-hour pilot movie, but in syndication is shown as 2 separate episodes.
3	3	"The Naked Now"	Paul Lynch	Story by : John D. F. Black and D. C. Fontana (Note: Credited as J. Michael Bingham); Teleplay by : D. C. Fontana	October 5, 1987	103	11.5
The crew of the Enterprise find the crew of a scientific vessel dead. They soon fall prey to a mysterious, communicable contaminant causing the crew to experience symptoms similar to alcohol intoxication, threatening the lives of all aboard the ship.
4	4	"Code of Honor"	Russ Mayberry	Katharyn Powers & Michael Baron	October 12, 1987	104	9.5
Lt. Yar is abducted by the leader of a people who abide by a strict code of honor, which requires her participation in a fight to the death.
5	5	"The Last Outpost"	Richard Colla	Story by : Richard Krzmeien; Teleplay by : Herbert Wright	October 19, 1987	107	8.9
An unknown force immobilizes the Enterprise during the Federation's first encounter with a new alien threat—the Ferengi.
6	6	"Where No One Has Gone Before"	Rob Bowman	Diane Duane & Michael Reaves	October 26, 1987	106	10.5
Warp efficiency tests send the Enterprise traveling far beyond known space, where the crew's imagination takes on real form. First appearance of Eric Menyuk as The Traveler.
7	7	"Lonely Among Us"	Cliff Bole	Story by : Michael Halperin; Teleplay by : D. C. Fontana	November 2, 1987	108	12.1
An alien entity possesses Dr. Crusher, Worf, and Picard while the Enterprise is transporting delegates from two feuding planets.
8	8	"Justice"	James L. Conway	Story by : John D. F. Black (Note: Credited as Ralph Wills) & Worley Thorne; Teleplay by : Worley Thorne	November 9, 1987	109	12.7
Wesley breaks an idyllic world's trivial law by accidentally stepping on flowers and faces a death sentence.
9	9	"The Battle"	Rob Bowman	Story by : Larry Forrester; Teleplay by : Herbert Wright	November 16, 1987	110	10.5
A Ferengi captain returns the abandoned Stargazer to its former captain, Jean-Luc Picard. Picard, who experiences severe headaches, begins to relive the "Battle of Maxia" in which he lost the ship.
10	10	"Hide and Q"	Cliff Bole	Story by : Maurice Hurley (Note: Credited as C.J. Holland); Teleplay by : Maurice Hurley & Gene Roddenberry	November 23, 1987	111	11.0
Q returns to the Enterprise to tempt Commander Riker into joining the Q Continuum with the lure of Q's powers.
11	11	"Haven"	Richard Compton	Story by : Tracy Tormé & Lan O'Kun; Teleplay by : Tracy Tormé	November 30, 1987	105	10.3
Lwaxana Troi visits her daughter, Counselor Troi, and prepares her for an arranged marriage.
12	12	"The Big Goodbye"	Joseph L. Scanlan	Tracy Tormé	January 11, 1988	113	11.5
A computer malfunction traps Picard, Data, and Dr. Crusher in a Dixon Hill holodeck program set in early-20th-century Earth.
13	13	"Datalore"	Rob Bowman	Story by : Robert Lewin & Maurice Hurley; Teleplay by : Robert Lewin & Gene Roddenberry	January 18, 1988	114	10.3
The Enterprise crew finds a disassembled android identical to Data at the site of the Omicron Theta colony—where Data was found—which was destroyed by a life form dubbed "the Crystalline Entity." The reassembled android, Lore, brings the Crystalline Entity to the Enterprise.
14	14	"Angel One"	Michael Rhodes	Patrick Barry	January 25, 1988	115	11.4
The Enterprise visits a world dominated by women to rescue survivors of a downed freighter.
15	15	"11001001"	Paul Lynch	Maurice Hurley & Robert Lewin	February 1, 1988	116	10.7
Bynars upgrade the Enterprise's computers in spacedock. Riker and Picard become distracted by a surprisingly realistic holodeck character.
16	16	"Too Short A Season"	Rob Bowman	Story by : Michael Michaelian; Teleplay by : Michael Michaelian & D. C. Fontana	February 8, 1988	112	10.9
The Enterprise transports a legendary elderly admiral who must once again negotiate a hostage situation involving a man from decades earlier in his career. The admiral however, is mysteriously growing younger the farther along their mission progresses.
17	17	"When the Bough Breaks"	Kim Manners	Hannah Louise Shearer	February 15, 1988	118	10.2
A planet formerly existing only in legend uncloaks and requests help from the Enterprise. The planet's inhabitants are sterile and want to adopt children from the Enterprise—by force, if necessary.
18	18	"Home Soil"	Corey Allen	Story by : Karl Geurs & Ralph Sanchez and Robert Sabaroff; Teleplay by : Robert Sabaroff	February 22, 1988	117	9.0
The crew of the Enterprise discovers a crystalline lifeform with murderous intelligence that has been killing the scientists on a terraforming project.
19	19	"Coming of Age"	Mike Vejar	Sandy Fries	March 14, 1988	119	10.1
While Wesley takes a Starfleet Academy entrance exam, the senior staff of the Enterprise are placed under investigation by Starfleet.
20	20	"Heart of Glory"	Rob Bowman	Story by : Maurice Hurley and Herbert Wright & D. C. Fontana; Teleplay by : Maurice Hurley	March 21, 1988	120	10.7
Fugitive Klingons seeking battle attempt to hijack the Enterprise, and ask Worf to join them.
21	21	"The Arsenal of Freedom"	Les Landau	Story by : Maurice Hurley & Robert Lewin; Teleplay by : Richard Manning & Hans Beimler	April 11, 1988	121	10.4
Trapped on the surface of an abandoned planet, an away team becomes unwitting participants in the demonstration of an advanced weapons system.
22	22	"Symbiosis"	Win Phelps	Story by : Robert Lewin; Teleplay by : Robert Lewin and Richard Manning & Hans Beimler	April 18, 1988	123	10.8
Picard tries to mediate a trade dispute between two neighboring planets, one of which is the sole supplier of a drug to treat the other's apparently fatal disease.
23	23	"Skin of Evil"	Joseph L. Scanlan	Story by : Joseph Stefano; Teleplay by : Joseph Stefano & Hannah Louise Shearer	April 25, 1988	122	9.7
An evil, tar-like creature holds Troi hostage on an alien world. During the rescue mission, one of the Enterprise's senior staff is killed.
24	24	"We'll Always Have Paris"	Robert Becker	Deborah Dean Davis & Hannah Louise Shearer	May 2, 1988	124	9.7
Picard meets an old flame, whose husband has been affected by an accident involving a dimensional experiment.
25	25	"Conspiracy"	Cliff Bole	Story by : Robert Sabaroff; Teleplay by : Tracy Tormé	May 9, 1988	125	9.4
The strange behavior of high-ranking officers—which earlier prompted the investigation of the crew (in "Coming of Age")—leads Picard to uncover a conspiracy within Starfleet.
26	26	"The Neutral Zone"	James L. Conway	Story by : Deborah McIntyre & Mona Clee; Teleplay by : Maurice Hurley	May 16, 1988	126	10.2
A derelict satellite is found containing cryonically frozen humans from the 21st century as the Enterprise is sent to investigate the destruction of outposts near Romulan space.

== Home media release ==
The episodes of the first season of The Next Generation had each been released individually and in pairs before being released as a season long box set. This first release came on DVD, but following further work to update the releases into high-definition video and onto Blu-ray disc, "Encounter at Farpoint" was among those episodes included on a preview disc released in January 2012. A full season release on region-free Blu-ray followed at the end of July.

Star Trek: The Next Generation – Season 1
Set details		Special features	
26 episodes; 6-disc set; 1.33:1 aspect ratio; Subtitles: Danish, German, English, Spanish, French, Italian, Dutch, Norwegian, Swedish, English for the hearing impaired; English (Dolby Digital 5.1 Surround), German, Spanish, French and Italian (Dolby Digital 2.0 Surround)		DVD and Blu-ray: Mission Overview: Year One; Selected Crew Analysis: Year One; Departmental Briefing: Year One: Production; Departmental Briefing: Year One: Memorable Missions; Three-part documentary: Inception, Launch, The Continuing Mission; Blu-ray only: Energized! Taking The Next Generation to the Next Level; Star Trek: The Next Generation Archives: The Launch; Introduction to the Series (1987); Stardate Revisited: The Origin of Star Trek: The Next Generation; Season one gag reel; Season one promo; Episodic promos	
Release dates
DVD		Blu-ray	
Region 1	Region 2	United States (Region free)	United Kingdom (Region free)
March 26, 2002; March 12, 2013 (first re-release); June 14, 2016 (second re-release)	April 1, 2002; May 22, 2006 (re-release)	July 24, 2012	August 27, 2012
