= The Battle (Star Trek: The Next Generation) =

- Star Trek: The Next Generation episode
- The USS Stargazer as it appears to the Enterprise after it has performed the Picard Maneuver
- Episode no.: Season 1 Episode 9
- Directed by: Rob Bowman
- Story by: Larry Forrester
- Teleplay by: Herbert Wright
- Cinematography by: Edward R. Brown
- Production code: 110
- Original air date: November 16, 1987

Guest appearances
- Frank Corsentino – Bok; Doug Warhit – Kazago; Robert Towers – Rata

Episode chronology
← Previous "Justice"	Next → "Hide and Q"
- Star Trek: The Next Generation season 1

"The Battle" is the ninth episode of the first season of the American science fiction television series Star Trek: The Next Generation and was originally aired on November 16, 1987, in broadcast syndication. The episode was written by Herbert Wright, based on a story by Larry Forrester, and directed by Rob Bowman.

Set in the 24th century, the series follows the adventures of the Starfleet crew of the Federation starship Enterprise-D. In this episode, Captain Jean-Luc Picard (Patrick Stewart) is given his former vessel, the Stargazer, as a gift by the Ferengi DaiMon Bok (Frank Corsentino) who intends to use it to take revenge upon the Enterprise captain.

The Stargazer was to originally be represented by the movie-era Enterprise model, but producers were convinced to use a design which had appeared on a model in Picard's ready room in the series pilot. Several camera and compositing techniques were used by Bowman in filming the scenes aboard the bridge of the Stargazer, which was also a re-dressed movie-era Enterprise bridge set (which had also been re-dressed to serve as the Enterprise-D “battle bridge” in the pilot episode).

== Plot ==
The Enterprise encounters a Ferengi vessel whose captain, DaiMon Bok, requests a meeting with Captain Picard. Picard is suffering from persistent headaches, whose cause Dr. Beverly Crusher (Gates McFadden) is unable to determine. Meanwhile, a second vessel approaches and is identified as a Federation Constellation-class starship.

Bok transports to the bridge of the Enterprise, and announces that the newly arrived ship is a gift for "the hero of Maxia." Data (Brent Spiner) reminds Picard that nine years earlier at Maxia he was attacked by an unidentified aggressor which he destroyed. Bok reveals that the ship in question was Ferengi. Bok's gift is identified as the Stargazer, Picard's former command, which Bok found as a derelict. Picard explains that at Maxia, the crew was forced to abandon ship, despite winning the battle by an action that would come to be known as the "Picard Maneuver", a short warp jump that caused the enemy vessel's light-speed limited sensors to detect the Stargazer in two places at once.

Picard and an away team board the Stargazer, and he orders a chest of his belongings sent to the Enterprise. Hidden in the chest is an orb, apparently under Bok's control, that subjects Picard to a wave of pain. Dr. Crusher orders him back to the Enterprise. Data finds an entry in the Stargazer's logs stating that the Ferengi were attacked under a flag of truce, but he and La Forge determine that this entry was faked. Wesley detects unusual signals from the Ferengi ship, and the Enterprise computer informs William Riker (Jonathan Frakes) that Picard has returned to the Stargazer.

Picard finds Bok waiting for him with another orb. Bok explains that his son was in command of the Ferengi vessel at Maxia, and that Bok is taking revenge. He sets the orb down and leaves Picard on the Stargazer bridge. The orb lights up, and Picard suddenly believes he is once again at the Battle of Maxia, and that the Enterprise is the attacker. On the Enterprise, Lieutenant Tasha Yar (Denise Crosby) and Lieutenant Worf (Michael Dorn) discover the orb brought over from the Stargazer in Picard's chest. They take it to Riker as the Stargazer powers up its weapon systems. Riker hails the Ferengi vessel and speaks to Kazago, the ship's first officer, who reveals that the orb is a banned device and promises to investigate.

Riker subsequently hails the Stargazer, but Picard continues to believe he is being attacked by the Enterprise. Riker asks Data to devise a countermeasure to the Picard Maneuver. When Picard takes the Stargazer to warp, Data uses the Enterprise's tractor beam to seize the Stargazer and limit its field of fire. Riker tells Picard about the orb; Picard seems to understand and destroys it with his phaser. After a few moments, Picard hails the Enterprise and requests a transport. Kazago hails Riker to inform him that Bok has been relieved of command "for engaging in this unprofitable venture".

== Production ==
"The Battle" marked the second appearance of the Ferengi, but supervising producer Rick Berman thought that they still did not make a decent major adversary. Larry Forester's script, his second for The Next Generation, originally featured several scenes on board the Ferengi ship to cast further light on their culture but they were all ultimately cut before filming. Bok would return in the seventh-season episode "Bloodlines", although the role would be recast with Lee Arenberg gaining the role instead of Frank Corsentino.

Rob Bowman used a couple of specific camera techniques for the scenes on board the Stargazer during Picard's hallucinations. A steadicam attached to a cameraman was used to show a slight unsteadiness, and each of the Stargazer crew members were filmed individually on the bridge against a smoke background before being superimposed together. He explained, "we went dark in a lot of scenes and we did different angles and things the show hadn't done yet. For me, it was a real creative stretch and it felt great for the show." The bridge itself was a re-dress of the film-era Enterprise bridge. The term "Picard Maneuver" was later used offscreen to refer informally to Patrick Stewart's habit of tugging his uniform shirt down, and the Battle of Maxia itself was described in the first chapter of the pre-TNG era novel The Buried Age.

The Constellation-class starship first appears in "Encounter at Farpoint" as a desktop model in Picard's ready room. Rick Sternbach constructed the model by kitbashing Ertl kits of the movie Enterprise, using parts from other models such as the VF-1 Valkyrie to add detail. Greg Jein used Sternbach's and Andrew Probert's designs to create the four-foot shooting model of the USS Stargazer for "The Battle". In the original script, the Stargazer was to be a redress of the movie-era Constitution-class Enterprise model that first appeared in Star Trek: The Motion Picture; Probert and Sternbach persuaded the producers not to reuse the movie Enterprise model, and the "Constellation"-class label was chosen so that it could match LeVar Burton's lip movement to redub dialogue.

== Reception ==
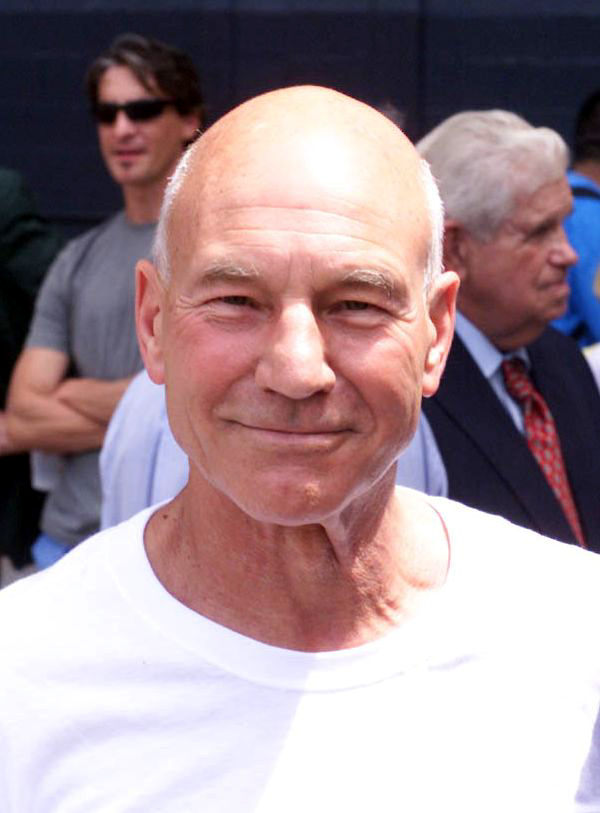
Reviewers and The Next Generation crew praised the performance of Patrick Stewart in "The Battle"

"The Battle" aired in broadcast syndication during the week commencing November 15, 1987. It received Nielsen ratings of 10.5, reflecting the percentage of all households watching the episode during its timeslot. This rating was lower than those received by the episodes broadcast both before and afterwards. Staff writer Maurice Hurley later said that the episode was "pretty good" because of the performance of Patrick Stewart. He originally didn't think much of the episode as it included the Ferengi, who he felt didn't work as an adversary at all.

Several reviewers re-watched the episode after the end of the series. Zack Handlen reviewed the episode for The A.V. Club in April, 2010. He thought that the Ferengi were a "one note" opponent for the crew, but that in this episode they weren't as bad as they were in "The Last Outpost". He thought that the plot made the crew look a little silly, saying, "Put it this way: if somebody showed up at your door and said, "Hey, we want to give you this weapon you used to murder a bunch of guys we knew years ago," wouldn't you be a little suspicious?" He gave the episode an overall mark of C+. James Hunt reviewed the episode for the website "Den of Geek" in November 2012, and said that it was the best episode of the series up until that point. He thought that little touches such as the Stargazer using the movie-era effect for warp drive was a cute touch as it was meant to be an older ship than the Enterprise but also pointed out that "it also means that the Picard Manoeuvre is completely invalidated, because you literally see the ship move from point A to B before the original disappears". He felt that the conflict between Picard and Bok was well realized, and that the characterization was good.

Keith DeCandido re-watched the episode for Tor.com in June 2012, saying that it was a solid episode and that Patrick Stewart did "a stellar job, modulating from pained to confused to nostalgic to frustrated to crazy, all quite convincingly." He said that the downside of the episode was that Troi and Wesley Crusher were not well used, while the revelation of the orb so early in the episode prevented any suspense being built up. He said that the episode worked because it concentrated on Picard, and gave it a score of six out of ten. Jamahl Epsicokhan at his website "Jammer's Reviews" gave the episode two and a half out of four, saying that it was slow-paced but that the storyline had a "psychological component that's sometimes effective". Cast member Wil Wheaton watched "The Battle" for AOL TV in February 2007. He felt that the plot had similar themes to Star Trek II: The Wrath of Khan, in that a father sought revenge following the death of his son. He thought that the writing was weak overall, and that the episode purely worked because of the ability of Patrick Stewart as Captain Picard.

In 2020, Primetimer ranked this one of the top ten episodes for the character Jean-Luc Picard.

== Home media release ==
The first home media release of "The Battle" was on VHS cassette was on July 1, 1992, in the United States and Canada. The episode was later included on the Star Trek: The Next Generation season one DVD box set, released in March 2002, and was released as part of the season one Blu-ray set on July 24, 2012.

== See also ==
- "The Measure of a Man", the second-season episode where Picard encounters the prosecutor from his Stargazer court-martial.
