= The Naked Now =

- Star Trek: The Next Generation episode
- Episode no.: Season 1 Episode 3
- Directed by: Paul Lynch
- Story by: John D. F. Black; J. Michael Bingham
- Teleplay by: J. Michael Bingham
- Cinematography by: Edward R. Brown
- Production code: 103
- Original air date: October 5, 1987

Guest appearances
- Brooke Bundy as Sarah MacDougal; Benjamin W.S. Lum as Jim Shimoda; David Renan as Conn; Michael Rider as Transporter Chief (deleted scene only); Skip Stellrecht as Engineering crewman; Kenny Koch as Kissing crewman

Episode chronology
← Previous "Encounter at Farpoint"	Next → "Code of Honor"
- Star Trek: The Next Generation season 1

"The Naked Now" is the third episode (Note: The series/season premiere, "Encounter at Farpoint", is counted as two episodes.) of the first season of the American science-fiction television series Star Trek: The Next Generation, originally aired on October 5, 1987, in broadcast syndication in the United States. Directed by Paul Lynch, the episode was written by D. C. Fontana, under the pseudonym of "J. Michael Bingham", based on an unfinished teleplay by Gene Roddenberry. It is a sequel to the original series Star Trek episode "The Naked Time" (1966), and that episode's writer John D. F. Black also received a writing credit on this episode for his role in devising the plot's origins.

Set in the 24th century, the series follows the adventures of the Starfleet crew of the Federation starship Enterprise-D. In this episode, the Enterprise crew becomes infected with an illness that causes them to lose their inhibitions and behave irresponsibly, the same affliction suffered by the crew of the previous USS Enterprise decades before in "The Naked Time". Fans initially criticized the origins of the episode, and later reviews were also largely negative.

== Plot ==
The crew of the Enterprise responds to messages received from the SS Tsiolkovsky, a science vessel monitoring the collapse of a supergiant star. The messages suggest, amid their rounds of laughter, that the crew has been exposed to a sudden hull breach. After the Enterprise secures the Tsiolkovsky via tractor beam, an away team beams over and finds that the bridge's emergency hatch was indeed blown, ejecting the bridge crew into space, and the remaining crew frozen to death in various stages of undress, including one who was taking a shower fully clad. A woman's body, frozen, falls into Lt. La Forge's (LeVar Burton) hands. Dr. Crusher (Gates McFadden) orders full medical examinations of the away team on their return, and finds La Forge sweating profusely and complaining about the temperature. She orders him to stay in sickbay, but he wanders out while she is studying his test results, and makes his way to the quarters of Crusher's son, Wesley (Wil Wheaton). Unaware of La Forge's condition, Wesley shows him a portable tractor beam device and La Forge places an encouraging hand on his shoulder. Meanwhile, acting on a hunch by Commander Riker (Jonathan Frakes), who had read up on past starships named Enterprise that included an event involving illness and showering fully dressed, Lt. Cdr. Data (Brent Spiner) locates a historical record identifying the ailment as similar to one encountered by Captain Kirk's USS Enterprise. La Forge returns to sickbay, where Dr. Crusher quickly becomes concerned when she realizes that the infection is spread by physical contact. Many of the ship's crew come under the influence of the ailment, with much sexier results than on Kirk's Enterprise. Most notably, a "fully functional" Data engages in a sexual encounter with Security Chief Tasha Yar (Denise Crosby). Dr. Crusher, struggling against the effects of the ailment, finds the original antidote documented by Kirk's Enterprise to be ineffective, and begins devising a new version of it.

Now infected, Wesley uses a digital sample of Captain Picard's voice to lure key engineering crew members away from the engineering deck. He erects a force field around the area with his tractor beam device and assumes control of the ship. He allows one of the engineers, Mr. Shimoda (Benjamin W.S. Lum), who is acting in a child-like manner, into the force field. Mr. Shimoda manages to remove all of the isolinear chips from the engine control station and plays with them like toys. As the supergiant star collapses, a fragment is blown into a direct impact course with the two Federation ships, and without the chips in place, they cannot move out of its way. Chief Engineer Sarah MacDougal (Brooke Bundy) manages to disable Wesley's force field, and Data is sent to replace the chips. He reports that he will not have enough time. Wesley reverses the ship's tractor beam, repelling the Enterprise off the Tsiolkovsky, giving themselves the necessary additional seconds for Data to replace the chips and enabling the ship to move out of the way. The crew is cured of the ailment, and Picard partially credits Wesley for helping to prevent a disaster.

== Production ==
Star Trek: The Next Generation's creator, Gene Roddenberry, wanted to include an episode revealing the characters' motivations to the audience early on in the series. As a basis, he turned to the Star Trek: The Original Series episode "The Naked Time." Supervising producer Rick Berman described "The Naked Now" as "a homage, not a copy" of "The Naked Time", while director Paul Lynch described it as "slightly more adult and a lot more comic than the original".

"The Naked Now" is based on an incomplete teleplay by Roddenberry for The Next Generation, titled "Revelations". The first few scenes remained largely similar, but in "Revelations", La Forge infected Yar while making unsuccessful sexual advances toward her. In the original series, writer D.C. Fontana wrote a new draft of the teleplay with several further changes that failed to make it into the final installment. These included Data turning down Yar's sexual advances, Troi's lack of privacy due to empathic abilities, Picard's concern for the families on the ship, and Riker's fear of becoming a lonely starship captain.

Brooke Bundy made her only appearance as the first chief engineer of the Enterprise, Sarah MacDougal, in this episode. The post of chief engineer changed hands numerous times through the rest of season one before Geordi La Forge was finally assigned the post on a permanent basis in season two. Michael Rider made his first appearance as an unnamed transporter chief, but his scene was cut in this episode. He went on to appear in the same role twice more before appearing a final time as the same security guard.

The SS Tsiolkovsky model was a redress of the USS Grissom from Star Trek III: The Search for Spock (1984). Michael Okuda created a ship's dedication plaque for the Tsiolkovsky that stated that it had been created in the Soviet Union. A copy was subsequently sent for display at the Konstantin E. Tsiolkovsky State Museum of the History of Cosmonautics in Kaluga, Soviet Russia.

== Reception ==
"The Naked Now" aired in broadcast syndication during the week commencing October 3, 1987. It received Nielsen ratings of 11.5, reflecting the percentage of all households watching the episode during its timeslot. This was lower than the pilot, but higher than the following episodes until "Lonely Among Us" in October 1987.

The initial reaction of some fans was dismay, as concerns arose that The Next Generation would continue to lift stories from the original series. Staff writer Maurice Hurley said of "The Naked Now" "I didn't like that show at all. It just wasn't very good. What it did show, though, was that the new ensemble could interact, and that relationships existed between them that worked, but doing it was terrible. It was a warmed-over premise. Why do it?" The liaison between Data and Yar stood out as being controversial, with Data referring to himself as being "fully functional" in a sexual sense.

Several reviewers rewatched the episode after the end of the series. Keith DeCandido reviewed it on behalf of Tor.com, comparing it to "The Naked Time" and stating "there's nothing in this episode as entertaining as Sulu bare-chested with an epee, and Wesley being nerdy in the engine room is nowhere near as much fun as Riley singing." He gave the episode a score of two out of 10, remarking "it's rarely a good idea to do an episode where everyone acts out of character as only the second one out of the gate, since we don't know enough about these people for their acting strange to be meaningful." Cast member Wil Wheaton rewatched the episode for AOL TV, and summed it up by saying "whether it was the worst episode ever or not probably rested upon the viewer's expectations. Trekkies who were looking for reasons to hate The Next Generation found plenty", while "viewers who were willing to watch it with an open mind saw flashes of things they came to love watching," and gave it a score of D+.

James Hunt wrote about "The Naked Now" for the website Den of Geek, stating that he could not understand why someone would want to show the characters acting out of character in only the second episode (not counting the pilot) of the series, before the viewers had a baseline from which to understand why the characters' behavior was abnormal. He praised the idea of connecting The Next Generation to The Original Series early in the series, but also remarked "however you slice it up, this episode is pretty awful." Jamahl Epsicokhan on his website Jammer's Reviews remarked "there's a certain memorable quality to this episode, despite its campy, overplayed comedy", but that "ultimately, the show is too goofy for its own good, but it's at least not boring," awarding it a score of two and a half out of four.

Writing for TrekNation, Michelle Erica Green thought that the episode would have been improved if it had come a few seasons later, by which time the characters were better known to the audience. She also argued that the plot's synopsis would have worked better had it been used for an episode in Star Trek: Voyager. She thought that the episode was "boring, because we already know how it's going to end, and it's trivial, because already we can see how easily this crew can be diverted from duty." Zack Handlen reviewed "The Naked Now" for The A.V. Club. He gave the episode a grade of D−, and his criticism of the episode included describing the scene with Yar and Data as "colossally misjudged", as well as attacking Wesley Crusher's "twerpitude". CBR ranked the relations between Data and Tasha Yar as one of the top-three "cringe-worthy" relationships on Star Trek, noting that Tasha taking an interest in Data when intoxicated by polywater was uncomfortable.

In 2016, SyFy included this episode in a group of Star Trek franchise episodes they felt were commonly disliked, but "deserved a second chance".

In 2016, the podcast 'The Greatest Generation', hosted by Benjamin Harrison and Adam Pranica, utilise the character Jim Shimoda as they discuss each episode of the series. In each episode the hosts identify their 'Drunk Shimoda', based on criteria including acting strangely, having a lot of fun or behaviour like that of someone inebriated.

In 2019, Screen Rant ranked "The Naked Now" the sixth-funniest episode of Star Trek: The Next Generation.

In 2020, GameSpot noted this episode was one of the most bizarre episodes of the series.

== Home-media release ==
The first home-media release of "The Naked Now" was on VHS cassette, appearing on September 5, 1991, in the United States and Canada. This was followed by a Laserdisc release on October 10, 1991. Episodes from "Encounter at Farpoint" to "Datalore" were released in Japan on LaserDisc on June 10, 1995, as part of First Season Part.1. The episode was later included on the Star Trek: The Next Generation season one DVD box set, released in March 2002, and then released as part of the season one Blu-ray set on July 24, 2012.
