= Worley Thorne =

American screenwriter

Worley Thorne is an American screenwriter, television writer, script consultant and adjunct assistant professor of composition, critical thinking and screenwriting. Thorne's work as a writer encompasses hourlong television drama, and feature film scripts, in a wide variety of genres, including science fiction, fantasy, detective and mystery, legal drama, soap opera, medical drama, animal fiction and family drama.

== Early life ==
Thorne was born in New York City New York, as Roscoe Worley Thorne II, to Gerald Roscoe Thorne, a sometime model, Broadway chorus boy and salesman, and Teri Goldenberg Thorne, a chorus girl and garment samplemaker, who eventually rose through the ranks to become a ladies fashion designer. Gerald had been raised in Indiana by his parents, Dr. Roscoe Worley Thorne I, a physician and Methodist minister and Pearl Garner Thorne. Teri had been born, and spent her teen years in, Benedek-falva, Hungary, to Alexander Goldenberg, a designer-builder of monuments and the village's innkeeper, and Szerena Markovits Goldenberg, daughter of a Jewish rabbi. Thorne was raised in the Bronx, where he attended the Bronx High School of Science, a school for gifted students. He graduated from the City University of New York City College, with a B.A. in English, and in May 2011, received his M.A. with honors in English literature from California State University Northridge. He is married to Patricia Thorne, a poet, fiction, prose, and non-fiction writer who received her M.F.A in creative writing with Honors from Antioch University Los Angeles in 2017. She is published in university periodicals, and has a forthcoming fiction novel soon to be published.

== Career ==
Worley Thorne's work includes scripts for Star Trek: The Next Generation, The Paper Chase, Fantasy Island, Dallas, Barnaby Jones, Cannon, Charlie's Angels, The Life and Times of Grizzly Adams, Doctors' Private Lives and others. He adapted a screenplay in English, based on a French original, titled "Albert's Piano," for Italian producer Marcello Danon (best known for "La Cage Aux Folles.") Other feature film screenplays include "Swift, Silent Deadly" for Becker Productions and "Natural Affection," based on the play by William Inge, for Bassey Productions. His original screenplay "The Yankee," based in the American Revolution, was written for Becker Productions.

Thorne is a past Governor of the Academy of Television Arts and Sciences, the body which determines and gives out Emmy Awards. He is an emeritus member of the Writers Guild of America, west, was chairman of several Guild committees and involved in aiding in organization and supervision of past strikes by the union. Thorne taught screenwriting at Columbia College Hollywood, Los Angeles, for four years, and for several years was a publicist representing entertainment industry, corporate and political clients.

== Credits ==
Paramount Pictures

- Star Trek: The Next Generation:
  - Justice, November 9, 1987 (episode 1.8)
- Star Trek: Phase II
  - Are Unheard Melodies Sweet? (series was unproduced by Paramount, in favor of making motion pictures of Star Trek)

Lorimar Television

- Dallas
  - The Kristin Affair, October 19, 1979 (episode 3.5)
  - Runaway, October 28, 1978 (episode 2.7)

ABC-TV

- Fantasy Island:
  - The Pirate, September 23, 1979 (episode 2.2)
  - I Want to Get Married, October 21, 1978 (episode 2.5)
  - The Swinger, February 9, 1980 (episode 3.19)
  - Crescendo, December 20, 1980 (episode 4.8)
  - The Devil’s Triangle, May 2, 1981 (episode 4.21)
  - To Fly with Eagles, January 21, 1984 #144 (episode 7.12)
- Charlie's Angels:
  - Game Set, Death, January 4, 1978 (episode 2.14)
- Doctors' Private Lives:
  - Buddy System
- Westside Medical:
  - The Sound of Sunlight (debut episode 1.1)
  - Executive Script Consultant for series
- The Swiss Family Robinson:
  - The Captain, November 30, 1975 (episode 1.12)

CBS-TV

- Blade in Hong Kong, Movie, Becker Enterprises, Creative Consultant
- The Paper Chase:
  - The Tables Down at Ernie’s, March 27, 1979 (episode 1.19)
  - Executive Script Consultant for series, Season 1
- The Lazarus Syndrome
- Cannon:
  - The Cure That Kills, February 20, 1974 (episode 3.21)
  - Moving Target January 13, 1973 (episode 2.17)
- Barnaby Jones:
  - The Marathon Murders, February 17, 1977 (episode 5.16)
  - The Lonely Victims, January 8, 1976 (episode 4.16)
- Apple's Way:
  - The Real Thanksgiving, November 24, 1974 (episode 2.10)
  - The Outing, January 5, 1975 (episode 2.14)
  - Executive Script Consultant for series, Season 2

NBC-TV

- The Life and Times of Grizzly Adams
  - Track of the Cougar, December 14, 1977, (episode 2.21)
  - The Seekers January 25, 1978
- The Bionic Woman:
  - Jamie's Mother, March 24, 1976 (episode 1.8)
