= Brooke Bundy =

American actress

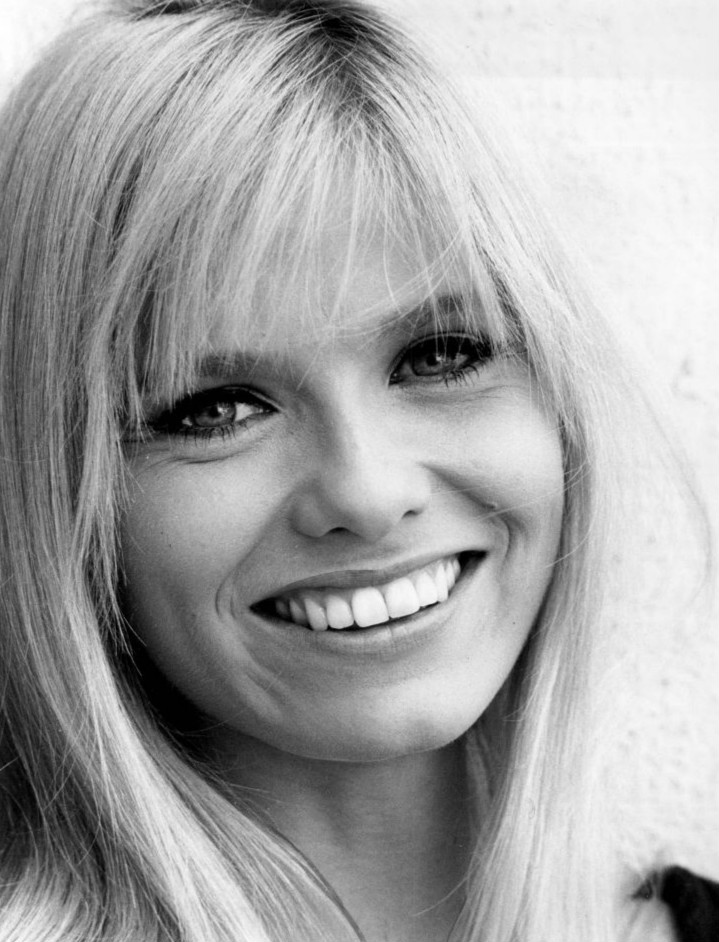
- Bundy in 1967
- Born: August 8, 1944 (age 81)
- Occupation: Actress
- Years active: 1959–2010

Brooke Bundy (born August 8, 1944) is an American film and television actress.

== Early years ==
As a teenager, Bundy was a model in New York before she went to Hollywood on vacation and remained there to become an actress. While in New York, she attended the Professional Children's School.

== Acting career ==
=== Movie ===
She played Elaine Parker in the 1987 hit horror film A Nightmare on Elm Street 3: Dream Warriors and its sequel A Nightmare on Elm Street 4: The Dream Master (1988). Bundy also appeared in Daniel Farrands' documentary film, Never Sleep Again: The Elm Street Legacy.

=== Television ===
Bundy had two long-running roles on the soap opera Days of Our Lives as Rebecca North (1975–77) and General Hospital as Diana Maynard Taylor, RN (1977–81). She made guest appearances on a variety of television shows including The Big Valley, Mr. Novak, Daniel Boone, Lassie (playing Terri Young in season 12, episode 10 "In the Midst of Splendor"), Lancer, Charlie's Angels, The Brady Bunch, The Partridge Family, Medical Center, Gunsmoke, Bonanza, Cannon (season four, episode 17 "The Killer on the Hill"), Barnaby Jones (season two, "Death Leap", 1973), Rawhide, The Virginian, Mission: Impossible (season four, episodes three and four "The Controllers" Part One, Part Two), Mannix, The Mod Squad, McMillan and Wife, Voyage to the Bottom of the Sea, Moonlighting, Gidget, Land of the Lost, Star Trek: The Next Generation (season one, episode "The Naked Now"), Starman (season one, episode 20 - "Starscape" part one), My Three Sons, and The Donna Reed Show. As a stock actress for Jack Webb's production company Mark VII Limited, she appeared as several different characters in shows such as Emergency!, Sierra, and Dragnet.

== TV and filmography ==
- #StopTheNightmare (2020)
- Never Sleep Again: The Elm Street Legacy (2010)
- Without Her Consent (1990)
- Night Visitor (1989)
- Survival Quest (1989)
- A Nightmare on Elm Street 4: The Dream Master (1988)
- A Nightmare on Elm Street 3: Dream Warriors (1987)
- Star Trek: The Next Generation season one, episode two: "The Naked Now" (1987)
- Starman (1986) season one, episode 20 - "Starscape" Part 1
- Stewardess School (1986)
- Explorers (1985)

Simon and Simon A Little Wine with Murder. (1984)

- The Fall Guy (1984) Episode: "The Dead Bounty"
- Madame's Place (1982) Episode: Arlene Hoffman Arrives
- Father Murphy (1982) episode: "The First Miracle", Parts 1 and 2
- The Man in the Santa Claus Suit (1979) (TV movie)
- Crash (1978) (TV movie)
- CHiPs (TV Series) (1977) episode: "Pilot"
- Barnaby Jones (TV Series) (1977) episode: "Anatomy of Fear"
- Wonder Woman (1977) episode: "The Return of Wonder Woman"
- McMillan and Wife (1976) episode: "Greed"
- Moonlighting (1986) episode: "Yours, Very Deadly"
- Police Story (1975) episode: "War Games"
- Land of the Lost (1975) episode: "The Zarn"
- Cannon (1975) episode: "Killer on the Hill"
- Sierra (1974) episode: "Taking Cody Winslow"
- Emergency! (1974) episode: "Communication Gaffe"
- Medical Center (1974) episode: "Midwife"
- The Magician (1974) episode: "The Illusion of the Queen's Gambit"
- The Brady Bunch (1974) episode: "Kelly's Kids"
- The Partridge Family (1973) episode: "Heartbreak Keith"
- Owen Marshall: Counselor at Law (1973) episodes: "The Camerons Are a Special Clan", "Some People in a Park"
- Police Story (1973) episode: "Line of Fire"
- The Mod Squad (1973) episode: "The Night Holds Terror"
- Emergency! (1973) episode: "Alley Cat"
- Night Gallery (1973) episode: "Death on a Barge"
- Barnaby Jones (1973) Ms. Phillips "Death Leap"
- Ghost Story (1973) Holly McCory "Earth, Air, Fire, Water"
- Search (1972) episode: "Moment of Madness"
- Longstreet (1972) episode: "Sad Songs and Other Conversations"
- Emergency! (1972) episode: "Peace Pipe"
- The Rookies (TV series) (1972) episode: "A Bloody Shade of Blue"
- The Mod Squad (1971) season four, episode three: "Home Is the Street"
- Cannon (1971) episode: "Dead Pigeon"
- Medical Center (1971) episode: "Countdown"
- Mannix (1971) episode: "To Save a Dead Man"
- Lassie (1971) episode: "The Awakening"
- My Three Sons (1971) episode: "Debbie"
- Along Came a Spider (1970) (TV movie)
- Dan August (1970) episode: "Epitaph for a Swinger"
- The Interns (1970) episode: " An Afternoon in the Fall"
- The Mod Squad (1970) episode: "Fever"
- Judd for the Defense (1969) episode: "Borderline Girl"
- Lancer (1969) episodes: "The Wedding", "Cut the Wolf Loose"
- Mission Impossible (1969) episode: The Controllers"
- The Gay Deceivers (1969)
- Medical Center (1969) episode: "Thousands and Thousands of Miles"
- The Young Runaways (1968)
- The Mod Squad (1968) pilot and first episode: "The Teeth of the Barracuda"
- The F.B.I. (1968) episode: "Ring of Steel" as Kim
- Firecreek (1968)
- Daniel Boone (1968) episode: "Be Thankful For The Fickleness of Women"
- Dragnet (1968) episode: "The Little Victim"
- Mannix (1967) episode: "Warning: Live Blueberries"
- Judd for the Defense (1967) episode: "A Civil Case of Murder"
- Occasional Wife (1967) episode: "The New Secretary"
- Bonanza (1967) episode: "Judgment at Olympus" as Mary Elizabeth Fuller
- The Big Valley (1967) episode: "The Stallion"
- Cowboy in Africa (1967)
- Chrysler Theatre (1967)
- The Virginian (1966) episode: "The Mark of a Man"
- Gunsmoke (1966) episode: "Sweet Billy, Singer of Songs" as Orabelle Beal
- Run for Your Life (1966) episode: "The Committee for the 25th"
- Lassie (1965) episode: "In the Midst of Splendor"
- Ben Casey (1966) episode: "Lullaby for a Wind-Up Toy"
- Voyage to the Bottom of the Sea (1965) episode: "The Cyborg" as cyborg Gundi
- Gidget (1965) episode: "Gidget's Foreign Policy"
- Burke's Law (1965) episode: "Peace, It's a Gasser"
- Bonanza (1965) episode: "The Debt" as Annie Kane
- Rawhide (1965) episode: "The Winter Soldier"
- Mr. Novak(1964) episodes: "One Monday Afternoon", "The Song of Songs"
- Dr. Kildare (1964) episode: "The Child Between"
- The Virginian (1964) episode: "The Secret of Brynmar Hall"
- The Man from U.N.C.L.E (1964) episode: "The Deadly Games Affair"
- Route 66 (1963) episode: "The Stone Guest"
- Wagon Train (1963) episode: "The Bleecker Story"
- Gunsmoke (1963) episode: "The Magician"
- Mr. Novak (1963) episode: "X Is the Unknown Factor"
- My Three Sons (1963) episodes: "Robbie Wins His Letter", "High on the Hog", "A Car of His Own"
- The Adventures of Ozzie & Harriet (1963) episode: "Torn Dress"
- The Donna Reed Show (1962)
