= Christine Chapel =

Star Trek character

- Star Trek character
- Promotional image of Majel Barrett as Christine Chapel in Star Trek: The Original Series
- First appearance: Majel Barrett: "The Naked Time" (1966); (The Original Series); Jess Bush: "Strange New Worlds" (2022); (Star Trek: Strange New Worlds)
- Created by: Gene Roddenberry
- Portrayed by: Majel Barrett (1966–1986); Jess Bush (2022–present)
- Voiced by: Majel Barrett (Star Trek: The Animated Series); Jess Bush ("Those Old Scientists")

In-universe information
- Full name: Christine Chapel
- Species: Human
- Title(s): Nurse; Doctor; Commander
- Affiliation: United Federation of Planets; Starfleet
- Significant others: Roger Korby (ex-fiancé; deceased); Spock (love interest)
- Origin: Earth

Christine Chapel is a fictional Starfleet nurse and later physician in the Star Trek franchise. Originally portrayed by Majel Barrett and later by Jess Bush, she appears in all three seasons of Star Trek: The Original Series, Star Trek: The Animated Series, the films Star Trek: The Motion Picture and Star Trek IV: The Voyage Home, and Star Trek: Strange New Worlds. Bush portrays a younger version of the character in Strange New Worlds, where Chapel has a substantially expanded role.

In The Original Series, Chapel serves as the head nurse of the Starfleet starship USS Enterprise under Dr. Leonard McCoy. She joins Starfleet while searching for her missing fiancé, Dr. Roger Korby, and develops unrequited feelings for Spock. By the time of The Motion Picture, she has become a Starfleet physician, and in The Voyage Home she is assigned to Starfleet Command. In Strange New Worlds, Chapel is depicted earlier in her career as an ambitious nurse and veteran of the Klingon War.

Barrett was originally cast by series creator Gene Roddenberry as Number One in the rejected Star Trek pilot "The Cage". After she was dropped from the second pilot, Roddenberry created the role of Christine Chapel, allowing Barrett to return as a recurring cast member while also voicing the Enterprise computer. Bush assumed the role when the character returned for Strange New Worlds in 2022.

The character has received mixed critical and fan responses. Barrett's portrayal and Chapel's unrequited love for Spock drew criticism from some writers and reviewers, who regarded the character as underdeveloped and constrained by gender stereotypes, while her promotion to doctor and Bush's portrayal in Strange New Worlds have been praised.

== Concept and development ==
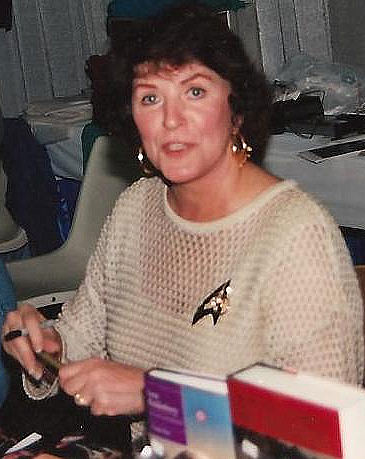
Majel Barrett (pictured in 2007) originally met Gene Roddenberry while he was developing pilots for Screen Gems.

Prior to working on Star Trek, Gene Roddenberry had been developing a variety of television pilots for Screen Gems. One actress he auditioned was Majel Leigh Hudec, later to use the name Majel Barrett. Later when he created the drama series The Lieutenant, he cast her in the episode "In the Highest Tradition". They quickly became friends, and entered into a romantic relationship although Roddenberry was married at the time. During the development of the first pilot for Star Trek: The Original Series ("The Cage"), Roddenberry wrote the part of Number One (the ship's second in command) specifically for Barrett. There was reluctance from the NBC executives to agree to an actress who was almost unknown. Roddenberry did see other actresses for the part, but no one else was considered.

Executive producer Herbert Franklin Solow attempted to sell them on the idea that a fresh face would bring believability to the part, but they were aware that she was Roddenberry's girlfriend. Despite this they agreed to her casting, not wanting to upset Roddenberry at this point in the production. After the pilot was rejected, a second pilot was produced. While it was generally explained that the network disliked a female character as the second-in-command of the Enterprise, Solow had a different opinion of events. He said, "No one liked her acting... she was a nice woman, but the reality was, she couldn't act." "Where No Man Has Gone Before" successfully took Star Trek to a series order. Barrett had been given the role of voicing the computer on the USS Enterprise, but was demanding that Roddenberry write her into the main cast.

After seeing the initial proposal for "What Are Little Girls Made Of?", Barrett felt that she could play the woman who went into space to find her fiancé. She dyed her hair blonde in an attempt to fit the role. Barrett sought to surprise Roddenberry at his office, but he walked right past her, not recognizing who she was. It was only when he came back out to give his secretary some papers that he realized it was Barrett. They had the idea that it might get her past the NBC executives and back onto the show. The character of Christine Ducheaux was subsequently changed to Christine Chapel by Roddenberry, as a play on the Sistine Chapel. No other actresses were considered for the role.

At the same time, story editor John D.F. Black wrote the initial script for "The Naked Time", also early in the first season. The story featured a virus being transmitted among the ship's crew, which removed their inhibitions. One element of Black's story featured the addition of a nurse in sickbay, working with Doctor Leonard McCoy. Chapel was written into both these episodes by Roddenberry. The deception did not work, with NBC executive Jerry Stanley commenting simply "Well, well – look who's back" to Solow. Roddenberry saw to it that the character of Christine Chapel would become a recurring one throughout the series, on-par with Uhura. She remained unsatisfied with the role, but appreciated that since NBC had already fired her once, Roddenberry could not expand the role.

For Star Trek: The Animated Series, Barrett was initially set to reprise the role of Chapel as well as voicing Uhura. Likewise James Doohan was to voice both his own Scotty as well as Hikaru Sulu. However, following the intervention of Leonard Nimoy, Nichelle Nichols and George Takei were both brought back to voice their own characters. Barrett returned in Star Trek: The Motion Picture as Chapel, which she described as a "very minimal role", saying that "If no one had called me Commander Chapel, the audience wouldn't really know that I was there." Barrett said in the film franchise Chapel got lost along the way, not appearing in the second or third films despite her view that she was a main character in The Original Series. Nimoy brought back Chapel for Star Trek IV: The Voyage Home, and Barrett was grateful for his decision. Chapel was subsequently mentioned in the 2009 film Star Trek, which saw the characters from The Original Series re-cast. Chapel was one of the suggested possibilities for Alice Eve to play in the sequel, Star Trek Into Darkness. It was later revealed that she was portraying Carol Marcus.

In Star Trek: Strange New Worlds the Chapel character returned to the franchise, this time played by Australian actress Jess Bush. Bush chooses not to use her native Australian accent for the performance, a choice she states that helps her get into character physically and mentally.

In speaking with The Daily Beast in mid-2023 about Star Trek: Strange New Worlds' LGBTQ+ representation—and her portrayal of a bisexual character—Bush unhesitatingly told the interviewer, "I'm queer". Bush said about the role: "I am so delighted that there's more representation for all expressions of sexuality and gender in Star Trek. That’s really exciting to me, and I’m really proud to be a part of that representation."

In 2022 Bush was nominated for her role for a Saturn Award for Best Supporting Actress in a Streaming Television Series.

== Appearances ==
In "What Are Little Girls Made Of?", it is explained that Chapel abandoned a career in bioresearch for a position in Starfleet. She had hoped that this would reunite her with her fiancé Dr. Roger Korby (Michael Strong), incommunicado following his expedition to the planet Exo III. Five years after Korby's disappearance, Chapel is assigned to the USS Enterprise where she serves as head nurse, working under Dr. McCoy (DeForest Kelley).

While on board the ship, she begins to develop feelings for Spock (Leonard Nimoy), admitting as much in "The Naked Time". Her actions in that episode resulted in the Psi 2000 intoxication unwittingly being further spread among the crew. The ship reached Exo III in "What Are Little Girls Made Of?". Captain Kirk (William Shatner) and Chapel beam down and discover Korby had been exploiting a sophisticated android manufacturing technology on the planet. After Chapel is horrified to find out that Korby had transplanted his personality into an android replica, he kills himself in despair. Roddenberry later co-wrote in The Making of Star Trek that the actions of that episode resulted in Chapel breaking her ties to Earth and devoting herself to Starfleet service.

After Korby's death, Chapel doubts if she should stay aboard but elects to remain with the Enterprise throughout the five-year mission. Chapel's feelings for Spock were revisited and alluded to only a few times in the series, most notably in "Plato's Stepchildren". In the episode, the Platonians telekinetically force Chapel and Spock to kiss passionately. This humiliates Chapel despite her long-standing feelings for him. In the episode "Amok Time", she brings Spock some soup to help him through a sacred Vulcan ritual, the Pon farr. He angrily refuses the soup and throws it at the wall, but later thanks Chapel for her thoughtfulness.

Chapel appeared in two of the Star Trek films featuring The Original Series cast. In Star Trek: The Motion Picture, Chapel had become a doctor on board the Enterprise. Her second appearance was in Star Trek IV: The Voyage Home, where she and Janice Rand (Grace Lee Whitney) were stationed in Starfleet Headquarters in San Francisco. In the 2009 film Star Trek, a Nurse Chapel is mentioned by McCoy (Karl Urban). In the 2013 film Star Trek Into Darkness, Carol Marcus (Alice Eve) tells Kirk (Chris Pine) that after being with him, Chapel left to become a nurse.

Since the start of the Star Trek: Strange New Worlds series in 2022, the Chapel character has appeared in all but one of the episodes in the first two seasons.

== Reception ==
=== Cast and crew ===
Executive producer Robert H. Justman did not care for Chapel; he described her as a "wimpy, badly written, and ill-conceived character". He added that the additional camera lenses used by director Jerry Finnerman in that episode for close-ups of her quivering lip only "served to emphasize the lack of character written into the character." He had complained to Roddenberry of Barrett's acting skills, but stopped when he became aware of their relationship. It was only after Barrett's first appearance as Lwaxana Troi in the Star Trek: The Next Generation episode "Haven", that he came to realize that it was the Chapel character he disliked, not Barrett herself, and told her that his opinion had changed. Barrett also did not care for the character of Chapel, saying "I've never been a real aficionado of Nurse Chapel, I figured she was kind of weak and namby-pamby."

Writer David Gerrold, who worked with the staff of The Original Series following his work on the episode "The Trouble with Tribbles", described Chapel as being one of a second-tier set of characters including Uhura, Scotty, and Sulu, who were not given as much exposure during the series as the main characters of Kirk, Spock, and McCoy. He said that she was the only one of the second level of characters whose motivations were explored, but her primary focus on board the ship was simply to be in love with Spock. Gerrold said that there was a need to demonstrate the "aloofness" of the Vulcan character, and so this resulted in a character whose love of him needed to be rebuffed, thus giving Chapel her purpose. He suggested that this caused the fandom to dislike Chapel because "female fans saw her as a threat to their own fantasies and male fans saw her as a threat to Spock's Vulcan stoicism". Gerrold added that those fans were surprised when they met Barrett at science fiction conventions, as they found her likable in person. By the time of the 2009 film Star Trek, Chapel had become more popular among fans, who were asking if she would appear in the new films.

=== Critical reception ===
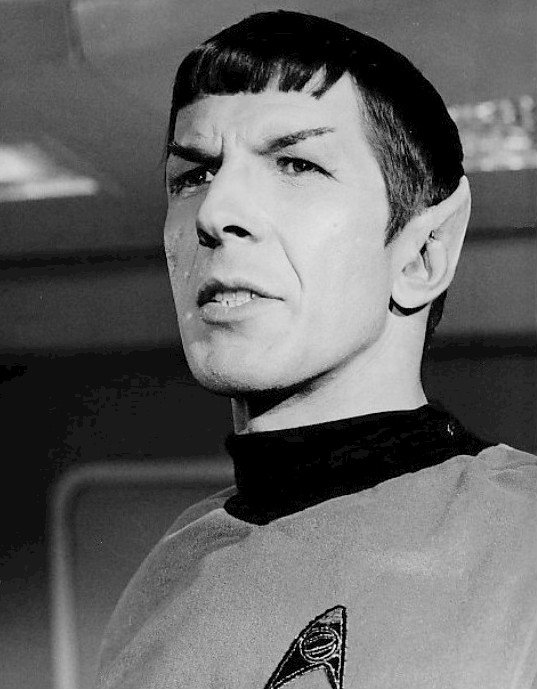
Chapel's feelings for Spock (pictured) have been both criticized and praised by critics and disliked by some fans.

In her essay "The Audience as Auteur. Women, Star Trek and 'Vidding'" in the book Gene Roddenberry's Star Trek: The Original Cast Adventures, Francesca Coppa said that she saw the switch from Number One to Chapel for Barrett as "degradation on every level: role, status and image". The role was described as "consolation" in Cary O'Dell's book June Cleaver Was a Feminist!: Reconsidering the Female Characters of Early Television, but it was felt that Barrett "made the most of it". The position of a nurse was described by O'Dell as a traditional female role, but that Chapel would stand up to McCoy's orders when required. Her promotion to Doctor in The Motion Picture was praised by author Gladys L. Knight in her book Female Action Heroes: A Guide to Women in Comics, Video Games, Film, and Television.

Reviewers were critical of her relationship with Spock. Jan Johnson-Smith described Chapel in American Science Fiction TV as "a woman condemned to forever lust after the elusive Vulcan" and said that she is one of several female characters in the series who are "depicted as recognizable stereotypes". Coppa also discussed this, describing Chapel as a typical damsel in distress, existing "merely to pine". But the relationship was also seen positively. Torie Atkinson, at Tor.com, said that Chapel's affection in "Amok Time" is "so transparent and sweet". In The Making of Star Trek by Roddenberry and Stephen E. Whitfield, her feelings toward Spock are said to not be unique since they are shared by many of the female crew on board the Enterprise. It is also further explained that McCoy is aware of her feelings but displays "fatherly affection" towards her and never "chides" her for this.

Commenting on her appearances in further episodes, Wei Ming Dariotis was critical of the single-mindedness of the plot for "Amok Time" in not allowing Spock to have sex with Chapel, or any other woman, and thus solve the problem of his Pon farr. Eugene Myers at Tor.com praised Chapel, saying that the most interesting part of "What Are Little Girls Made Of?" was that it was based primarily on her, while Keith DeCandido said that this resulted in the episode being the "Kirk-and-Chapel show" to the detriment of the other characters.

In 2016, Nurse Christine Chapel was ranked as the 60th most important character of Starfleet within the Star Trek science fiction universe by Wired magazine, out of 100 characters.

Heavy described Jess Bush's latest interpretation of the character as "very different [...] fun, irreverent, and a bit of a live wire". On the difference between her own portrayal of Chapel and Barrett's, Bush said: "I think that when I watched Majel's performance, what I distilled most from that, what I took from that, was her candor and her humor and her wit. But those things were just little seedlings. In the 2021 rebirth of her, there's so much more to her, I think. [...] She's got this lust for life and this mischievous nature that I love to embody. She's been through some stuff, actually."
