= Justice (Star Trek: The Next Generation) =

- Star Trek: The Next Generation episode
- Episode no.: Season 1 Episode 8
- Directed by: James L. Conway
- Story by: Worley Thorne; Ralph Wills
- Teleplay by: Worley Thorne
- Cinematography by: Edward R. Brown
- Production code: 109
- Original air date: November 9, 1987

Guest appearances
- Brenda Bakke – Rivan; Jay Louden – Liator; Josh Clark – Conn; David Q. Combs – First Mediator; Richard Lavin – Second Mediator; Judith Jones – Edo Girl; Eric Matthew – First Edo Boy; Brad Zerbst – Medical Technician; David Michael Graves – Second Edo Boy

Episode chronology
← Previous "Lonely Among Us"	Next → "The Battle"
- Star Trek: The Next Generation season 1

"Justice" is the eighth episode of the first season of the American science fiction television series Star Trek: The Next Generation. The episode first aired in broadcast syndication on November 9, 1987. It was directed by James L. Conway. Writer John D. F. Black originally pitched the story, but after Worley Thorne and Gene Roddenberry modified it, Thorne wrote the script. Because of the changes to the story, Black chose to receive his credit under the pseudonym Ralph Wills.

Set in the 24th century, the series follows the adventures of the Starfleet crew of the Federation starship Enterprise-D. In this episode, Wesley Crusher (Wil Wheaton) is sentenced to death after inadvertently breaking the law on an alien planet. Captain Jean-Luc Picard (Patrick Stewart) must deal with the powerful and mysterious protector of the planet while deliberating whether to violate the Prime Directive to save Wesley's life.

This was the first episode of The Next Generation to feature multiple shots filmed on location, with scenes filmed in Van Nuys, Los Angeles, and the Huntington Library in San Marino, California. "Justice" was the second most viewed episode of the first season, with 12.7 million viewers. However, on review, the episode received many negative responses, with critics pointing to issues with the quality of the acting and plot.

== Plot ==
The USS Enterprise arrives for shore leave at the paradisiacal, newly discovered planet of Rubicun III. A small advance party from the ship are sent down to meet with the Edo, the native people of the planet. Captain Jean-Luc Picard (Patrick Stewart) sends Wesley Crusher (Wil Wheaton) as part of the away team to evaluate the planet on behalf of the young people on board the Enterprise. Upon their arrival, they are greeted by Rivan (Brenda Bakke) and Liator (Jay Louden) in a very comfortable way, prompting Lt. Worf (Michael Dorn) to determine it a "nice planet", while Wesley leaves the adults to socialize with native teenagers. On the Enterprise, Lt. Commander Data (Brent Spiner) reports something unusual orbiting the planet, but nothing appears on the viewscreen. He sends out a communications signal which reveals another vessel in orbit. A small ball of light enters the bridge and communicates with Picard in a booming voice, warning him not to interfere with the Edo, calling them his "children". The intruder then incapacitates Data.

On Rubicun III, the Edo explain to Lt. Tasha Yar (Denise Crosby) and Worf that capital punishment is used to enforce their laws. The away team rush to warn Wesley, only to discover he has accidentally broken a greenhouse while playing catch with the Edo youths. An Edo mediator, or policeman, attempts to give Wesley a lethal injection for this infraction of the law, but Yar and Worf draw their phasers. On the ship, the sphere leaves Data's body and departs. Picard, upon hearing of the situation with Wesley, transports to the surface. He meets with representatives of the Edo in a council chamber and explains that Earth no longer practices capital punishment. Some Edo interpret this stance as an attempt by the Federation to push their superiority and suggest that Picard should mount a rescue effort for the boy. He says he cannot, quoting the Prime Directive.

Picard asks about the mysterious vessel in orbit and discovers that the Edo worship it as a god. He returns to his ship with Rivan and Counsellor Deanna Troi (Marina Sirtis). Rivan sees the strange ship from orbit and confirms it is the Edo's god. She is transported back to the surface when the ship threatens the Enterprise for taking her away from the planet, and that the captain and the rest of the ship must now share Wesley's fate according to the Edo code. Data reveals that, while he was in communication with the entity, it will protect the Edo as if they were its children. After considering their options, Picard returns to the planet's surface and announces that he is willing to risk the wrath of the entity. He orders the transportation of Wesley to the Enterprise, but the entity disables the transporters and again threatens to destroy the rest of the ship. Picard has had enough, and pleads with the Edo god that laws must allow for exceptions to ensure justice, and after this statement the transporters go back online, allowing the away team to return. Upon leaving the planet, Picard communicates with the entity to inform it that they are leaving and that they will remove recently placed colonists at a nearby star system under the entity's claimed jurisdiction, if the entity expresses so. However, the final offer was refused as the entity informs Picard to steer clear of the Edo before disappearing. Picard regrets they did not communicate more, and the Enterprise departs.

== Production ==
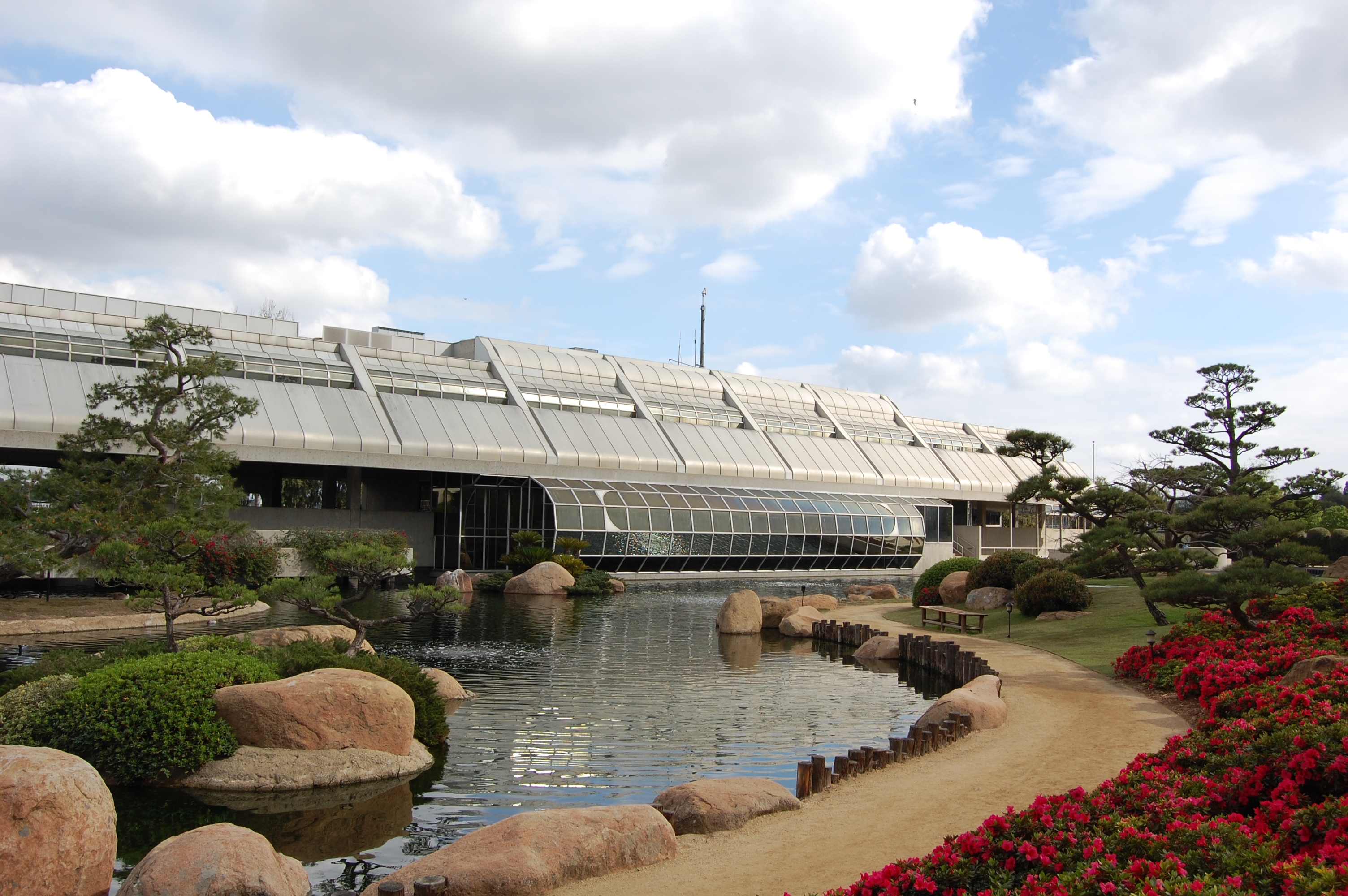
Garden path, pond, and administrative building of the Tillman Water Reclamation Plant which has been used for various planets during Star Trek: The Next Generation

John D. F. Black's original pitch featured a story about capital punishment. His idea was based on a film treatment detailing the colony planet of Llarof where capital punishment is handed down as a sentence for any offense except against those who are immune from the law. In the treatment, a security officer is killed by a local law enforcement officer, who is then killed himself by his partner for unjustly killing the Enterprise crewman. The planet would have had a rebel faction who wanted to overthrow the laws, which Picard refused to back initially while citing the Prime Directive. A second draft featured a rebel leader executed for treason. Black explained the premise of a society that developed laws to prevent terrorism and chaos: "Let's say that what we do is kill everybody who is a terrorist or suspected of being a terrorist. Now the people who have killed everybody, what do they do?"

The idea was re-written by the show's creator Gene Roddenberry and writer Worley Thorne. It was Roddenberry and Thorne who created the godlike entity and sexed up the Edo. James L. Conway directed the episode, having just finished the MacGyver episode, "Jack in the Box". Josh Clark, who plays a Conn officer in "Justice", later appears as Lt. Joe Carey in all seven seasons of Star Trek: Voyager.

"Justice" is the first episode of Star Trek: The Next Generation filmed mostly on location, and the first of any scenes on location other than those set in the holodeck in "Encounter at Farpoint". Scenes shot at The Japanese Garden (Tillman Water Reclamation Plant) in Van Nuys, Los Angeles, were located under the flight path for the Van Nuys Airport. The noise from overhead planes was so loud, the actors were required to re-record their lines in the studio. Filming for the scene where Wesley crashes into the greenhouse occurred on the grounds of the Huntington Library (Note: An indirect reference to the Huntington Library shows up again in the third season episode, "Hollow Pursuits". In a holodeck program, Wesley is dressed as a man in Thomas Gainsborough's oil painting, The Blue Boy (c. 1770). This painting is held by the Huntington Library.) in San Marino, California. The Tillman Water Reclamation Plant was so successful as a shooting location, it was re-used for production in the episode "The First Duty" and several more times as a shooting location for other shows including Star Trek: Deep Space Nine.

== Reception ==
"Justice" first aired in first-run syndication on November 8, 1987. It received Nielsen ratings of 12.7 million, placing it in third place in the timeslot. It ranked the second highest viewed episode of the first season, after the premiere "Encounter at Farpoint", which was seen by 15.7 million viewers.

Several reviewers re-watched the episode after the end of the series. Castmember Wil Wheaton watched "Justice" for AOL TV in December 2006. He observed problems with his acting and the plot development, particularly where Picard transports the Edo woman to the Enterprise. Wheaton felt Picard's actions were a clear breach of the Prime Directive which was otherwise at the heart of the episode. On the other hand, he thought the episode showed a proper dynamic between Picard and the bridge crew, and he believed it tackled a real ethics problem in a manner more frequently seen in the 2004 Battlestar Galactica television series. Wheaton gave the episode of "Justice" a grade of B+.

Keith DeCandido reviewed the episode for Tor.com in May 2011. He said the episode "collapses under the weight of its own ridiculousness", and he criticized the Edo as caricatures. DeCandido thought that the plot involving Wesley was predictable, but that the scripting for Picard helped to cement him as a "great character". He gave the episode a score of two out of ten. James Hunt reviewed the episode for Den of Geek in November 2012. He liked the central idea, but said it was typical of the poor quality of the early episodes of the series. Hunt also thought multiple plot details were not addressed, such as the origin of the alien entity and the reason for the Edo's fear of it. Jamahl Epsicokhan for his website Jammer's Reviews, said that the episode featured "yet another Trek-clichéd Infinitely Superior Life Form", and featured a debate which was "more obtuse than enlightening". He gave it a score of one out of four.

In 2018, CBR included this episode in a list of Star Trek episodes that are "so bad they must be seen." WhatCulture ranked this episode the 16th worst episode of Star Trek. In 2019, ScreenRant ranked it the 7th worst episode of Star Trek: The Next Generation based on IMDB ratings, which was 6 out of 10 at that time.

== Home media release ==
"Justice" was first released on VHS cassette in the United States and Canada on July 1, 1992. Episodes from "Encounter at Farpoint" to "Datalore" were released in Japan on LaserDisc on June 10, 1995, as part of First Season Part.1. This included the first season episode "Justice", and the box set has a total runtime of 638 minutes across multiple 12-inch optical video discs. The episode was later included on the Star Trek: The Next Generation season one DVD box set, released in March 2002. The episode was released as part of the season one Blu-ray set on July 24, 2012. The Blu-Ray features the episode in 1080p video format with 7.1 DTS-HD Master Audio.
