= Lonely Among Us =

- Star Trek: The Next Generation episode
- Episode no.: Season 1 Episode 7
- Directed by: Cliff Bole
- Story by: Michael Halperin
- Teleplay by: D.C. Fontana
- Cinematography by: Edward R. Brown
- Production code: 108
- Original air date: November 2, 1987

Guest appearances
- John Durbin – Ssestar; Colm Meaney – Transporter Chief; Kavi Raz – Assistant Chief Engineer Singh

Episode chronology
← Previous "Where No One Has Gone Before"	Next → "Justice"
- Star Trek: The Next Generation season 1

"Lonely Among Us" is the seventh episode of the American science fiction television series Star Trek: The Next Generation, which originally aired on November 2, 1987, in broadcast syndication in the United States. It was written by D. C. Fontana, based on a story by Michael Halperin. It was the first episode of The Next Generation to be directed by Cliff Bole.

Set in the 24th century, the series follows the adventures of the crew of the Federation starship Enterprise-D. In this episode, as the ship is en route to an interplanetary conference with delegates from the Selay and Antican races on board, a non-corporeal alien entity takes possession of various Enterprise crew members, including Captain Jean-Luc Picard (Patrick Stewart).

This episode marked the first appearance of Star Trek: Deep Space Nine recurring cast member Marc Alaimo in a Star Trek series, as well as the second appearance of Colm Meaney who would later play The Next Generation and Deep Space Nine character Miles O'Brien. The Antican and Selay make-up was created by Michael Westmore from designs by Andrew Probert. Following the airing of the episode, fans wrote in to complain about a scene referencing cannibalism. Reviews were mostly negative, with criticism directed at the writing in particular.

== Plot ==
The Enterprise is en route to the planet "Parliament" with delegates from two warring planets in the Beta Renner system, the reptilian Selay and the canine Antican, when the ship encounters a strange energy cloud. Unseen by the crew, Lt. Worf (Michael Dorn) is hit with a strange energy discharge as the ship passes the cloud, causing him to become violent. Doctor Beverly Crusher (Gates McFadden) sedates Worf and brings him to the sick bay, but is also infused with the energy as she examines his body. Crusher begins to act oddly, although not violently, to those around her and goes to the bridge, asking questions about the ship's navigational functions. When she questions Lt. Cdr. Data (Brent Spiner) at one of the science stations, the energy sparks between her and the console, leaving her confused as to why she is on the bridge.

The ship suddenly begins to malfunction and Captain Picard sends Assistant Engineer Singh (Kavi Raz) to investigate the cause. Singh is later found dead, after the energy goes into him, near a computer link, and Picard orders a murder investigation, considering the alien delegates to be prime suspects. Data investigates the murder in the manner of fictional detective Sherlock Holmes, and determines that the delegates were not responsible. Meanwhile, Counselor Deanna Troi (Marina Sirtis) uses hypnosis on both Worf and Crusher, finding that both recall being invaded by some entity during their blackouts. The ship suddenly drops out of warp for a second time and as Picard investigates the readouts at a bridge console, the strange energy transfers into him. The bridge crew becomes suspicious of Picard's actions after noting that all Enterprise systems are back to normal and that Picard has ordered them to return to the cloud.

The senior officers attempt to plead with Picard to undergo a medical examination and to step down from command, but he refuses. When they return to the cloud, Picard announces that they had picked up an entity previously when they passed the cloud, and now Picard and the entity are one. Under its influence, Picard plans to transport his energy back into the cloud, and he shoots energy at the bridge crew when they try to stop him. The crew are unable to prevent Picard from beaming off the ship. The crew spend hours trying to locate Picard to no avail, so they are forced to accept he is beyond recovery and prepare to leave. However, Troi senses the Captain's essence nearby, and Picard manages to signal the crew through the ship's computers. Data is able to reverse the transport, reconstituting Picard without the entity. After determining that Picard is himself again, lacking the memories since he was taken over by the entity, the Enterprise continues on to Parliament.

== Production ==
=== Writing and casting ===
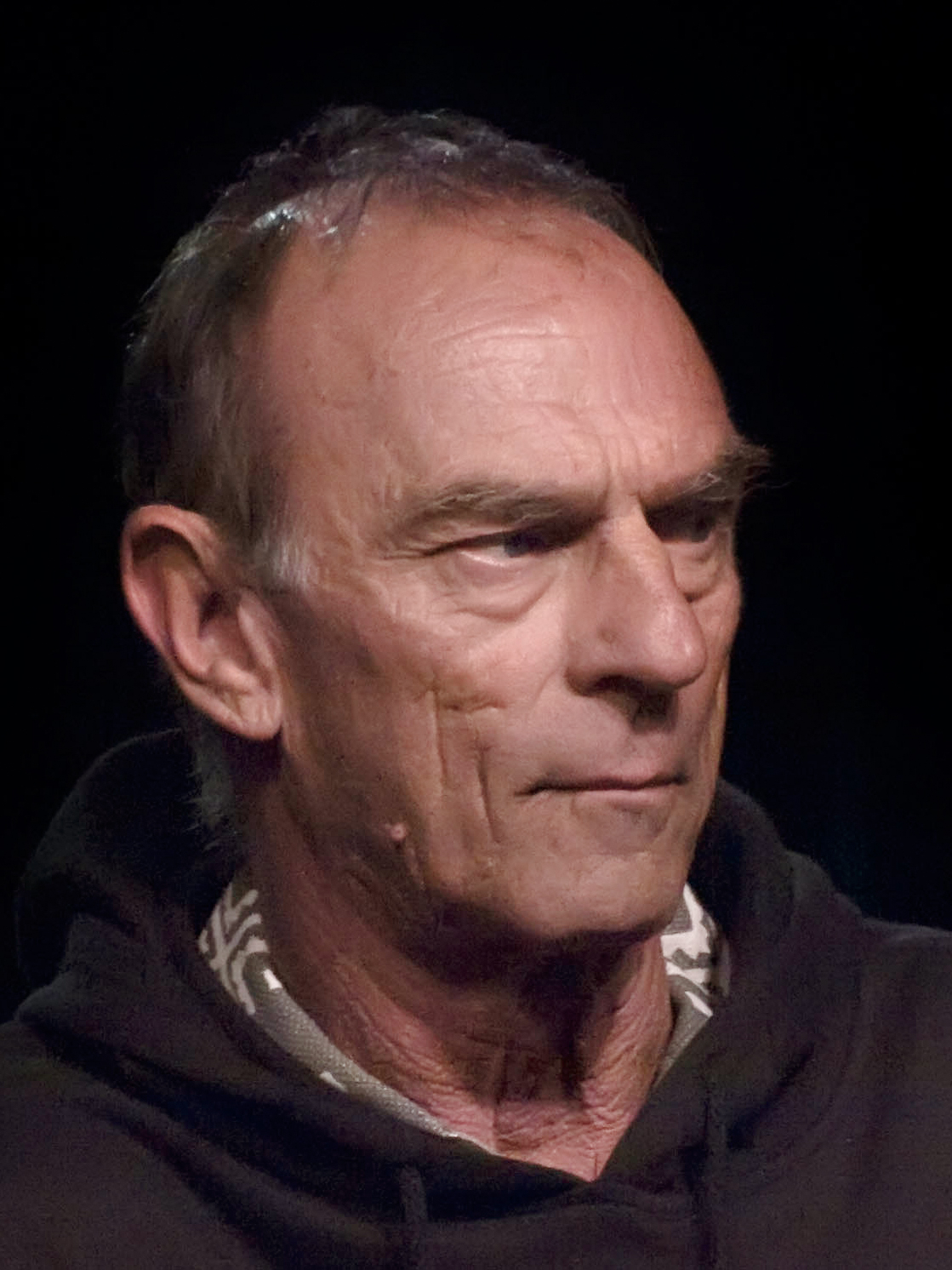
Marc Alaimo made his Star Trek debut with "Lonely Among Us".

The original story by Michael Halperin contained a different subplot involving a problem with the dilithium in the warp drive of the Enterprise. The diplomatic conference was added by D.C. Fontana when it was developed into a teleplay. Fontana had previously worked on Star Trek: The Original Series, including the episode "Journey to Babel". "Lonely Among Us" was subsequently compared to "Journey to Babel", which Fontana denied, saying, "I wrote 'Journey to Babel' and I wrote this too, and I feel there is a difference. There's a definite delineation and separation here, both in intent and content." Director Cliff Bole did not recall much of the episode later, but did not think much of the script, saying "The subject matter affects the end product. There's some better written shows, obviously." It was the first episode of The Next Generation to be directed by Bole, who had previously worked on shows such as V and The Six Million Dollar Man.

Colm Meaney made his second appearance in The Next Generation after he originally appeared in the pilot, "Encounter at Farpoint", as a conn ensign on the bridge. In this episode he played a security ensign, as it was not until season two that he began to play the recurring character of Miles O'Brien, who would later become a series regular on Star Trek: Deep Space Nine. Another Deep Space Nine actor who made his first Trek appearance in this episode was Marc Alaimo, who played an Antican who was unnamed on screen, but referred to in the script as Badar N'D'D. Alaimo went on to play several other roles in The Next Generation including as the Cardassian Gul Macet in "The Wounded", before being cast as Gul Dukat in DS9. John Durbin appeared as the Selay leader, and would also go on to appear as a Cardassian later in the series, as Gul Lemec in "Chain of Command". Kavi Raz played Assistant Engineer Singh, although as he was unavailable for a re-shoot, in one scene he was replaced by a wig on a chair.

=== Make-up and costuming ===
The Selay and the Anticans were nicknamed the "snakes and the dogs" by the production staff. The designs were created by Andrew Probert, who had previously been responsible for the design of the Enterprise-D. The makeup used on them was created by supervisor Michael Westmore, which involved full headpieces and hands for two Anticans and five Selays. Because of the limited space available, the Anticans were made internally in the Paramount makeup studio while the Selays were outsourced to a different studio to sculpt the head. Once completed, a mold was made of the Selay head and the unpainted pieces were cast in latex and sent to Westmore to complete. It was intended to cast them out of lightweight polyurethane, but the first batch of Selay heads came out very heavy.

Westmore had time to re-cast two of the heads from soft foam rubber, but as each took five hours to make, there was not enough time to re-make all five. The heavier versions of the Selay heads were worn by actors in the background of the scenes, although Westmore described them as being "very uncomfortable". The Antican mask did not allow for any movement at all with the exception of the actors being able to poke their tongues through the mouth opening. Although this is the only major appearance of either the Anticans or the Selay, they continued to be used as background extras in other episodes of The Next Generation and Deep Space Nine. Westmore repainted the Selay masks prior to reusing them in order to give the scales more of a three-dimensional look.

This was the first appearance of The Next Generation era Starfleet dress uniforms. They were based on those used by the Royal Navy in the 18th century but would be slightly altered when they re-appeared during season two. One piece of a costume introduced in this episode which never returned was the surgical cap and eyepiece worn by Doctor Crusher.

== Reception ==
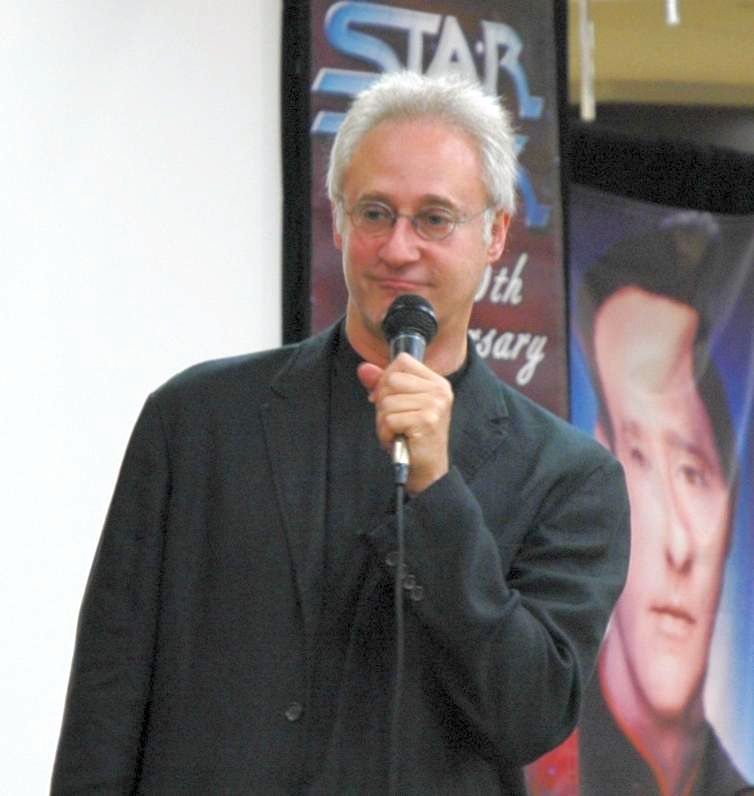
Brent Spiner received both positive and negative reviews for his Sherlock Holmes impression while portraying Data in this episode.

"Lonely Among Us" originally aired in first-run syndication on November 2, 1987. It received a 12.1 rating, meaning that it was seen by 12.1 percent of all households. This was an increase from the previous week's "Where No One Has Gone Before" which received a rating of 10.5.

Following the broadcast, the producers received a significant amount of mail from fans criticising the apparent cannibalism on the part of the Anticans in this episode. Several reviewers rewatched the episode following the end of the series. Keith DeCandido reviewed "Lonely Among Us" for Tor.com in May 2011. He gave it a score of three out of ten and was uninterested in the episode, finding the alien delegation subplot to be "mostly just silly", and the majority of the episode was a "weak-beer mystery that's mostly an excuse for Gates McFadden and Sir Patrick Stewart to act weird and for Brent Spiner to be a silly Sherlock". James Hunt thought that Spiner's Sherlock impression was "completely brilliant", in his review for Den of Geek in October 2012. He thought that the episode shared a lot with some of the third season of The Original Series episodes, saying, "By which I mean it looks cheap and appears to have been written by a child, in yellow crayon."

Cast member Wil Wheaton rewatched the episode for AOL TV in November 2006. He criticized the writing of Fontana in this episode, saying that around this time she appeared on a panel at a convention about how to solve "The Wesley Problem", but when rewatching the episode he thought that "maybe instead of sitting on this panel and trashing me, D.C Fontana could have written intelligent dialogue for me and helped solve the 'Wesley problem' herself. I don't know, maybe she tried to do that and didn't get a lot of support from the rest of the producers and writing staff, but even I know of Dr. Channing's theory of not writing clichéd dialogue for kids in science fiction, and then blaming the actor who is forced to deliver it." Overall he criticized the "very stiff" dialogue throughout the episode, and called the set-up "incredibly forced". He did highlight that Data acting out as Sherlock Holmes laid the foundation of future episodes which would expand on this.

Zack Handlen reviewed the episode for The A.V. Club in April 2010. He too thought that the alien delegation subplot was poorly executed in a comedic fashion, and said that this "combined with the slow pace and a number of dialog scenes that can be charitably described as 'character development' (or more accurately as 'padding'), this is an unmemorable episode that shows a series still unsure of its greatest strengths." He gave the episode a grade of "C−".

== Home media release ==
The first home media release of "Lonely Among Us" was on VHS cassette, appearing on April 1, 1992 in the United States and Canada. Episodes from "Encounter at Farpoint" to "Datalore" were released in Japan on LaserDisc on June 10, 1995, as part of First Season Part.1. This included the first season episode "Lonely Among Us", and the box set has a total runtime of 638 minutes across multiple 12-inch optical video discs. The episode was later included on the Star Trek: The Next Generation season one DVD box set, released in March 2002. The episode was released as part of the season one Blu-ray set on July 24, 2012.
