= The Naked Time =

- Star Trek: The Original Series episode
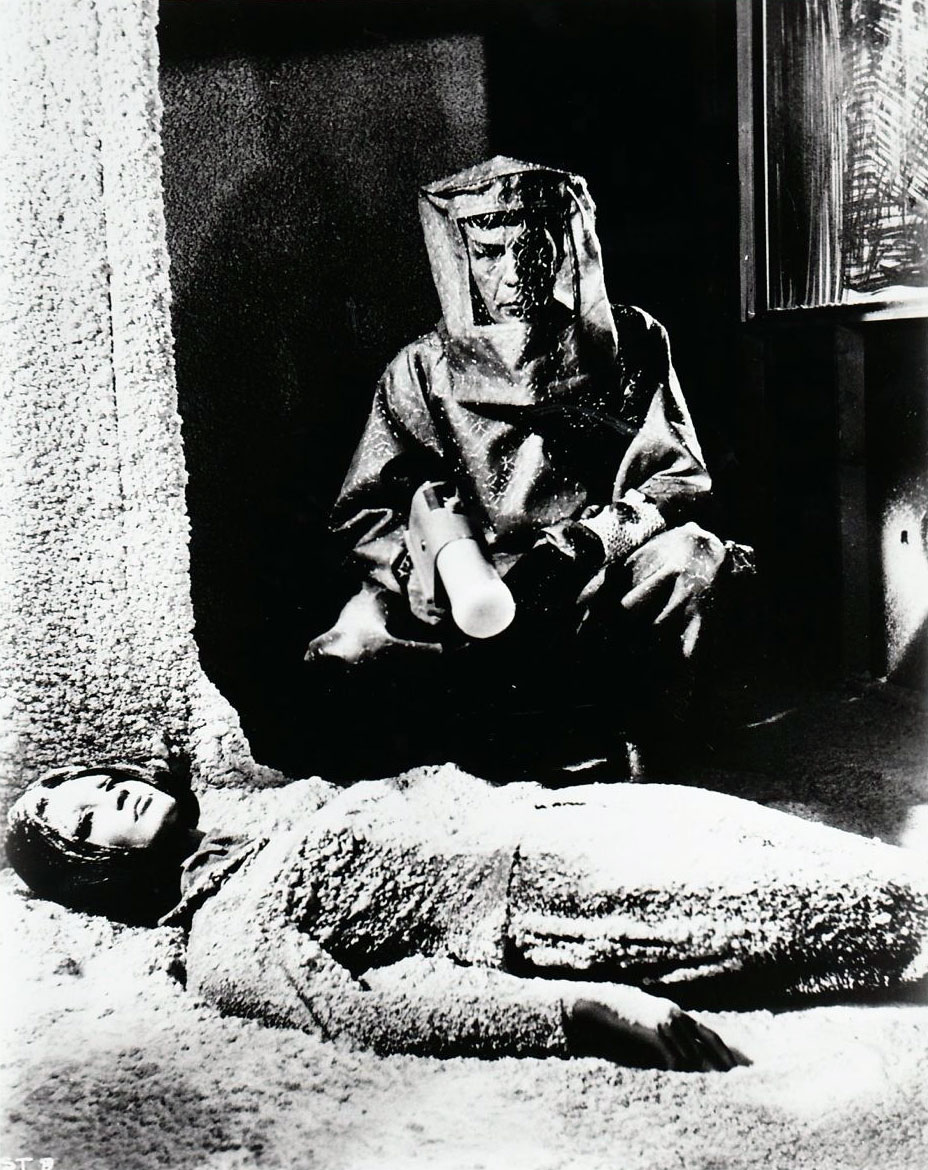
- Spock on the planet Psi 2000
- Episode no.: Season 1 Episode 4
- Directed by: Marc Daniels
- Written by: John D. F. Black
- Cinematography by: Jerry Finnerman
- Production code: 7
- Original air date: September 29, 1966

Guest appearances
- Bruce Hyde – Lt. Kevin Thomas Riley; Majel Barrett – Nurse Christine Chapel; Stewart Moss – Lt. Joe Tormolen; William Frederick Knight – Amorous Crewman; John Bellah – Laughing Crewman

Episode chronology
← Previous "Where No Man Has Gone Before"	Next → "The Enemy Within"
- Star Trek: The Original Series season 1

"The Naked Time" is the fourth episode of the first season of the American science fiction television series Star Trek. Written by John D. F. Black and directed by Marc Daniels, it first aired on September 29, 1966.

In the episode, a strange, intoxicating infection, which lowers the crew's inhibitions, spreads throughout the Enterprise. As the madness spreads, the entire ship is endangered.

This was the first episode in which the audience saw the Vulcan nerve pinch (the nerve pinch was actually filmed first in "The Enemy Within", but the latter was broadcast a week after "The Naked Time").

The story has a sequel in Star Trek: The Next Generation, the 1987 episode "The Naked Now".

== Plot ==
The USS Enterprise under the command of Captain Kirk arrives at the dying planet Psi 2000. Their mission is to observe and document the planet's breakup, and to retrieve a research team stationed on the planet. Mr. Spock and Lt (junior grade) Joe Tormolen beam down and find the researchers' life support system shut down and the team frozen—one fully clothed in a shower, one seated at a control console as if nothing was wrong, and a woman strangled (pictured). Tormolen removes his environmental suit glove to scratch his nose and comes into physical contact with a strange red liquid. The landing party is beamed back to the ship and examined by Chief Medical Officer Dr. McCoy. McCoy finds no medical issues with them and allows them to return to duty.

While having lunch, Tormolen begins to act irrationally, expressing hostility towards other crew members, and threatening Lieutenants Sulu and Riley with a knife before turning it on himself. His wound is not life-threatening, but in sick bay he dies after a successful surgery, to McCoy's bewilderment.

Both Sulu and Riley also begin to behave irrationally. Sulu runs about with a sword, like a swashbuckler from The Three Musketeers, while Riley revels in his Irish ancestry, locks himself in the engineering section, and proclaims himself captain of the Enterprise. Riley repeatedly sings a disjointed version of the old ballad "I'll Take You Home Again, Kathleen". Those whose skin they have touched also start showing erratic symptoms, and the infection quickly spreads through the crew. As they abandon their posts, the ship's orbit destabilizes and it falls into the planet's erratic gravity well. As the Enterprise enters the upper atmosphere, the hull begins to heat.

Chief Engineer Scott regains control of engineering from Riley, but Riley has shut down the engines. It will be impossible to restart them by normal procedures before the Enterprise burns up.

Spock becomes infected when Nurse Chapel takes his hands and confesses her love for him. Spock struggles to contain his emotions, and infects Captain James T. Kirk when he tries to help. McCoy studies blood samples from his patients and water from Psi 2000 and finds that the water from the planet possesses a previously undetected complex chain of molecules that affects humanoids like alcohol, depressing the centers of judgment and self-control, and is transmitted by touch. He develops a serum to reverse the effects, administering the initial doses to the command crew to allow them to bring the ship back under control.

Kirk orders Scott to make a full-power restart of the warp engines, a dangerous process that mixes matter and antimatter in a cold state to create a controlled implosion and drive the ship away from the planet. This is suggested by a theory postulating a relationship between time and antimatter, but it has never before been attempted. The restart is successful, propelling the Enterprise at impossible speed away from the planet into a spacetime warp that sends the ship back 71 hours in time. Spock comments that they now know a way to travel back through time. Kirk's response is "We may risk it someday, Mr. Spock."

== Production ==
"The Naked Time" was originally intended to be a two-part episode, with part one ending with a cliffhanger with the Enterprise going back in time. The ending was revised so it would become a standalone episode. What would have been part two eventually became another standalone episode, "Tomorrow Is Yesterday".

When the script required Lieutenant Sulu to reveal that in his deepest self he sees himself as a swashbuckler, George Takei had to learn how to handle a fencing rapier in a hurry. When not needed on the set, he would practice fencing, frequently lunging at passing members of the film crew and sometimes pinking them. A delegation eventually called on Gene Roddenberry and threatened that the entire crew would quit if Sulu were ever given a sword again.

"The Naked Time" is the only episode of The Original Series in which the rank of Lieutenant (junior grade) was shown or referred to. The sleeve insignia of that rank is a single broken stripe, and Joseph Tormolen is the only member of the Enterprise crew ever to be shown wearing it.

"The Naked Time" is also the only episode of The Original Series in which all three principal female characters, Lt. Nyota Uhura (Nichelle Nichols), Yeoman Janice Rand (Grace Lee Whitney), and Nurse Christine Chapel (Majel Barrett), appear in the same episode.

== Notes ==
The events of this episode are repeated in the Star Trek: The Next Generation episode "The Naked Now", where Riker references the incident as an in-universe historical event. Events are also mentioned in the TNG Season 6 episode "Relics".

The 2009 Star Trek film makes a reference to the scene where Sulu acts like a swashbuckler, when Kirk asks Sulu what type of combat training he has and he replies "fencing".

Footage from this episode appears in the 2014 film X-Men: Days of Future Past.

A reference to this episode is made in the "Hollywood Knights!" episode of Scooby-Doo and Guess Who? when guest star George Takei shows up bare-chested and wielding an epee.

This episode is referenced by name in the Star Trek: Lower Decks episode "I, Excretus," when Ensign Mariner enters a "naked time" training simulation in which the crew of the USS Cerritos is afflicted with the infection. The simulation takes the name literally, and the crew is depicted as being nude.

== Releases ==
In July 2011, the streaming service Netflix made all Star Trek episodes available, which would include this episode.

== Reception ==
George Takei has repeatedly mentioned in interviews that this is his favorite episode, and spends a chapter on it in his autobiography.

In 2012, The Christian Science Monitor ranked this the third best episode of the original Star Trek.

In 2013, Wired magazine ranked this episode one of the top ten most underrated episodes of The Original Series at that time.

In 2015, Syfy ranked this episode as one of the top ten essential Star Trek original series Spock episodes.

In 2016, SyFy listed Uhura's rebuff of the maddened Sulu's offer to "protect" her as the character's tenth best moment in Star Trek.

IGN ranked "The Naked Time" the 8th best episode of The Original Series in 2016 and the 12th best episode of all Star Trek series in 2013.

In 2016, USA Today noted "The Naked Time" as an interesting episode of the Star Trek franchise.

In 2018, PopMatters ranked this the 11th best episode of The Original Series.

In 2019, Nerdist included this episode on their "Best of Spock" binge-watching guide.

In 2021, Screen Rant ranked it as the 15th best episode of the original Star Trek series to re-watch.

In 2024 Hollywood.com ranked The Naked Time at number 18 out of the 79 original series episodes.

== See also ==
- *Star Trek IV: The Voyage Home – 1986 American science fiction film directed by Leonard Nimoy

ST:TOS

- "All Our Yesterdays"
- "Assignment: Earth"
- "The City on the Edge of Forever"
- "This Side of Paradise"
- "Tomorrow Is Yesterday"

Other episodes

- "Amok Time"
- "This Side of Paradise"
