= John D. F. Black =

American scriptwriter, director, and producer (1932–2018)

- Born: John Donald Francis Black; December 30, 1932; United States
- Died: November 29, 2018 (aged 85); Woodland Hills, California, United States
- Occupations: Director; television producer; writer

John Donald Francis Black (December 30, 1932 – November 29, 2018) was a screenwriter, TV producer, and TV director. He is best known for his work on the TV series Star Trek: The Original Series in 1966, and its sequel series, Star Trek: The Next Generation during the 1980s.

== Work ==
Black was the associate producer for ten episodes of Star Trek made during the program's first season, all of which were broadcast from September 8, 1966, through December 15, 1966. Black also wrote the teleplay for and was the associate producer of one of the early episodes of Star Trek—"The Naked Time". During the 1980s, Black was also given credit for the story for the Star Trek: The Next Generation sequel episode, "The Naked Now." Black also received shared story-writing credit (with Worley Thorne, who wrote the teleplay) for an episode in the series, "Justice", under the pseudonym of "Ralph Wills".

Black also wrote for many other TV series, including The Mary Tyler Moore Show, Charlie's Angels, Hawaii Five-O, The Fugitive, Mission: Impossible, and Mannix.

In his work for motion pictures, Black co-wrote the movie adaptation of Shaft (1971), along with co-writer Ernest Tidyman, who had written the original novel of Shaft. Black also was the screenwriter and executive producer of the detective film Trouble Man (1972), which starred Robert Hooks and whose musical score was written by Marvin Gaye.

=== Films ===
Year	Film	Credit	Notes
1957	The Unearthly	Screenplay By	Credited as Geoffrey Dennis
1967	Gunfight in Abilene	Screenplay By	Co-Wrote screenplay with "Bernie Giler"
1968	Nobody's Perfect	Screenplay By	Based on the novel "The Crows of Edwina Hill" by "Allan R. Bosworth"
1968	Three Guns For Texas	Written By	
1971	Shaft	Screenplay By	Co-Wrote screenplay with "Ernest Tidyman", Based on the novel "Shaft" by "Ernest Tidyman"
1971	Thief	Written By	Television Movie
1971	Do Not Fold, Spindle or Mutilate	Screenplay By	Television Movie, Based on the novel "Do Not Fold, Spindle, or Mutilate" by "Doris Miles Disney"
1972	The Carey Treatment	Screenplay By	Credited as James P. Bonner, Co-Wrote screenplay with "Harriet Frank Jr." and "Irving Ravetch", Based on the novel "A Case of Need" by Jeffery Hudson"
1972	Trouble Man	Written By, Executive Producer	
1973	The Fuzz Brothers	Written By, Produced By	
1974	Wonder Woman	Written By, Executive Producer	
1975	A Shadow in the Streets	Written By, Produced By	
1976	Survival	Screenplay By	
1978	The Clone Master	Written By, Produced By	

=== Television ===
Year	TV Series	Credit	Notes
1959	Johnny Staccato	Writer	
1961-62	Surfside 6	Writer	2 Episodes
1961-62	Lawman	Writer	9 Episodes
1962	Have Gun – Will Travel	Writer	1 Episode
1962-63	The Untouchables	Writer	3 Episodes
1963	Combat!	Writer	1 Episode
1963	The Fugitive	Writer	1 Episode
1963	The Eleventh Hour	Writer	1 Episode
1963	Kraft Suspense Theatre	Writer	1 Episode
1963-70	The Virginian	Writer	2 Episodes
1964-65	Mr. Novak	Writer	6 Episodes
1965-66	Laredo	Writer	7 Episodes
1966	Star Trek	Writer, Associate Producer	
1966	Run for your Life	Writer	1 Episode
1966-67	Insight	Writer	3 Episodes
1967	Cimarron Strip	Writer	1 Episode
1968-69	The F.B.I.	Writer	3 Episodes
1968-71	Mission: Impossible	Writer	3 Episodes
1968-72	Hawaii Five-O	Writer	10 Episodes
1969	The High Chaparral	Writer	1 Episode
1970	The Mary Tyler Moore Show	Writer	1 Episode
1970-71	Room 222	Writer	6 Episodes
1971	Mannix	Writer	1 Episode
1971	The Bill Cosby Show	Writer	1 Episode
1971	Getting Together	Writer	1 Episode
1973-76	The Streets of San Francisco	Writer	3 Episodes
1976	Jigsaw John	Writer	1 Episode
1977	Delvecchio	Writer	1 Episode
1977	Man from Atlantis	Writer	1 Episode
1977	Most Wanted	Writer	1 Episode
1977	Charlie's Angels	Writer, Director	
1985	Hell Town	Writer	1 Episode
1987	Star Trek: The Next Generation	Writer	2 Episodes
1987	Murder, She Wrote	Writer	1 Episode
????	Safe at Home	Writer	1 Episode
2015	Star Trek Continues	Script Consultant	1 Episode

== Awards ==
In 1972, Black received an Edgar Award from the Writers Guild of America in the category of "Best Television Feature or Miniseries Teleplay" for writing the script for the made-for-TV movie Thief.

== Death ==
According to Black's widow Mary Black, he died peacefully of natural causes at the Motion Picture Hospital in Woodland Hills, California.
