= Herbert Wright (producer) =

American television director (1946–2005)

Herbert J. Wright
- Died: August 24, 2005; Woodland Hills, California
- Occupation(s): Writer, Producer
- Known for: Star Trek: The Next Generation, War of the Worlds

Herbert J. Wright (November 9, 1946 – August 24, 2005) was a science fiction author and television director and producer. He was born in Keokuk, Iowa. His most notable works were Star Trek: The Next Generation and War of the Worlds. He directed a few episodes of the latter series and wrote and directed the season finale "The Angel of Death," which guest-starred his second wife Elaine Giftos. Among Star Trek fans he is known as the "Father of the Ferengi".

Wright graduated from Yale with honors in 1969. After which he moved to Hollywood and working in the filmmaking industry. He also studied in Japan as an AFS/American Field Service exchange student, during which he met with director Akira Kurosawa, and began his lifelong study of martial arts.

== Career ==
Wright's works include Rod Serling's Night Gallery, Cadillacs and Dinosaurs, Stingray, Hunter, McCloud, and the Flipper revival series.

He also worked on (off television) Mars and Beyond, which featured Giftos and was distributed on his Cyber Sci-Fi Network.

Wright had a strong friendship with Gene Roddenberry. The two met while Roddenberry was making The Questor Tapes. He showed a great interest in the story, and was going to contribute to the series that was planned to follow. However, the project fell apart due to Roddenberry's conflicts with the studio. Though Roddenberry considered the series to be dead, the concept stuck with Wright, who had hopes that it could be revived. When the rights finally fell back to the Roddenberry family in the 2000s, Wright secured the option to the property and set out to produce the series, updating it while still staying true to Roddenberry's vision.

== Personal life ==
Wright was a martial artist and held a blackbelt in Japanese Sword.

He died of prostate cancer in Woodland Hills, California, on August 24, 2005, at age 58. He is survived by his wife, actress Elaine Giftos and daughter.
