= List of Star Trek materials =

This is a list of notable fictional materials from the science fiction universe of Star Trek. Like other aspects of stories in the franchise, some were recurring plot elements from one episode or series to another.

== Metals for starship construction ==
The fictional metals duranium and tritanium were referred to in many episodes of Star Trek as extremely hard alloys used in starship hulls and hand-held tools. The planet-killer in "The Doomsday Machine" had a hull made of solid neutronium, which is capable of withstanding a starship's phasers. Neutronium is considered to be virtually indestructible; the only known way of stopping the planet-killer is to destroy it from the inside via the explosion of a starship's impulse engines. Federation ships in the 32nd century also used this material in their construction. Enterprise NX-01 partly consists of horonium, an element that is rare to find but can be synthesised. It is also used to power a time portal on Krulmuth-B.

=== Transparent aluminum ===
Star Trek technical manuals indicate that transparent aluminium is used in various fittings in starships, including exterior ship portals and windows. It was notably mentioned in the 1986 film Star Trek IV: The Voyage Home. Ultra-strong transparent panels were needed to construct water tanks within their ship's cargo bay for containing two humpback whales and hundreds of tons of water. However, the Enterprise crew, without money appropriate to the period, found it necessary to barter for the required materials. Chief Engineer Montgomery Scott exchanges the chemical formula for transparent aluminum for the needed material. When Dr. Leonard McCoy informs Scott that giving Dr. Nichols (Alex Henteloff) the formula is altering the future, the engineer responds, "Why? How do we know he didn't invent the thing?" (In the novelization of the film, Scott is aware that Dr. Marcus "Mark" Nichols, the Plexicorp scientist with whom he and McCoy deal, was its "inventor", and concludes that his giving of the formula is a predestination paradox/bootstrap paradox.) The substance is described as being as transparent as glass while possessing the strength and density of high-grade aluminium. It was also mentioned in the Star Trek: The Next Generation episode "In Theory".

The series' science consultant, André Bormanis, has concluded that the material would not be a good electrical conductor.

Transparent real-life aluminium compounds or aluminium metal

Just as water differs from its component hydrogen, so do compounds of aluminum differ from aluminum itself.

- Corundum (Al2O3) is transparent and is widely used in commercial and industrial settings. It has a hardness of 9 Mohs, making it the third hardest mineral after diamond and moissanite.
- Aluminium oxynitride ((AlN)_{x}·(Al_{2}O_{3})_{1−x}) is another transparent ceramic, with a hardness of 7.7 Mohs, and has military applications as bullet-resistant armour, but is too expensive for widespread use. It was patented in 1986.

An aluminium windowpane "of glass-like transparency" was reported from Germany in 1933.

Pure transparent aluminium was created as a new state of matter by a team of scientists in 2009. A laser pulse removed an electron from every atom without disrupting the crystalline structure. However, the transparent state lasted for only 40 femtoseconds, until electrons returned to the material.

A group of scientists led by Ralf Röhlsberger at Deutsches Elektronen-Synchrotron (DESY), Hamburg, Germany, succeeded in turning iron transparent to hard X-rays during research in 2012 to create quantum computers.

=== Trellium-D ===
Trellium-D, shown in Star Trek: Enterprise, was an alloy used in the Delphic Expanse as a protection against spatial anomalies there. It had unusual effects on Vulcan physiology, causing a loss of emotional control, and became a recurring plot element in the third season of Star Trek: Enterprise, exploring the theme of drug addiction.

Other materials were occasionally mentioned in the scripts, such as nitrium, a radiation-resistant material.

== Energy sources ==
Dilithium

Dilithium crystals, in all Star Trek series, were shown to be an essential component for a starship's faster than light drive, or warp drive, since they were necessary to regulate the matter-antimatter reactions needed to generate the required energy. Dilithium was frequently featured in the original series as a scarce resource. By the time the later series were set, dilithium could be synthesized.

Trilithium

Trilithium is a material used in a star-destroying weapon in Star Trek Generations, and an explosive in "The Chute" (VOY). This is due to the fact that trilithium is termed a "nuclear inhibitor," which is believed to be any substance that interferes with nuclear reactions. In the film, trilithium is known to be capable, when used to its full potential, of stopping all fusion within a star, thereby collapsing the star and destroying everything within its solar system via a shock wave. Trilithium resin is a toxic byproduct of warp engines, and can be used as a powerful, and quite unstable, explosive (see "Starship Mine", the 18th episode of the sixth season of Star Trek: The Next Generation). It is not known whether this is related to the nuclear inhibitor.

== Precious materials ==
Latinum is featured in many episodes of Deep Space Nine as a medium of exchange used by Ferengi and other races. It exists as a liquid at ambient conditions, has an extremely high value per unit weight/volume, and is impossible to replicate. For easier handling, it is incorporated into gold casings of various standard sizes. (At one point, Jadzia Dax remarks that the idea of doing so may have come from "somebody who got tired of making change with an eyedropper.") The combination is referred to as "gold-pressed latinum" and is divided into denominations of slips, strips, bars, and bricks in ascending order of value. The Deep Space Nine episode "Body Parts" establishes that there are 100 slips to one strip, and 20 strips to one bar; the conversion between the brick and any smaller unit is never mentioned. The Ferengi considered gold to be a valuable commodity in the past, but now regard it as worthless when not combined with latinum.

Tholian silk was a valuable fabric mentioned in multiple series.

Bio-mimetic gel is a volatile substance with medical applications. It is also highly sought after for use in illegal activities, such as genetic experimentation and biological weapons development. As such, its use is strictly regulated by the United Federation of Planets, and sale of the substance is prohibited. The substance was first mentioned in an episode of Star Trek: The Next Generation, and was used as a plot element in several episodes of Star Trek: Deep Space Nine.

== Propulsion ==
Verterium cortenide is a usually synthetically generated compound, the only known substance to be capable of generating warp fields, when supplied with energy, in form of plasma, from the warp core. Warp coils are made of this material.

Benamite is a rare and unstable form of crystal required to construct and run a quantum slipstream drive. According to "Timeless" (VOY), benamite is extremely difficult to synthesize and creating enough for one slipstream drive can take years. Synthesized benamite is also known to decay and become useless over time. It is not known if naturally occurring benamite is subject to the same process of decay.

== Minerals ==
Kironide is a mineral by which, upon consuming plants containing the mineral, the Platonians (the inhabitants of the planet Platonius) acquire telekinetic powers, including the ability to levitate, in the original series episode "Plato's Stepchildren".

Pergium is a substance mined in "The Devil in the Dark", and fictionally given the atomic number 112 as a chemical element in a non-canon Star Trek medical manual publication. It is also an element needed on Voyager that Neelix seeks in "Fair Trade" (S3 E13; VOY).

== Drugs ==
Cordrazine, introduced in "The City on the Edge of Forever", is a powerful stimulant used to revive patients in an emergency. Overdoses cause hallucinations, madness and death.

Felicium, a highly addictive narcotic produced on the planet Brekka, but misrepresented as a medicine for a plague affecting the planet Ornara. It was introduced in the episode "Symbiosis".

Venus drug, introduced in "Mudd's Women", causes women to appear much lovelier and more exciting.

Inaprovaline, introduced in "Transfigurations". Helps resuscitate the neurological and cardiovascular systems by reinforcing the cell membranes. It is also frequently used as an analgesic.

Ketracel-White, introduced in Star Trek: Deep Space Nine, is a stimulant drug intravenously taken among the Jem'Hadar soldiers of The Dominion. The Jem'Hadar were created by the Founders – a shape-shifting species in the Gamma Quadrant – with a genetic predisposition for addiction to the drug. This was done to ensure their loyalty to the Founders. The drug is synthetically manufactured and refined at guarded facilities throughout Dominion space. Ketracel-White is stored as a liquid in glass vials locked in portable cases held by Vorta field supervisors. A Vorta must dispense the drug among the unit they command at regular intervals, otherwise the Jem'Hadar will suffer withdrawal leading to death. A vial of White is inserted into a dispensing mechanism embedded in the soldier's chest armor, and automatically pumped through a tube inserted into the common carotid artery. The Son'a were also known for their production of Ketracel-White (Star Trek: Insurrection).

Retinax-5, introduced in Star Trek II: The Wrath of Khan, a drug that corrects vision problems.

== Unstable substances ==
Protomatter is a key component of the Genesis Device prototype—an experimental terraformation device introduced in Star Trek II: The Wrath of Khan. Protomatter is presented as an unstable substance that, due to its instability, is considered unethical for usage in scientific research. The substance is used as a plot device to compare David Marcus with his father, James T. Kirk, both of whom, in Lieutenant Saavik's words, "changed the rules"—David Marcus by using the forbidden protomatter, and James T. Kirk by "cheating" to win the Kobayashi Maru test. The inclusion of protomatter ultimately results in both the accelerated maturation of the regenerated Spock during his stay on the Genesis planet, and the planet's subsequent explosion into an asteroid belt.

In the Deep Space Nine episode "By Inferno's Light", Protomatter was used by a Dominion changeling in a bomb plot that, if successful, would have destroyed the Bajoran sun and the forces of the Alpha Quadrant.

Protomatter is also mentioned in the Star Trek: Voyager episode "Mortal Coil", where it is said, "Protomatter's one of the most sought-after commodities. The best energy source in the quadrant."

The Omega Molecule is a highly unstable molecule believed to be the most powerful substance known to exist. If not properly disposed of, it may destroy subspace and render warp travel impossible. In Star Trek: Voyager, during the episode The Omega Directive, Voyager encounters Omega particles and Captain Janeway must comply with the Omega Directive and destroy the particles. Later in the episode, they spontaneously stabilize for a brief moment before they are destroyed.

== Other ==
Red matter is a red liquid material introduced in Star Trek (the 2009 film) that is able to create a black hole when not properly contained. Spock attempts to use it to stop a massive supernova, but the resulting black hole causes his own ship and a Romulan mining vessel to travel back in time. Later in the film, the antagonist Nero uses it to destroy the planet Vulcan. Shortly after, the future Spock's ship containing the red matter is used to destroy Nero's Romulan mining vessel.

== Fictional substances within Star Trek ==
Corbomite was named by Captain Kirk in a bluff in "The Corbomite Maneuver" as a material and a device that prevents attack, because if any destructive energy touches the vessel, a reverse reaction of equal strength is created, destroying the attacker. This bluff was also used in "The Deadly Years" to escape the Romulans.

Archerite was named by Commander Shran also in a bluff in "Proving Ground" as a material that his ship was looking to mine, during an encounter at the test site of the Xindi planet killer weapon.

== See also ==
- List of fictional elements, materials, isotopes and subatomic particles
