= Dilithium (Star Trek) =

Fictional material

In the Star Trek fictional universe, dilithium is a fictional material that serves as a controlling agent in the matter–antimatter reactors. In the original series, dilithium crystals were rare and could not be replicated, making the search for them a recurring plot element. According to a periodic table shown during a Next Generation episode, it has the atomic number 87 (which in reality belongs to francium), and the chemical symbol Dt.

In the real world, dilithium (Li_{2}) is a molecule composed of two covalently bonded lithium atoms which exists naturally in gaseous lithium.

Dilithium is depicted as a valuable, extremely hard crystalline mineral that occurs naturally on some planets.

== Use ==
The fictional properties of the material in the authors' guide Star Trek: The Next Generation Technical Manual (1991) explain it as uniquely suited to contain and regulate the annihilation reaction of matter and antimatter in a starship's warp core: In a high-frequency electromagnetic field, eddy currents are induced in the dilithium crystal structure, which keep charged particles away from the crystal lattice. This prevents it from coming in contact with antimatter when so energized, hence never annihilating, because the antimatter particles never actually touch it. (Note: Presumably, if unregulated amounts of antimatter could merge with matter it would result in a matter-antimatter annihilation explosion, by the general analogy that any power source becomes dangerous if not strictly controlled, and the greater the power provided, the greater the risks related to its use. See boiler explosion.)

In the original series, dilithium crystals were rare, and crystals made by replicator were unsatisfactory for use in warp drives. Hence story lines based on the need for natural dilithium crystals for travel—much like petroleum—made deposits of this material a highly contested resource between fictional factions in the stories, and as such, dilithium crystals have been used by writers to introduce interstellar conflict more than all other reasons combined.

As depicted on the show, the streams of matter (deuterium gas) and antimatter (anti-deuterium) directed into crystallized dilithium are unbalanced—there is usually much more matter in the stream than antimatter. The annihilation reaction heats the excess deuterium gas, which produces plasma for the nacelles and allows faster-than-light travel. In addition, film sets representing the crawl-spaces for the inner workings of starships tend to be depicted as adjacent to the "EPS" conduits that channel plasma to critical ships' internal systems. (Note: In the series Star Trek: Enterprise (2001–2005), this was referred to as an electro-plasma system (a backronym of the term "EPS", which was used in all other series except the original series) to refer to a ship's or station's power system. The specific details of this reaction were officially established in the Star Trek: The Next Generation (1987–1994) series and technical manual; in earlier works, it is not clearly defined.)

== Fictional properties ==
Dilithium is a member of a so-called "hypersonic" series of elements, according to a fictional periodic table graphic presented in episodes of Star Trek: The Next Generation and Star Trek: Deep Space Nine (1993–1999). The material is suspected by its fictional users of existing in more dimensions than the conventional three plus one dimensions of spacetime, and that this somehow is related to its unconventional or paradoxical properties.

The dilithium mineral structure is 2(5)6 dilithium 2(:)l diallosilicate 1:9:1 heptoferranide, according to the authors' guide Star Trek: The Next Generation Technical Manual (1991).

In respect of the fictional replication technology used as background for the Star Trek universe, although low-quality artificial crystals can be grown or replicated, the synthetic dilithium crystals can only regulate a limited amount of power without fragmenting, and are largely unsuitable for use in warp drives. (Note: In Star Trek IV: The Voyage Home, Spock recrystallized a Klingon Bird of Prey's decaying dilithium through exposure to high-energy photons as generated by 20th century fission reactors – although the dialog pointed out that not only was the method of recrystalization itself hazardous, but the needed 20th century nuclear reactors were no longer used in the 23rd century.)

== See also ==
- List of Star Trek materials
