= Star Trek: The Next Generation U.S.S. Enterprise NCC-1701-D Blueprints =

Star Trek: The Next Generation USS Enterprise NCC-1701-D Blueprints
- Author: Rick Sternbach
- Illustrator: Rick Sternbach
- Publisher: Pocket Books
- ISBN: 0-671-50093-7
- OCLC: 35136141
- Dewey Decimal: 791.45/72 21
- LC Class: PN1992.77.S732 S74 1996

Created by Rick Sternbach, this publication contains a collection of large-format blueprints of the interior and exterior of the USS Enterprise-D. They catalog every deck of the ship, and also including exterior views and a side-view cutaway. A booklet discussing the blueprints is also included.

== Production ==
Rick Sternbach said that his team used several methods to create the blueprints. First they had to gather material, so they went to the archives of the Star Trek: The Next Generation art department, where they found plans and drawings of the various sets created for the show. They also collected exterior drawings and photos to see how the ship had changed from its conception to its destruction in Star Trek Generations.

They also transferred the ink-drawings of the exterior of the ship, which had been used in the Star Trek: The Next Generation Technical Manual, to the computer for greater detail since the plans were going to be printed in this case.

== Inside the Box ==
Besides small advertisements included in the package, the blueprints include several things:

- A 16-page booklet that talks in detail about the production team and the production of the blueprints.
- Thirteen sheets of 22" by 34" blueprints, including three of external elevations, one with a side cutaway and the first two decks, ten with the deck plans and the last one includes the symbol key for various symbols used throughout the plans.

== Previous blueprint project ==
Five years prior to Rick Sternbach's version being published, Ed Whitefire, an artist and designer in the aerospace industry, contacted Paramount Studios about preparing and publishing the blueprints for the Enterprise-D. He presented his idea to Star Trek Art Department staff member Andrew Probert and was given the go ahead to start designing and drawing the Enterprise-D blueprints, also consulting with Mike Okuda and Rick Sternbach. After working on the designs for more than two years, his publisher FASA lost their contract with Paramount Studios. Pocket Books, which still had a license, was offered Whitefire's work for publication but declined, eventually going with Sternbach. Years later, Whitefire gave permission for Cygnus X1 to publish his blueprints online.
