= Transporter (Star Trek) =

Teleportation device installed on starships in Star Trek

- Star Trek franchise element
- Transporter platform aboard the USS Enterprise-D from The Next Generation
- First appearance: Star Trek: The Original Series
- Created by: Gene Roddenberry
- Genre: Science fiction

In-universe information
- Type: Teleportation device
- Function: Allows for very rapid transport of matter between transporter device and a fixed point

A transporter is a fictional teleportation machine used in the Star Trek universe. Transporters allow for teleportation by converting a person or object into an energy pattern (a process called "dematerialization"), then sending ("beaming") it to a target location or else returning it to the transporter, where it is reconverted into matter ("rematerialization"). The command often used to request activation of the transporter is "Energize."

Introduced in Star Trek: The Original Series in 1966, the transporter had predecessors in teleportation devices in other science fiction stories, such as the 1939 serial Buck Rogers. The name and similar concepts have made their way to later science fiction scenarios, in literature (such as the Thousand Cultures series), games (SimEarth), etc.

The transporter was originally conceived as a device to convey characters from a starship to the surface of a planet without the need for expensive and time-consuming special effects to depict the starship or another craft physically landing. Malfunctioning transporters are also often used as a plot device to set up a variety of science fiction premises. The transporter has become a hallmark of the Star Trek franchise; the famous catchphrase "Beam me up, Scotty" (a misquote) refers to the use of the transporter on Star Trek: The Original Series, operated by the character Montgomery Scott, presumably at the request of Captain Kirk. Transporter technology has been used in many subsequent Star Trek series.

== Design ==
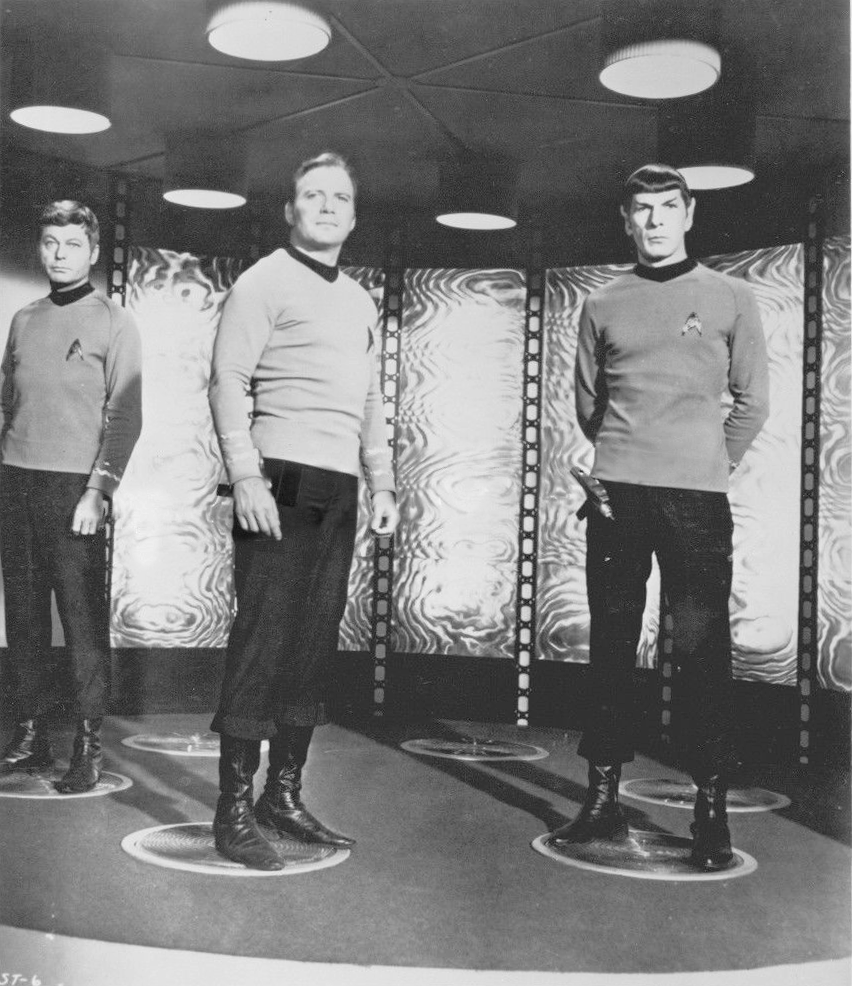
McCoy, Kirk and Spock in the transporter room

On Star Trek: The Original Series, the transporter was portrayed as a platform on which characters stand before being engulfed by a beam of light and transported to their destination. The transporter's special effect was originally created by turning a slow-motion camera upside down and photographing some backlit shiny grains of aluminium powder that were dropped between the camera and a black background; later series would eventually use computer animation for the effect. On The Original Series, the transporter operator would activate the device by moving three sliders on a console. In the sequel series Star Trek: The Next Generation, the sliders were replaced with three touch-sensitive light-up bars, which according to the Star Trek: The Next Generation Technical Manual were designed as a homage to the original sliders.

== Narrative function ==
Transporter chamber and control console aboard the USS Voyager, as seen on Star Trek: Voyager

Creator Gene Roddenberry's original plan did not include transporters, instead calling for characters to land the starship itself. However, this would have required unfeasible and unaffordable (for the 1960s) sets and model filming, as well as episode running time spent while landing, taking off, etc. The shuttlecraft was the next idea, but when filming began, the full-sized shooting model was not ready. Transporters were devised as a less expensive alternative, achieved by a simple fade-out/fade-in of the subject. Transporters first appear in the original pilot episode "The Cage".

=== Transporter accidents ===
Many episodes of Star Trek series feature transporter accidents as a plot device: a malfunctioning transporter fails to rematerialize a person or object properly in some bizarre way that creates a science-fictional problem or ethical dilemma that characters must resolve. In various episodes, transporter accidents have been used to send characters to a parallel universe, or back in time; to split a character into two distinct individuals, or merge two characters into a single individual; and to regress adult characters to children, among a variety of other effects.

== Portrayal ==
=== Fictional history ===
According to dialogue in the Star Trek: Enterprise (ENT) episode "Daedalus", the transporter was invented in the early 22nd century by Dr. Emory Erickson, who also became the first human to be successfully transported. Although the Enterprise (NX-01) has a transporter, the crew does not routinely use it for moving biological organisms. Instead, they generally prefer using shuttlepods or other means of transportation unless no other means of transportation are possible or feasible. The capability is rare; in "The Andorian Incident", the Andorians, technologically far superior to Starfleet in many regards, are explicitly stated not to possess the technology. In "Chosen Realm", a group of alien religious extremists who hijack the ship is unaware of it to the point that when Archer insists on sacrificing a crew member and claims that the device disintegrates matter rather than teleporting it, he is unhesitatingly taken at his word. The crew aboard the 23rd century USS Enterprise frequently use the transporter. By the 24th century, transporter travel was reliable and "the safest way to travel" according to dialogue in the Star Trek: The Next Generation (TNG) episode "Realm of Fear".

According to the Star Trek: Deep Space Nine episode "Homefront", Starfleet Academy cadets receive transporter rations, and the Sisko family once used a transporter to move furniture into a new home.

Despite its frequent use, characters such as Leonard McCoy and Katherine Pulaski are reluctant to use the transporter, as the characters express in the Next Generation episodes "Encounter at Farpoint" and "Unnatural Selection", respectively. Reginald Barclay expresses his outright fear of transporting in "Realm of Fear".

=== Capabilities and limitations ===
The television series and films do not go into great detail about transporter technology. The Star Trek: The Next Generation Technical Manual claims that the devices transport objects in real time, accurate to the quantum level. The episode TNG: "Realm of Fear" specifies the length of a transport under unusual circumstances would last "... four or five seconds; about twice the normal time" (making the length of a typical transport between 2 and 2.5 seconds). Heisenberg compensators remove uncertainty from the subatomic measurements, making transporter travel feasible. Further technology involved in transportation include a computer pattern buffer to enable a degree of leeway in the process. When asked "How does the Heisenberg compensator work?" by Time magazine, Star Trek technical adviser Michael Okuda responded: "It works very well, thank you."

According to The Original Series (TOS) writers' guide, the effective range of a transporter is 40,000 kilometers. The TOS episode "Obsession" however, appears to indicate that the transporters' maximum range, during that time period in Star Trek history, is actually around 30,000 kilometers. Transporter operations have been disrupted or prevented by dense metals (TNG: "Contagion"), solar flares (TNG: "Symbiosis"), and other forms of radiation, including electromagnetic (TNG: "The Enemy"; TNG: "Power Play") and nucleonic (TNG: "Schisms"), and affected by ion storms (TOS: "Mirror, Mirror"). Transporting, in progress, has also been stopped by telekinetic powers (TNG: "Skin of Evil") and by brute strength (TNG: "The Hunted"). The TNG episode "Bloodlines" features a dangerous and experimental "subspace transporter" capable of interstellar distances and the Dominion had the ability to transport over great distances (DS9: "Covenant"). The 40,000-kilometer limit is also referred to in ENT: "Daedalus". It was established in TOS episode "Arena" that the transporter cannot be used when the ship's deflector shields are up.

Starfleet transporters from the TNG era onward include a device that can detect and disable an active weapon (TNG: "The Most Toys"), and a bio-filter to remove contagious microbes or viruses from an individual in transport (TNG: "Shades of Gray", TOS: "The Naked Time"). The transporter can also serve a tactical purpose, such as beaming a photon grenade or photon torpedo to detonate at remote locations (TNG: "Legacy", VOY: "Dark Frontier"), or to outright destroy objects (TNG: "Captain's Holiday"). The TOS episode "A Taste of Armageddon" mentions Vendikar materializing fusion bombs over targets of enemy planet Eminiar VII in the course of theoretical computer warfare.

Klingon transporters, as seen in Star Trek III, have a harsh red light in contrast to Federation blue, and operate with complete silence (in the movie, no sound effects). Presumably this is to enhance the combat effectiveness of Klingon boarding parties. It is not made clear whether Klingon transporters are more risky for the boarders, but the warlike Klingons are likely not to be concerned about transport casualties in combat.

Whenever a person or object is transported, the machine creates a memory file of the pattern. This has been used at least once in every Star Trek series to revert people adversely affected by a transport to their original state.

Various episodes of Deep Space Nine (DS9) and Voyager (VOY) have introduced two anti-transporter devices: transport inhibitors and transporter scramblers. Inhibitors prevent a transporter beam from "locking on" to whatever the device is attached to. Scramblers distort the pattern that is in transit, literally scrambling the atoms upon rematerialization, resulting in the destruction of inanimate objects and killing living beings by rematerializing them as masses of random tissue; this was gruesomely demonstrated in the DS9 episode "The Darkness and the Light".

Transporter operations can also be curtailed when either the point of origin and/or the intended target site is moving at warp velocities. In the TNG episode "The Schizoid Man", a "long-range" or "near-warp" transport was required as a transporter beam cannot penetrate a warp field. (In the 2009 Star Trek film Kirk and Scotty beam aboard while the Enterprise is traveling at warp using a specific formula calculation from a future Scott, it takes place in the Kelvin continuity and has not been demonstrated in the Prime Continuity) To deposit an away team on the planet Gravesworld while at the same time responding to a distress signal, the Enterprise would only drop out of warp drive just long enough to energize the transporter beam. Geordi La Forge personally performed the delicate operation, which involved compensating for the ship's relativistic motion. After materializing, Deanna Troi commented that for a moment she thought she was trapped in a nearby wall, to which Worf replied, "For a moment, you were". The analogy would be jumping on or off two moving platforms the subject would have to be beamed "ahead" or "behind" the destination and allow for the subject to match the relative "speed" of destination before rematerializing. In later stories (TNG: "The Emissary" and TNG: "The Best of Both Worlds"), it was confirmed that the transporter would work at warp only if the sending and receiving sites were moving at equal velocities. Again the analogy being two moving platforms as the same velocity being no more difficulty than two stationary platforms.

In his book The Physics of Star Trek, after explaining the difference between transporting information and transporting the actual atoms, Krauss notes that "The Star Trek writers seem never to have got it exactly clear what they want the transporter to do. Does the transporter send the atoms and the bits, or just the bits?" He notes that according to the canon definition of the transporter the former seems to be the case, but that that definition is inconsistent with a number of applications, particularly incidents, involving the transporter, which appear to involve only a transport of information, for example the way in which it splits Kirk into two versions in the episode "The Enemy Within" or the way in which Riker is similarly split in the episode "Second Chances". Krauss elaborates that: "If the transporter carries both the matter stream and the information signal, this splitting phenomenon is impossible. The number of atoms you end up with has to be the same as the number you began with. There is no possible way to replicate people in this manner. On the other hand, if only the information were beamed up, one could imagine combining it with atoms that might be stored aboard a starship and making as many copies as wanted of an individual."

=== Reliability ===
Aside from external influences causing disruptions in the normal operations of transporters, the technology itself has been known to fail on occasion, causing serious injury or usually death to those being transported. This was demonstrated in Star Trek's 1979 film debut, Star Trek: The Motion Picture when a malfunction in the transporter sensor circuits resulted in insufficient signal being present at the Enterprise end to successfully rematerialize the two subjects, and Starfleet was unable to pull them back to where they had dematerialized from. The transporter system attempted to rematerialize what little signal was available, and despite the efforts of Kirk and Scotty, the system failed and both subjects vanished from the transporter pad and back to Starfleet, where both subjects died from radiation and disfiguration. Kirk, visibly shaken by what he had witnessed asked, "Starfleet, do you have them?", to which the response was made "Enterprise, what we got back didn't live long, fortunately".

By the time of The Next Generation, transporter technology has advanced considerably, meaning that accidents are now remote, if not near impossible. In the episode "Realm of Fear", Geordi La Forge states that there have been no more than two or three transporter accidents in the preceding ten years. Reference is also made to the advancement of transporter technology in the same episode, where Chief O'Brien states that each individual transporter pad has four redundant scanners whereby in the event a scanner fails the other three will take over, and that he has never lost anyone having been a transporter operator for over 20 years.

In "Rascals", four adult Enterprise crew members were beamed off a shuttle and rematerialized as children still in their adult-sized clothing. The incoming "matter stream" had a commensurate drop in mass; the operator had initially thought the reduction in mass meant "we may have lost one".

In the Voyager episode "Tuvix", a transporter accident combines both the physical and behavioral aspects of Lt. Tuvok and Neelix into a single being wearing a melange of each other's clothing. Notably, Tuvix was of equal mass of both Tuvok and Neelix combined. When they were later separated, Neelix and Tuvok were both wearing Starfleet uniforms.

=== Technological and scientific restrictions ===
While several characters have asserted that transporters cannot transport through a ship's shields or planetary defense shields, there are instances of this "rule" being broken through a technobabble solution (TNG: "The Wounded", DS9: "Trials and Tribble-ations") or disregarded by the show's writers (Voyager: "Caretaker"). The non-canon TNG Technical Manual describes how a starship may create "windows" in the shield geometry through which a transporter beam may propagate at the expense of creating weak spots in the vessel's defensive field.

In Star Trek II: The Wrath of Khan, Vice Admiral James T. Kirk and Lieutenant Saavik carry on a conversation during rematerialization. In Star Trek IV: The Voyage Home, Dr. Gillian Taylor jumps into Kirk's transporter beam during dematerialization, and rematerializes without any apparent ill effects. This is probably due to the "annular confinement beam", a component of the transporter mentioned in the various television episodes which serves to keep patterns separate from one another. In the same film, Mr. Spock is beamed onto a cloaked ship while walking.

According to the TNG Technical Manual, the transporter cannot move antimatter, but in the Voyager episode "Dark Frontier" Voyager transported a live photon torpedo equipped with antimatter onto a Borg ship. Also in TOS episode "Obsession" Kirk and a fellow crewman beam down to the surface of a planet with an antimatter bomb. The TAS episode "One of Our Planets Is Missing" has the Enterprise beaming a chunk of antimatter into a stasis box.

In the original series, beaming to and from the transporter chamber was a necessity. This is explained in the TOS episode "Day of the Dove". Spock and Scotty had said that doing a site-to-site transport, as they are referred to on the show, on board the ship could be risky. They could beam into a deck or other inanimate object and get stuck there. However, there are apparently safeguards in place to prevent people from being beamed into hostile environments such as under water and into lava pits, although it is possible to override this safety feature; for example, in the TOS episode "And the Children Shall Lead", two security guards are beamed into open space. In the following series, however, the transporter room seems to become mostly obsolete, the actual equipment notwithstanding. Characters are shown activating the transporter from ordinary consoles and beaming from place to place without apparent trouble. The main operator can likewise send those in transport anywhere with ease (for example, in the Voyager episode "In the Flesh", a medical console is used to transport a body from the morgue to the surgical bay). A possible explanation for this is put forward in the Star Trek: Deep Space Nine Technical Manual, where such site-to-site transports would probably use twice as much energy as would be required for transport to or from the transporter room itself, since the subject would have to be beamed to the transporter, stored, then shunted to their destination. In addition, the six circles on the platform are generally used as targets for the subjects to stand on, but they do not appear to represent any limitation of the hardware to six or fewer people. People have been transported carrying others, in a coffin style transport, as well as animals, hay, and various inanimate objects.

Dialogue in Deep Space Nine indicates the existence of portable transporters, but these are never seen. The Next Generation episode "Timescape" features emergency transporter armbands, although these may have served only to activate a remote transporter. To confuse things more, Star Trek: Nemesis featured the prototype "emergency transport unit". Tom Paris uses a portable transporter in the Voyager episode "Non Sequitur". For special effects reasons, in TOS, people generally appear immobilized during transport, with the exception of Kirk in the episode "That Which Survives". However, by TNG, characters can move within the confines of the transporter beam while being transported, although this is rarely shown. Persons being transported are at least sometimes able to perceive the functioning of the transporter while they are in transit. In the TOS episode "The Doomsday Machine", the Enterprise transporter malfunctions while transporting Scotty from the disabled USS Constellation to the Enterprise due to a power drain, and Scotty's pattern is nearly lost in transit. As soon as he successfully materializes, Scotty asks the transporter operator with concern, "What's the matter with that thing?" and orders the transporter to be taken offline for emergency repair.

Some species do not use transporter technology for a variety of reasons. In the first appearance of Trill in the TNG episode "The Host", Trill were unable to be transported, once joined with a symbiont. It seems that was due to the symbiont being detected and removed by the transporter technology as an infestation in the host. Odan, the Trill host in this episode, is reluctant to say why he will not travel this way, and it only becomes apparent that he is carrying a symbiont when he is later injured. All the crew of the Enterprise react as if they have had no contact with this species before. It later becomes apparent that joined Trill have been working in the Federation for some time.

In season three of Star Trek: Discovery, set in the 32nd century, personal transporters are used.

== "Beam me up, Scotty" ==
The famous catchphrase "Beam me up, Scotty" refers to the use of the transporter device to recall a crewmember to the ship; the device was often operated by chief engineer Montgomery Scott during Star Trek: The Original Series. However, it is a slight misquote that was never uttered verbatim on the show.

The closest actual phrase, "Scotty, beam me up", was spoken by Admiral Kirk in Star Trek IV: The Voyage Home (1986). On the special edition DVD of Star Trek IV, the text commentary provided by Michael and Denise Okuda (co-authors of The Star Trek Encyclopedia (1994) and The Star Trek Chronology: The History of the Future) indicates that this was the closest anyone came to using that catchphrase in an official Star Trek production.

== Real-world feasibility ==
In August 2008, physicist Michio Kaku predicted in Discovery Channel Magazine that a teleportation device similar to those in Star Trek would be invented within 100 years. Physics students at University of Leicester calculated that to "beam up" just the genetic information of a single human cell (not the positions of the atoms, just the gene sequences) together with a "brain state" would take 4,850 trillion years assuming a 30 gigahertz microwave bandwidth. A study by Eric Davis for the US Air Force Research Laboratory of speculative teleportation technologies showed that to dematerialize a human body by heating it up to a million times the temperature of the core of the sun so that the quarks lose their binding energy and become massless and can be beamed at the speed of light in the closest physics equivalent to the Star Trek teleportation scenario would require the equivalent of 330 megatons of energy. To meet the information storage and transmission requirements would require current computing capabilities to continue to improve by a factor of 10 to 100 times per decade for 200 to 300 years.

== See also ==
- Personal identity, relating to philosophical discussions of transporting a person
- Replicator
- Technology in Star Trek
- Teletransportation paradox
