= List of fictional elements, materials, isotopes and subatomic particles =

This list contains fictional chemical elements, materials, isotopes or subatomic particles that either a) play a major role in a notable work of fiction, b) are common to several unrelated works, or c) are discussed in detail by independent sources.

== Fictional elements and materials ==
| Name | Source | Notes |
|---|---|---|
| Adamant / Adamantine | Greek mythology | Adamant has long meant any impenetrably or unyieldingly hard substance and, formerly, a legendary stone or mineral of impenetrable hardness and many other properties, often identified with diamond or lodestone. The English word is both a noun and an adjective; from Latin adamans 'impregnable, diamondlike hardness; very firm/resolute position', from Greek adamastos 'untameable' (hence also the word diamond). Adamant or adamantine (suffix -ine 'of the nature of' or 'made of') occur in many works. |
| Adamantium | Marvel Comics | Adamantium is a nigh-indestructible metal that was inadvertently invented by metallurgist Myron MacLain during an attempt to recreate his prior discovery, an alloy of steel and vibranium. Adamantium is used in Wolverine and Lady Deathstrike's claws, Ultron's shell, Bullseye's spine, and some versions of Captain America's shield. Adamantium also appears in the Games Workshop universe of Warhammer 40000 and the MMORPG Maplestory. |
| Administratium | Scientific in-joke | First referenced in a 1989 issue of The Physics Teacher. It was apparently discovered by the fictional Thomas Kyle, who was awarded an Ig Nobel Prize for physics for his discovery, and it is a parody on bureaucracy of scientific establishments and on descriptions of newly discovered chemical elements. |
| Aether | Classical | A classical element referred to as the Fifth Element in ancient and medieval times. It is believed to be the material that fills the region of the universe beyond the terrestrial sphere. This belief goes as far back as Plato's Timaeus, where it is said that "there is the most translucent kind which is called by the name of aether (αἰθήρ)". In Greek Mythology, Aether serves as a counterpart to mortal air that the gods breathed and also serves as a primordial being serving as the personification of the upper sky. |
| Aether | Magic: The Gathering | Aether (previously spelled Æther) is the main type of energy filling the Blind Eternities, the space between planes in the Magic: The Gathering multiverse, though it can also appear in variable quantities within the planes. Inextricably associated with magic in Magic's shared fictional universe and the use of the word in several Magic cards implies that casting magic involves channeling and manipulating Aether. "Summoning" the creatures around which combat and much of gameplay in Magic revolves is described as "pulling (them) from the Aether". |
| Aetherium | Castle in the Sky | Aetherium (referred to as hikouseki in the original Japanese and volucite in the English translation and Streamline English dub version) is a blue element from which the central crystal of Sheeta's necklace is made. Aetherium was mined and processed by an ancient advanced civilization which used it in their technology and weapons. Aetherium has gravity-defying properties; a large aetherium crystal in the heart of the city of Laputa enables it to float in the sky. |
| Atium | Mistborn | In Mistborn by Brandon Sanderson, atium is a powerful "god" metal. It grants the allomantic ability to see the future, the ferochemical ability to store youth, and the hemalurgical ability to steal any power. |
| Azbantium | Doctor Who | A material 400 times harder than diamond in the episode "Heaven Sent". The Twelfth Doctor is cyclically trapped in a pocket universe, continually dying and being recreated. At the end of each cycle he discovers the exit, blocked by an azbantium wall, striking it a few times with his hands before being killed. It is finally broken after 4.5 billion years, compared to the Brothers Grimm story of a bird sharpening its beak on a diamond mountain. |
| Bombastium | Disney | Originally appearing in Uncle Scrooge #17 (1957) by Carl Barks, Bombastium is stated to be the world's rarest element. Very coveted, but its potential use is not fully known. It tastes different every time one tries it. Scientists find that one atom of it dropped into a barrel of water becomes one barrel of ice cream; a different flavor of ice cream each time. To avoid evaporation, bombastium must be kept frozen. Bombastium represents a play on words (bomb and bombastic) that negotiates Cold War hysteria about the arms race and the threat of armageddon due to the hydrogen bomb. Barks' tale is also grounded in fears. The substance is later used in the DuckTales series. |
| Byzanium | Raise the Titanic! | Fictional element in the book Raise the Titanic! and its film adaptation, which is a main focus of the story arc. It is a powerful radioactive material sought by both the Americans and Russians for use as either an energy source for a missile defense system or an atomic superbomb. The largest known natural source of Byzanium was on the island of Novaya Zemlya, which was mined in the early 20th century and supposedly taken aboard the Titanic during its first and only voyage. |
| Cavorite | The First Men in the Moon | In the H. G. Wells novel, a metal created by the physicist Cavor that blocks gravity. Cavor builds a spacecraft out of cavorite, by opening and closing shutters the craft can be steered away or towards different heavenly bodies, somewhat analogous to a "tacking" behavior of a sailed ship. |
| Chelonium | Discworld | According to the wizards at the Unseen University, the species Chelys galactica, including Great A'Tuin, are largely made of this element. Its properties are apparently known to them (but not to the readers of the series's books). |
| Cobalt Thorium G | Dr. Strangelove, Big Guy and Rusty the Boy Robot | In Strangelove, an element used in the Russian doomsday device. Both (real) elements cobalt and thorium can be used in nukes to increase fallout, which agrees with the sense in which "Cobalt Thorium G" is used in the movie. In the "Wages of Fire" episode of Big Guy and Rusty the Boy Robot, it is revealed that the BGY-11 is powered by a Cobalt Thorium G power core. |
| Cutonium | Phineas and Ferb | An element found exclusively on Meap's planet. It appears as a pink liquid that, if consumed or absorb, gives the absorber "cute" properties. The element is used for Meap's people, but not in its pure form. |
| Dalekanium | Doctor Who | A polycarbide material from the Daleks' homeworld of Skaro. Dalekanium is a powerful but unstable explosive that is used in the Daleks' body casings. |
| Dialum | Lego Batman 2: DC Super Heroes | A red chemical, presumably an element, that can be combined with other elements (Promethium, Xenon, Mercury, and Tantalum) to create synthetic "Fake Kryptonite". |
| Dilithium | Star Trek | Dilithium (Li_{2}) exists (two covalently bonded lithium atoms); but something else is referred to in fiction. In Star Trek, dilithium occurs in crystal form and serves as a controlling agent in the matter-antimatter reaction cores used to power the faster-than-light warp drive. In the original series, dilithium crystals are rare and cannot be replicated, making the search for them a recurring plot element. When the crystals appear in the original series they look much like petalite, an important ore of lithium. The name dilithium has led to speculation on whether it is meant as an isotope of lithium or a compound with two lithium atoms. But in a periodic table in a Next Generation episode, it is shown as an element with chemical symbol Dt and atomic number 87, which is in reality francium. Star Trek: The Next Generation Technical Manual gives a chemical formula made of real and fictional elements, instead of treating dilithium as its own element. |
| Duranium | Star Trek | The fictional metal duranium is referred to in many episodes of Star Trek as extremely hard alloys used in starship hulls and hand-held tools. |
| Element Zero | Mass Effect | Also known as "eezo", is a rare material that, when subjected to an electrical current, releases dark energy which can be manipulated into a mass effect field, raising or lowering the mass of all objects within that field. Used as a fuel source for interstellar travel as well as enhancement of humans and aliens alike who were born with Element Zero particles embedded through their nervous system, allowing them to use what is known as 'Biotic' powers. |
| Energon | Transformers | A substance or form of energy serving as the primary fuel source for the Cybertronian/transformer race. It often takes the form of a liquid, most often as "energon cubes" refined from other sources of chemical energy. |
| Fraudulin | Monty Python's Flying Circus | First used in 1970 in the "Crelm Toothpaste" sketch of the season 2 episode "How Not To Be Seen", and again in 1971 when the same sketch was re-released as part of the Pythons' film And Now for Something Completely Different. A chemical of obscure composition, ostensibly a powerful preventative of tooth decay and invariably referred to as "the miracle ingredient, fraudulin", it is a parody of the use of questionably effective "miracle additives" in advertising puffery. |
| Gaulau | Glinda of Oz | In L. Frank Baum's last Oz book, published in 1920, Glinda says that the magical "rare mineral powder called gaulau" is "more wonderful even than radium". The text describes it as "a grayish powder, the tiny grains of which constantly moved as if impelled by some living force". When a magician burns a small amount of gaulau, its magical activity, directed by the correct spoken words or incantations, is capable of powering magical heavy machinery, including an expanding steel column which lifts an entire underwater village (sealed under a glass dome) from the bottom of a large lake to the surface, and holds it at the surface indefinitely, until more gaulau is used to submerge the village again. |
| Gundarium | Mobile Suit Gundam | Gundarium is a lightweight, extremely strong titanium-based alloy with high heat resistance, developed and produced on the Moon for use as mobile-suit armor. The low-gravity environment enabled the specialized processing of titanium; hence its original name Luna Titanium. Following the One Year War, Luna Titanium became commonly known as Gundarium Alloy due to the success of the RX-78-2 Gundam. Later variants included Gundarium α (Alpha), β (Beta), and γ (Gamma). In the After Colony timeline, Gundam Wing features the similarly named Gundanium, a distinct metal that can only be refined in space under zero-gravity conditions. |
| Harbenite | Tarzan at the Earth's Core | Appears in Edgar Rice Burroughs' novel Tarzan at the Earth's Core. Harbenite, named after its discoverer, Dr. von Harben, is a metal found in the fictional African country Urambi and is described as lighter than cork and stronger than steel. Harbenite was used to build the O-220, a dirigible airship built for a rescue mission to the Earth's core in response to a radio distress call from David Innes and Abner Perry, the original discoverers of the inner world of Pellucidar in the novel At the Earth's Core. |
| Inertron | DC Comics | The densest substance in the universe. The walls of the Legion Clubhouse are composed of an inertron alloy. |
| Jerktonium | It's a SpongeBob Christmas! | A green superheavy element. Ingestion of jerktonium causes a bad attitude, but the effects are curable by song. Other side effects of ingesting this element include a fast growth of stubble, a look of fatigue radiated by bags under the eyelids, and thick eyebrows. |
| Jumbonium | Futurama | A rare and valuable element with atoms big enough to be seen by naked eye. In the episode "The Lesser of Two Evils", a Jumbonium atom is used in 3001 for the Miss Universe competition, where it hovers above the prized tiara. According to Bob Barker (in the episode), the atom is worth $200,000 or, at least, somewhere between $200,000 and $200,001. Professor Farnsworth says the nucleus alone is worth $150,000. |
| Katchin | Dragon Ball Z | Said to be the hardest material in the Dragon Ball universe. When testing the Z Sword, Goku throws a cube of Katchin, which was summoned by Supreme Kai, at Son Gohan in order to test the sword's supposed legendary strength. The block of Katchin proceeds to snap the Z Sword when Gohan tries to slice it. |
| Kryptonite | DC Comics | A crystal originating from the planet Krypton that became radioactive when the planet exploded. The radiation is harmful to Kryptonians and fatal over time. Kryptonite comes in various colors with differing effects, and has been variously depicted as an element and compound. |
| Kyber crystal | Star Wars | A rare, semi-sentient, crystalline material found across the galaxy. Kyber crystals vary in shape and color, but all are deeply connected to the Force, the vast energy field connecting all living things. They are most commonly used by the Jedi and Sith in making lightsabers; but larger, rarer crystals are sometimes used in superweapons, including the planet-destroying Death Star. |
| Lerasium | Mistborn | A metal forming the body and power of the shard Preservation that makes any non-allomancer who ingests it an extremely powerful mistborn. All known samples are destroyed after the last was ingested by Elend Venture. It is the source of the Lord Ruler's and the first noble's Allomantic abilities, being found by Rashek at the well of ascension. Its Allomantic, Feruchemic and Hemalurgic powers are unknown. It is named after the holder of Preservation, Leras. |
| Lunarium | Radar Men from the Moon | "More powerful than uranium"; used by men from the Moon. |
| Melange | Dune | A psychedelic drug, that is often referred to simply as "the spice" and is central to the Dune series. |
| Meteorillium | Return to Castle Wolfenstein | Element found in meteors theorized to originate in the center of the galaxy. The Schutzstaffel's Special Projects Division discovers some of the rare element in the Baltic states. Oberführer Strasse's project book indicates that the SS Paranormal Division needs it for the resurrection of King Henry the Fowler. Strasse's lab in Norway refines the metal into its 317 isotope for use in the ceremony. |
| Mithril / Mythril | Various | Originally from Tolkien's The Lord of the Rings. A durable silvery metal; very light and extremely strong. Mithril means "grey gleam", but is translated as "true silver". It is mined in native form in Moria. It can also be worked into other forms with unusual properties such as reflecting only the light of the Moon. The fictional metal has appeared in other fantasy universes, games, and books. "Mythril" appears in the video game series Final Fantasy and Kingdom Hearts. "Mithral" is used in D&D books; "Milrith" in Simon the Sorcerer. In Warhammer, the High Elven metal "Ithilmar" has similar properties and use. In RuneScape it is a lightweight blue metal stronger than steel. In World of Warcraft, mithril and truesilver both appear; truesilver is a rare spawn node in the same areas as mithril. Both can be mined as ore and smelted into a bar using the mining profession. Mithril also appears in the MMORPG Guild Wars 2 as a blueish-silver metal used in crafting. In Defense of the Ancients, the multiplayer online battle arena version of Warcraft, players can buy the Mithril Hammer from the Main Shop. "Mithral" also features in the Dungeon Master series. It appears in armor form in The Elder Scrolls IV: Oblivion. It appears as a cyan metal used to make armor and weapons in MapleStory. Mythril is also depicted as a teal-color metal used to craft armor, weapons, and tools in Terraria. |
| Moustachium | Team Fortress 2 | Yellow metal bars given to people who gained achievements in the game SpaceChem. It can be used to craft items such as fishcake or a SpaceChem pin. |
| Mysterium | Marvel Comics | Platinum silvery in appearance, Mysterium is a meta-material created when loosely formed Kirbons are condensed into singular, varied shapes. The metal is highly durable and has anti-magic properties. |
| Nanite | I Expect You To Die | Yellow liquid with atomic number 13 and symbol Nn; makes a compound that explodes when exposed to air when mixed with Galine, and an antivirus when mixed with Regalite and Sanite. The real element 13 is aluminium. |
| Naquadah | Stargate | First depicted (but not named) as a quartzite-like "mineral" in the original Stargate movie. Naquadah is an extremely dense metallic transuranic element in the island of stability, and is superconducting at room temperature. Rare and valuable, and not occurring naturally in the Solar System, its peculiar properties led to its use as the basis for many advanced technologies, including the Stargates themselves, of which naquadah is the primary constituent. Naquadah greatly amplifies energy, making it extremely potent if paired with explosives. It also occurs in the bloodstream of the Goa'uld, which allows them to control their technology and sense the presence of other symbiotes. The Goa'uld have naquadah mining operations on many planets, and make use of refined naquadah as a form of currency. Naqadah is used in liquid form, to power Goa'uld staff weapons, and heavy liquid naquadah is used to power Goa'uld AG-3 weapon satellites. Naquadah can also be used to create weapons of mass destruction. |
| Naquadria | Stargate | This heavy, unstable isotope of naqahdah is 100 times more powerful, highly radioactive, and does not occur in nature. A very large artificial vein was discovered and mined on Kelowna for use in weapons of mass destruction. It was also used by Stargate Command to power the hyperspace generators on the prototype X-302 and X-303 spacecraft. |
| Netheranium | Marvel Comics | A psycho-sensitive metal originating from Satan's extradimensional plane. Daimon Hellstrom's trident is made of Netheranium, which enables him to fly and manipulate mystical energy. |
| Netherite | Minecraft | A powerful metal, first refined from blocks of "ancient debris" in the Hell-like Nether dimension to obtain netherite scraps, which can then be alloyed with gold to create a usable ingot form. Coating diamond weapons and equipment with the ingot form creates netherite equipment, the most powerful material tier in the game, increasing their durability and preventing them from being destroyed in lava. |
| Nth Metal | DC Comics | A Thanagarian alloy used by Hawkman and Hawkwoman. It can negate gravity and magic, among other properties. In some versions, the Legion of Super-Heroes' flight rings are made of valorium, an alloy containing Nth metal. |
| Octiron | Discworld | A strange, iridescent metal; highly valued. It radiates dangerous amounts of raw enchantment and is so unstable it can only exist in a universe saturated with raw magic. |
| Orichalcum | Mythology of Atlantis | Pink or red metal mined in Atlantis; also called mountain copper. May be based on Auricupride. Powers machinery in Atlantis in the video game Indiana Jones and the Fate of Atlantis. In Exalted, Orichalcum is the strongest of the five magical materials and can be made by distilling ordinary gold using Gaia's blood (Magma) and concentrating sunlight using large occult mirrors. Found in Final Fantasy as a rare material with varying properties. In the Soul Calibur series, Sophitia carries a sword and shield set named Orichalcum. A green metal used in smithing to craft Orcish weapons and armor in The Elder Scrolls V: Skyrim. In Maplestory it is a fuchsia metal used to craft armors and items. In Guild Wars 2, Orichalcum appears as an amber-colored metal used in crafting various things. In Shadowrun, orichalcum is a magical alloy of gold, silver, mercury, and copper. Also named "Orichalcon" in some games. Orichalcum is depicted as a pink metal in Terraria and is used to make weapons, armor, and different walls and blocks. It also appears in Harvest Moon as a resource in multiple entries in the series. In the online game Forge of Empires, it is a golden-brown "special good" which can only be mined undersea during the Oceanic Future and later eras. Also mentioned in the "Biggles" story "The Adventure of the Oxidized Grotto" from Biggles - Charter Pilot (1943). |
| Phostlite | Tintin: The Shooting Star | Extraterrestrial mineral found in a meteorite that lands in the Arctic Ocean. Phostlite accelerates growth and increases size, causing gigantic apple trees to grow from a single apple core and causing insects and spiders to grow to enormous sizes. |
| Polydenum | OtherSpace | A metallic, radioactive, explosive element found in some planetary cores that is mined and refined to become the main fuel for starship sub-light engines in the OtherSpace multiverse, and a potent explosive. |
| Pizzazium Infinionite | Phineas and Ferb | An element with an atomic number of 104, an atomic mass of (261), and atomic symbol PzI on the bottom right corner of the periodic table. It was discovered along the Appalachian Trail in 1896. In the 1970s, people had ideas to use the element in flying cars. The real element 104, rutherfordium, is unstable and its most stable isotope, rutherfordium-267, has a half-life of only 48 minutes. |
| Pizzazium Infinionite | Milo Murphy's Law | An element that appears on the 24/7 Periodic Table channel on the bottom right corner. Doofenshmirtz said that Time Juice (an element that would not be discovered for 7 years) can be placed with Pizzazium Infinionite. |
| Polydichloric euthimal | Outland | Powerful amphetamine. Greatly increases miners' productivity in the British sci-fi thriller Outland. Prolonged use leads to severe psychosis often ending in deadly violence or suicide. In the 1991 American sci-fi action film Terminator 2: Judgment Day, the barrels of explosive used to destroy the Cyberdyne building are labeled "Polydichloric Euthimol" as an in-joke. |
| Protodermis | Bionicle | Artificial substance. Comprises all of the giant robot Mata Nui and the beings that live inside it. Liquid protodermis functions similar to water; solid protodermis can function as earth, stone, or metal. Organic protodermis forms the biological components of the characters. A naturally occurring form, Energized Protodermis, is a silver-colored liquid that is a sapient being, and can transform or destroy any living thing that touches it. |
| Protomolecule | The Expanse | An unusual, exotic substance discovered in Saturn's moon Phoebe by the corporation Protogen. When introduced to living tissue, the protomolecule undergoes strange processes, seeming to deconstruct the life in order to turn it into new structures. With a larger sample of biomass, the complexity of the protomolecule's processes seems to increase, and becomes able to do things that appear to violate the laws of physics, such as accelerating and decelerating objects in defiance of Newton's third law. Ultimately, it is revealed that the protomolecule was a form of self-replicating spacecraft created by a powerful alien civilization billions of years ago, with the goal of assimilating enough biomass to allow the protomolecule to become a massive ring structure that can be used as a wormhole. |
| Pyrholidon | Disco Elysium | A radiation sickness treatment with psychedelic side-effects. Pyrholidon has the same chemical structure as the real drug AEOL-10150. AEOL-10150 is a drug in development designed to treat sulfur mustard and nerve agent exposure, as well as pneumonitis due to acute radiation syndrome. Pyrholidon's in-game description is as follows: "A pretty little puck-shaped cap of purple liquid that can bring on anything from hot flashes to military-grade psychosis. With sufficient tolerance, however, it can make any weather feel balmy – if only for a while." |
| Quantonium | Monsters vs. Aliens | A blue-green luminescent material that is used as fuel. When the protagonist, Susan Murphy, is hit by an asteroid filled with quantonium, she grows to a gigantic size. |
| Radianite | Valorant | Grey crystal-like substance. Has become a major part of Earth's civilization after its discovery. Is used to power and augment much of Earth's technology and is the game's main plot device; one team has to steal large amount of crates containing radianite, while the other team has to defend objectives to keep the opposing team from stealing the crates. It was initially known to be a clean, safe source of energy and something that could inflict supernatural abilities upon certain people who come into contact with it. Known as Radiants, they made up only a relatively small section of the global population and eventually became an accepted part of society. After a disaster in Venice, it is revealed that radianite had more destructive potential, leaving the world questioning how safe radianite actually was. |
| Radium X | The Invisible Ray | Highly radioactive extraterrestrial element discovered by Dr. Janos Rukh. He uses it to create a death beam projector which uses the incredible power of Radium X for a destructive weapon of mass terror. After developing a filter to curb its destructiveness, Rukh also uses it to restore sight to his blind mother with the Radium X projector. According to legend, this scene inspired John H. Lawrence to use radiation on his mother, who had been diagnosed with inoperable uterine cancer. |
| Raysium | The Stormlight Archive | Bright golden metal forming the body and power of the shard Odium that conducts investiture, drawing it in from any source. Used by the forces of Odium to drain Radiants of their stormlight and to transfer spren between gemstones. |
| Rearden Metal | Atlas Shrugged | Greenish-blue alloy containing iron and copper invented by Hank Rearden. Lighter and stronger than traditional steel, it is to steel what steel was to iron. |
| Rebellium | Space: 1999 | Rebellium appears on a computer monitor (VDU) during Episode 24, Series 2, The Dorcons in which Moonbase Alpha is attacked by The Dorcons who are attempting to kidnap Maya who is a Psychon. Rebellium is one of the constituent elements of the Dorcons space craft. |
| Red mercury | Urban legend | Hoax substance of uncertain composition purportedly used in making nuclear bombs. It appears in the films Red Mercury and Red 2. |
| Redstone | Minecraft | A naturally-occurring substance capable of generating and conducting energy similar to electronic circuitry. The player can mine it in a powder form from ore deep underground and use it to build complex logic gate systems or automated resource farms. |
| Regalite | I Expect You To Die | Purple liquid with atomic number 11 and symbol Re that makes a compound that produces clouds when exposed to air when mixed with Arsonium, and an antivirus when mixed with Nanite and Sanite. The real element 11 is sodium; and Re = rhenium. |
| Residuum | Critical Role, The Legend of Vox Machina, The Mighty Nein | A mineral; can enhance arcane powers. Refined from whitestone rocks. During Exandria's Calamity, a fight between the gods created mountains infused with their magic; whitestone is mined from these mountains. Residuum can be further refined into suude – a performance-enhancing drug which improves spellcasting. It first appeared in campaign one of the Dungeons & Dragons web series Critical Role; it later appeared in other Critical Role campaigns and the animated adaptations. Mechanically in the D&D game, residuum can replace expensive components consumed by spells and other arcane rituals. |
| SAM | Satisfactory | Glassy purple/indigo mineral able to manipulate atomic bonds of any matter within physical contact of it when "Reanimated". Used to transform materials, and to progress through alien technology research. (aka. Strange Alien Matter) |
| Sanite | I Expect You To Die | Red liquid with atomic number 17 and the symbol Y. Makes a compound that is corrosive to copper when mixed with Arsonium and Galine, and an antivirus when mixed with Regalite and Nanite. The real element 17 is chlorine and the element with symbol Y is yttrium. |
| Saronite | World of Warcraft | Teal-color metal found in the land of Northrend. Said to be created from the blood of the old god Yogg-Saron. Those who spend a long time in Saronite mines will complain of ghostly whispers and be driven to insanity. This metal is also used by the Scourge and Knights of the Ebon Blade to create armor, though the creators of the game confirmed that using Saronite in armor will not affect the wearer. In the game, Saronite can be used by blacksmiths and engineers to craft rare and epic-quality armor and weapons. |
| SCP-148 | SCP Foundation | Alloy: mainly platinum and iridium, plus several other known metals (including iron, cobalt, and copper) and unidentified matter. SCP-148 (or "telekill") has a passive effect that negates extrasensory perception. Long exposure causes communication disorders; extensive overexposure leads to complete aphasia with no visible signs of brain damage. |
| Scrith | Ringworld | Structural material for Ringworld, with tensile strength on the order of the strong nuclear force. |
| Seastone | One Piece | A rare substance that "gives off a wavelength that is the same as the sea itself", making it, in effect, a solid form of sea. Any person with superhuman powers obtained from a Devil Fruit has said powers temporarily neutralized if they come into contact with Seastone. |
| Septium | Trails | Septium are gemstones that align with one of seven elements: Earth, Fire, Water, Wind, Space, Mirage, and Time. Septium is central to the function of Orbal energy, which can power appliances, vehicles, or channel elemental power in the form of "Arts", magical techniques used in combat. |
| Silver rock stone | Pokémon | A silvery substance, one of the hardest in the Pokémon world, and which only occurs on Silver Rock Isle. The locals sell wing-shaped pin talismans fashioned from silver rock stone. |
| Silverstone | Elemental Assassin | Magic metal that can absorb and negate elemental magic, at the cost of generating heat (melting the metal if it absorbs too much). This ability lets Silverstone be used for both storing magical energy to be used later and to protect people, objects, or structures from mystical attacks. Silverstone is also durable against mundane force, with shooters preferring it to Teflon for armor-piercing bullets. |
| Solaronite | Plan 9 from Outer Space | A substance that explodes sunlight particles. Such an explosion would set off an uncontrollable chain reaction, destroying the universe. This is what the antagonists of the movie seek in their plot to destroy Earth and humanity. |
| Space Titanium | Godzilla vs. Mechagodzilla | Also called "space metal". Strong metal from outer space used by the Black Hole Planet 3 Aliens to create Mechagodzilla. After Godzilla destroys Mechagodzilla, the Black Hole Planet 3 Aliens use this metal to create a second Mechagodzilla in the 1975 sequel Terror of Mechagodzilla. |
| Thiotimoline | Isaac Asimov | Fictional chemical compound. Its major peculiarity is its "endochronicity": it starts dissolving before it makes contact with water. |
| Thirium | Detroit: Become Human | Primarily used for the synthesis of "Blue Blood", a fluid that circulates energy and information inside CyberLife androids. It has a destabilizing effect on hormone production. |
| Tiberium | Command & Conquer | An extraterrestrial crystalline structure, it grows and spreads like a living organism (roots absorb elements of the soil to grow crystals off the ground). The green crystals are made of various minerals such as phosphor and iron and 1.5% of unknown matter. When refined, it can function as a high energy fuel and be turned into both a weapon and building materials with relative ease. It causes various health issues and Tiberium poisoning to anyone in contact with it. Named after the Tiber River where it was first found in 1995. |
| Timonium | Numerous works | In the Liaden universe, the planet Surebleak was once a mining center for timonium before large amounts were discovered in another nearby star system. Timonium is a radioactive element used as an internal power source for high tech devices. The material has also been featured in The Stardust Voyages, and in Rise of Nations: Rise of Legends. |
| Transformium | Transformers: Age of Extinction | A programmable material that the Transformers are made from. |
| Tritanium | Star Trek | The fictional metal tritanium was referred to in many episodes as an extremely hard alloy used in starship hulls and hand-held tools. |
| Tritanium | Eve Online | A versatile material; the primary material used in the construction of virtually all star ships and star ship components. It is described as being unstable at atmospheric temperatures, and thus is only used in constructing objects intended to stay in space permanently. |
| Trellium | Wax and Wayne | Trellium is a silvery red god metal with dark red spots similar to rust. It is the solid form of the Shard Autonomy's power. It is around a 9 on the Mohs Hardness Scale and repels Investiture. Unlike most other god metals in the Cosmere it is not commonly known by name of the vessel of the Shard from which it originates which would make it Bavadinium. Due to its ability to repel Investiture it is used along with Harmonium to create Weapons of Mass Destruction comparable to Thermonuclear weapons. These weapons of mass destruction create Atium and Lerasium as a by-product of their detonation. |
| Truthitonium | The Ambidextrous Universe | Martin Gardner describes Truthitonium as the invention of Ralph Cooper of Los Alamos. It is created momentarily (called a moment of Truth), by annihilating a Truthiton (a proto-proton) with a pseudo electron (a fiction), after which it degenerates releasing 2000 neutrinos and then implodes into nothingness "leaving behind not a particle of Truth". |
| Ultron | Armageddon 2419 A.D. | A synthetic material which is an "absolutely invisible and non-reflective solid of great molecular density and moderate elasticity, which has the property of being 100 percent conductive to those pulsations known as light, electricity and heat". In the novel, the Americans use this technology, combined with Inerton, as well as explosive rockets and radio frequencies the enemy cannot detect, in their struggle with the main antagonists, "The Hans". |
| Unobtainium | Aerospace term | A substance with the exact properties needed for a piece of hardware or other item of use, but not obtainable, either because it theoretically cannot exist, because geopolitical events preclude access to it, or because current technological limitations prevent making it. |
| Unobtainium | Avatar | Unobtanium is also the mineral being sought on Pandora by brute-force mining methods in the film Avatar. It is a room-temperature superconductor. |
| Unobtainium | The Core | A material invented by Dr. Brazzelton, who dubs it "unobtanium" as its technical name has 37 syllables. Unobtanium is able to convert heat and pressure into energy that reinforces its own structure, allowing the construction of a vessel capable of enduring a trip to the Earth's core. In addition, it can also turn heat into electric power. Unobtanium is created by combining unspecified crystals in a tungsten-titanium matrix at low temperatures. |
| Upsidaisium | The Adventures of Rocky and Bullwinkle and Friends | A focus of the second-longest Rocky and Bullwinkle story arc, Upsidaisium, an anti-gravity metal, is much sought after by the US government. Bullwinkle comes to the attention of government agents, as well as spies Boris and Natasha, after inheriting his uncle's Upsidaisium mine. The mine is located in the fictional Mt. Flatten, which floats high in the air due to the high amount of Upsidaisium within. |
| Uridium | Uridium | Fictional metal named in the 1986 computer game Uridium, available for the Commodore 64, ZX Spectrum, BBC Micro, and Amstrad CPC. Each level of the game takes place on a space dreadnought named after a different metal. The last level is named after the fictional element uridium. The cassette inlay card says the name was created by one of the game developers who thought uridium really existed. |
| Uru | Marvel Comics | An extremely durable metal from Asgard that is easily enchanted. Thor and Beta Ray Bill's hammers, Mjolnir and Stormbreaker, are made of Uru. |
| Valkyrium | Pathway | In the 2019 indie game Pathway by Robotality, a large Valkyrium network is believed to extend from the African Atlantic coast to the Caucasus. Known to the ancient Egyptians as Ka and called Valkyrium-500 by the Germans, these green crystals are of unknown origin and were collected by the Nazis for their Projekt Walhalla to unleash the powers of ancient artifacts. |
| Versamina | Storie naturali (Primo Levi) | Versamines are substances that turn pain into pleasure. |
| Verterium cortenide | Star Trek | Has a key role in Star Trek's warp drive propulsion system, since it is described as the only compound able to generate warp fields when given energy from the warp core. The crew of USS Voyager are forced to land on a planet to retrieve verterium cortenide to repair their warp nacelles after a sabotage. |
| Vibranium | Marvel Comics | Vibranium is a rare metallic substance that is theorized to be of extraterrestrial origin and closely associated with Wakanda. It exists in two forms: the Wakandan variety is found only in Wakanda and can absorb energy. The Antarctic variety, known as Anti-Metal, is found in the Savage Land and can produce disintegrating vibrations. |
| Vizorium | Dirty Pair: Project Eden | An extremely rare metal that is illegal and sold by various criminals. It is used to power warp drives. |
| Wapometal | One Piece | An alloy that was inadvertently invented by Wapol when he was turning garbage into toys during his cover story, manufactured via his Munch-Munch Fruit powers. It was this metal that turned him from a homeless bum into a very wealthy CEO of a toy company. |
| Wishalloy | Aerospace term | Alternative to unobtainium; may mean that said substance is theoretically impossible under known scientific theory. Historically scramjets have been described as being made from unobtainium reinforced wishalloy. |
| Wonderflonium | Dr. Horrible's Sing-Along Blog | A substance needed by Dr. Horrible to complete his time-stopping Freeze Ray. A case containing the substance has the admonition "Do Not Bounce", although the reason for this isn't explained. |
| Xirang | Chinese mythology | Magic soil that can self-expand and continually grow. Used to fight against the waters of the Great Flood. |
| Xirdalium | The Chase of the Golden Meteor | Element which is, in the French first edition of the novel, ~100,000 times more radioactive than radium. In the English first edition this is reduced to 100 times. Xirdalium was invented by Jules Verne's son Michel, who introduced it to the novel, together with the character Zephyrin Xirdal, a 'private genius' who synthesized the new element. In the story Xirdal then uses Xirdalium in a contraption emitting a strong tractor beam able to alter the trajectory of the meteor mentioned in the novel's title. |
| Xithricite | Vendetta Online | A bright green mineral used to produce incredibly strong alloys originally discovered by explorers from the Neutral Territories. References to it are found throughout the game's item descriptions. Is used in everything from spaceship hulls to railgun ammunition. Players can mine Xithricite ore from asteroids. |
| X-linked Herculite | Voyage to the Bottom of the Sea (novel) | Harriman Nelson's military-classified transparent metal, sold to the US Navy as battleship hull armor. With the billion-dollar profits, Nelson employed the material as the hull his for "USOS Seaview," a nuclear submarine for scientific research. |
| Z-Crystals | Pokémon | Mysterious crystals to be held by Pokémon and used in battle to upgrade normal moves to Z-Moves. There are 18 Z-Crystals for each type and 17 for specific Pokémon. |
| Zynothium | Teen Titans | A red compound that is highly unstable, dangerous, and rare. Its properties allow it to act as a power source and it powers the Red X suit. |

== Fictional isotopes and allotropes of real elements ==
| Name | Isotope of | Source | Uses | Reality |
|---|---|---|---|---|
| Infernal iron | Iron | Dungeons & Dragons, Baldur's Gate | Described as form of iron found in the Nine Hells in Dungeons & Dragons lore, but a separate metal only superficially similar to iron in Baldur's Gate lore. In both cases, it is used to make various weapons, machines, and magical items of hellish origin, frequently implied to possess abilities relating to the soul or extraction thereof. | Iron has 4 stable isotopes of atomic masses 54, 56, 57, and 58, with ^{56}Fe comprising over 90% of the metal on earth. |
| Stygian Iron | Iron | Rick Riordan works | A type of iron mined in the Underworld and forged in the River Styx. Unlike Celestial Bronze and Imperial Gold, monsters killed by it cannot reform, and it can kill non-magical creatures as well as magical creatures. | Iron has 4 stable isotopes of atomic masses 54, 56, 57, and 58, with ^{56}Fe comprising over 90% of the metal on earth. |
| ^{80}Ir | Iridium | Riptide | According to the book, one second of direct exposure is equivalent to a lethal dose, with a reading of 3217.89 Rads/hr from 15 metres away. The blade of St. Michael's sword was forged from it. | ^{80}Ir does not exist; the lightest known isotope is ^{164}Ir. |
| ^{186}Pu | Plutonium | The Gods Themselves | Isotope of plutonium; too unstable to exist in our world, but exists naturally in fictional parallel universes whose strong nuclear force is stronger. This is used as a source of energy where turned into ^{186}W, releasing electrons in the process. | Lightest known isotope of plutonium: ^{227}Pu. |
| Promethium | Promethium | DC Comics | Promethium is an artificial element created by Steve Dayton that has two variants: "depleted" and "volatile". Depleted Promethium is used in Deathstroke and Cyborg's armor. Volatile Promethium can generate near-limitless energy and possesses mutagenic properties. | Promethium has no stable isotopes. |
| Quadium | Hydrogen | The Mouse That Roared by Leonard Wibberley | Hydrogen isotope ^{4}H. Fissionable; explosive potential many times greater than plutonium. Quadium is discovered by Dr. Kokintz who uses it to build the "Q-Bomb", a doomsday device that can destroy all life on Earth. A madcap series of events results in the Q-Bomb being captured by the anachronistically medieval army of the Duchy of Grand Fenwick turning this tiny and technologically backward European country into the most powerful nation on Earth. Grand Fenwick then uses the threat of the Q-Bomb to force the nuclear powers to accept a nuclear disarmament agreement. In the end Dr. Kokintz discovers the Q-Bomb is actually a dud, but decides it is in the best interest of humanity to keep this fact a secret. | Hydrogen-4 has been proven to exist, but is extremely unstable, with a half-life of 1.39(10)×10^{−22} s and decaying into tritium via neutron emission. |
| Quantium | Any element, but most commonly potassium | Babylon 5 | Rare and expensive; used in jumpgates; forms when ordinary matter is subject to the stresses of a supernova, pushing some of its electron pair-bonds into hyperspace. The most commonly found form derives from ^{40}K, giving quantium-40. The name was coined by David Strauss in response to a request from the show's creator. | ^{40}K is a natural isotope, used to date rocks. But the method of getting quantium as described has not been shown in real life. |
| Whispering Iron | Iron | Locke and Key | A black form of iron created when a demon passes through the Black Door but does not impact (and therefore possess) a human. This iron can be used by certain members of the Locke family to create special keys with powers based on the intent of the creator. Whispering iron is also used to create magical artifacts such as the mending cabinet. | |
| Xenonite | Xenon | Project Hail Mary | Xenonite, created by the alien Eridians, is a metal with varying types. Made primarily of the noble gas xenon, it can be used for building, engineering, and much more. It has virtually unlimited tensile strength; a wide variety of colors, including transparent and tan; and even different textures. The metal is unusual in that it is composed of a noble gas, which does not typically form strong molecular structures. | Xenon only forms a translucent crystalline solid under 161.4 K (−111.7 °C; −169.2 °F) at standard pressure, and even then is too brittle to work with. |

== Fictional subatomic particles ==
| Name | Source | Properties |
|---|---|---|
| Akiva | SCP Foundation | Radiation linked to prayer and divine intervention. A place with high levels of Akiva radiation has been visited or touched by a god, while a place with low Akiva radiation may be considered forgotten or forsaken by the gods. Named after a Jewish scholar and religious leader, the Rabbi Akiva. |
| Chronoton (or chroniton) | Various | From Greek χρόνος (Chronos, 'time') + -ον (-on, 'elementary particle'). Associated with manipulating or traveling through time in Star Trek; and in Futurama, where it also has rejuvenating effects. A chronoton bomb in Teen Titans destroys chronotons in a given area, stopping that area's progression through time. The material has also been featured in Mighty Morphin Power Rangers. |
| Dust | His Dark Materials | Elementary particle; the basic unit of consciousness. Not a constant, but is generated by and gives sentience to animals in a positive feedback loop. The human brain is a focusing mechanism for Dust. The more conscious the entity, the more Dust is around it. Permeates all universes and passes among dimensions. |
| Kingon (queons) | Discworld | A faster than ordinary light elementary particle by which 'kingship' is passed from monarch to monarch. There can not be more than one king existing at the same time, with no gaps between kings. Therefore kingons or queons transfer the rights instantaneously. |
| Kirbons | Marvel Comics | Primordial minutia element that has been posited straight from the realm beyond Mystery, overarching the Far Shore and the White Hot Room where the Phoenix Force resides. These particles govern the size, mass, and density of most forms of matter, and can be found in certain radiological spectra like gamma rays, X-rays, cosmic rays, and Pym Particles. They often popularly feature whenever certain superpowers are used by various imprint characters, manifesting as the titular Kirby Krackle. |
| Parker Particles | Marvel Comics | Parker Particles are a form of energy discovered by Peter Parker that are tied to the universe's expansion and thus possess theoretically infinite power. Young hero Alpha gained his powers after being exposed to Parker Particles during a school trip. |
| Philote | Ender's Game | Smallest possible particle; occupies no space at all. All philotes are interconnected by quantum entanglement, and philotic energy can be harnessed to allow for instant communication and near-instant travel to anywhere in the universe. |
| Philosophon | Flatterland | Unit of logic so tiny only a philosopher could hope to split it. |
| Pym Particles | Marvel Comics | Pym Particles are particles discovered by Hank Pym that can manipulate the size, resiliency, and mass of objects and people. It is used by Pym, his partner Wasp, and Goliath, among others. It is rumored to be a key component to unlocking a dormant superpower sequestered amongst humanity called the Destiny Force. |
| Reson | Discworld | The constitute particle of the Thaum, akin to the real-life quark. Its name literally means "thing-ies". It comes in 5 "flavours" or types: Up, Down, Sideways, Sex-Appeal and Peppermint. |
| Tachyon | Many examples; see Tachyons in fiction | A tachyon is anything that travels faster than light. In many fictional settings it is taken that this involves time travel and they are invoked as an integral part of, or even shorthand for, time travel devices. |
| Thaum | Discworld | The basic unit of magical strength; the amount of magic needed to create one small white pigeon or three normal-sized billiard balls. The Thaum has been shown to be made up of Resons in the Unseen University's High Energy Magic Building. |

== See also ==
- Computronium
- Neutronium
- List of discredited substances
- List of Star Trek materials
