= Technology in Star Trek =

The fictional technology in Star Trek has borrowed many ideas from the scientific world. Episodes often contain technologies named after or inspired by real-world scientific concepts, such as tachyon beams, baryon sweeps, quantum slipstream drives, and photon torpedoes. Some of the technologies created for the Star Trek universe were done so out of financial necessity. For instance, the transporter was created because the limited budget of Star Trek: The Original Series (TOS) in the 1960s did not allow expensive shots of spaceships landing on planets.

Discovery Channel Magazine stated that cloaking devices, faster-than-light travel, and dematerialized transport were only dreams at the time TOS was made, but physicist Michio Kaku believes all these things are possible. William Shatner, who portrayed James T. Kirk in TOS, believes this as well, and went on to co-write the book I'm Working on That, in which he investigates how Star Trek technology is becoming feasible.

== Subspace ==
In the Star Trek fictional universe, subspace is a feature of space-time that facilitates faster-than-light transit, in the form of interstellar travel or the transmission of information. Faster-than-light warp drive travel via subspace obeys different laws of physics. The name "subspace" has also been adopted and used in other fictional settings, such as the Stargate franchise, The Hitchhiker's Guide to the Galaxy series, the Bobiverse series, and Descent: Freespace. Narratively, it plays a similar role to the hyperspace that appears in Star Wars and other works of science fiction.

In most Star Trek series, subspace communications are a means to establish nearly instantaneous contact with people who are light years away. The physics of Star Trek describes infinite speed (expressed as "warp factor 10") as an impossibility; as such, even subspace communications which travel at speeds over Warp 9.9 may take hours or weeks to reach certain destinations. One exception to this impossibility was in the Star Trek: Voyager episode "Threshold" where Lt. Paris breaks the Warp 10 barrier. In the Star Trek universe subspace signals do not degrade with the square of the distance as do other methods of communication using conventional bands of the electromagnetic spectrum (i.e. radio waves), so signals sent from a great distance can be expected to reach their destination at a predictable time and with little relative degradation (barring any random subspace interference or spatial anomalies).

In the Star Trek franchise, subspace communications have a limit of just over 20 light years before they must be boosted, although this limitation has been ignored in several storylines, such as when the crew of the USS Voyager establishes real-time communication networks directly with Starfleet Command across the Delta Quadrant.

== Warp drive ==
Warp drive is one of the fundamental features of the Star Trek franchise; in the first pilot episode of Star Trek: The Original Series, "The Cage", it is referred to as a "hyperdrive", with Captain Pike stating the speed to reach planet Talos IV as "time warp, factor 7". When beginning to explain travel times to the illusion survivors (before being interrupted by the sight of Vina), crew member Jose Tyler stated that "the time barrier's been broken", allowing a group of interstellar travelers to return to Earth far sooner than would have otherwise been possible. Later in the pilot, when Spock is faced with the only action of escaping, he announces to the crew they have no choice but to leave, stating "Our time warp factor ..." before the ship's systems start failing. In the second pilot for The Original Series, "Where No Man Has Gone Before", time was dropped from the speed setting with Kirk ordering speeds in the simple "ahead warp factor one" that became familiar from then on.

=== Working principle ===
A visualization of a warp field—the ship rests in a bubble of normal space.

The basic functional principle of the warp drive in Star Trek is the same for all spaceships. It was originally conceived of by a strong energy source, usually called a warp core or sometimes intermix chamber, generates a high-energy plasma. This plasma is transported to warp field generators via lines that are reminiscent of pipes. These generators are effectively coils in warp nacelles protruding from the spaceship. The warp nacelles generate a subspace field, the warp field or a warp bubble, which distort space-time and propels the bubble and spaceship in the bubble forward. That is similar to the Alcubierre drive, but with some exceptions as the maintenance of sub-light velocity and inertia. This means that a spaceship does not come to a complete standstill after the warp flight, but that superluminal and subluminal speeds flow directly into one another. It is also possible to ram another object at warp speed that is outside the warp bubble. This necessitates the existence of fictional deflector shields that protect the spacecraft from damage from collisions with interstellar dust particles and asteroids. The Star Trek: Deep Space Nine episode "By Inferno's Light" indicates that flying at warp speed inside a planetary system is not recommended.

The warp core can be designed in various forms. Humans and most of the other fictional races use a moderated reaction of antideuterium and deuterium with Dilithium. The Romulans, however, use artificial micro-black holes called quantum singularities.

=== Fictional history ===
The episode "Metamorphosis", from The Original Series, establishes a backstory for the invention of warp drive on Earth, in which Zefram Cochrane discovered the "space warp". Cochrane is repeatedly referred to afterwards, but the exact details of the first warp trials were not shown until the second Star Trek: The Next Generation movie, Star Trek: First Contact. The movie depicts Cochrane as having first operated a warp drive on Earth in 2063. This successful first trial led directly to first contact with the Vulcans.

It was also established that many other civilizations had warp drive before humans; First Contact co-writer Ronald D. Moore suggested Cochrane's drive was in some way superior to forms which existed beforehand, and was gradually adopted by the galaxy at large.

The following table shows the gradual evolution of the warp drive and the warp speeds of humanity and later the United Federation of Planets. For better comparison, the warp factors of the TNG scale, based on the values given in the book Star Trek Encyclopedia, have been converted to cubic warp factors from TOS.

| Era (Starship) | Design speed (equivalent to the aircraft V_{NE} V-speed) | Normal cruising speed (equivalent to the aircraft V_{BE} or V_{BR} V-speed) | Maximum cruising speed (equivalent to the aircraft V_{NO} V-speed) | Speed records |
|---|---|---|---|---|
| 2063 (Starship Phoenix) | Warp 1 | experimental spacecraft with flight time limitation of the engine | spacecraft propulsion with flight time limitation of the engine | |
| 2140 (NX-Alpha) | Warp 2 | experimental spacecraft with flight time limitation of the engine | experimental spacecraft with flight time limitation of the engine | Warp 2.2 (ENT episode First Flight) |
| 2143 (NX-Beta) | Warp 2.5 | experimental spacecraft with flight time limitation of the engine | experimental spacecraft with flight time limitation of the engine | |
| 2145 (NX-Delta) | Warp 3 | experimental spacecraft with flight time limitation of the engine | experimental spacecraft with flight time limitation of the engine | |
| 2145 (Starship Franklin) | Warp 4 | Warp 3.5 | Warp 4 | |
| 2151 (Starship Enterprise NX-01) | Warp 5.2 | Warp 4.5 | Warp 5 | Warp 6.9 (ENT episode E²) |
| 2161 (USS Essex NCC-173) | Warp 7 | Warp 5 | Warp 6 | |
| 2245 (USS Enterprise NCC-1701) | Warp 8 | Warp 5 | Warp 6 | Warp 9.5 (TOS episode Is There in Truth No Beauty?); Warp 10 (TOS episode Let That Be Your Last Battlefield); Warp 11 (TOS episode By Any Other Name and The Changeling); Warp 14.1 (TOS Episode That Which Survives) |
| 2285 (USS Enterprise NCC-1701-A) | Warp 12 | Warp 6 | Warp 8 | |
| 2293 (USS Enterprise NCC-1701-B) | Warp 12 (9.2 TNG) | Warp 7 (6 TNG) | Warp 10 (8 TNG) | |
| 2332 (USS Enterprise NCC-1701-C) | Warp 12 (9.3 TNG) | Warp 7 (6 TNG) | Warp 11 (8.6 TNG) | |
| 2363 (USS Enterprise NCC-1701-D) | Warp 12.5 (9.6 TNG); Warp 14.5 (Upgrade to 9.9 TNG) | Warp 7 (6 TNG) | Warp 12 (9.2 TNG) | Warp 14 (9.8 TNG) (TNG episode Encounter at Farpoint) |
| 2371 (USS Enterprise NCC-1710-E; USS Voyager NCC-74656; USS Defiant NX-74205) | Warp 17 (USS Enterprise 9.95 TNG); Warp 18.5 (USS Voyager 9.975 TNG; Warp 19 (USS Defiant 9.982 TNG) | Warp 10 (8 TNG) | Warp 12.5 (USS Defiant 9.5 TNG); Warp 13 (USS Enterprise 9.7 TNG); Warp 13.5 (USS Voyager 9.75 TNG) | Warp 20 (9.99 TNG) (VOY episode Threshold) |
| 2374 (USS Prometheus NX-74913) | Warp 20 (9.99 TNG) | Warp 11.5 (9 TNG) | Warp 14.5 (9.9 TNG) | |

=== Warp speeds ===
==== Original warp scale (The Original Series, The Animated Series, Enterprise, and Discovery) ====
Warp effect as depicted in Star Trek: The Original Series

Warp effect as depicted in Star Trek: The Next Generation

The warp drive velocity in Star Trek is generally expressed in "warp factor" units, which—according to Star Trek Star Fleet Technical Manual—corresponds to the magnitude of the warp field. Achieving warp factor 1 is equal to breaking the light barrier, while the actual velocity corresponding to higher factors is determined using an ambiguous formula. According to the Star Trek episode writer's guide for The Original Series, warp factors are converted to multiples of the speed of light by multiplication with the cubic function of the warp factor itself. Accordingly, "warp 1" is equivalent to the speed of light, "warp 2" is eight times the speed of light, "warp 3" is 27 times the speed of light, etc. Several episodes of The Original Series placed the Enterprise in peril by having it travel at high warp factors. However, the velocity (in present dimensional units) of any given warp factor is rarely the subject of explicit expression, and travel times for specific interstellar distances are not consistent through the various series. In the Star Trek: The Next Generation Technical Manual it was written that the real warp speed depends on external factors such as particle density or electromagnetic fields and only roughly corresponds with the calculated speed of current warp factor. The reference work Star Trek Maps established the theory of subspace (or warp) highways. In certain regions, a spaceship can fly at a multiple of the speed that corresponds to the current warp factor.

In The Original Series, warp factor 6 was established as the common speed of the USS Enterprise NCC-1701. In some cases, the starship traveled at warp 7 or above, but with risk of damaging the ship or the engines. Warp 8 in The Original Series was the "never exceed" speed for the hulls and engines of Constitution-class starships. Warp 6 was the maximum safe cruising speed for that vessel class.

Later on, a prequel series titled Star Trek: Enterprise describes the warp engine technology as a "Gravimetric Field Displacement Manifold" (Commander Tucker's tour, "Cold Front") and describes the device as being powered by a matter/anti-matter reaction which powers the two separate nacelles (one on each side of the ship) to create a displacement field. Enterprise, set in 2151 and onward, follows the voyages of the first human ship capable of traveling at warp factor 5.2, which under the old warp table formula (the cube of the warp factor times the speed of light), is about 140 times the speed of light (i.e., 5.2 cubed). In the series pilot episode "Broken Bow", Capt. Archer equates warp 4.5 to "Neptune and back [from Earth] in six minutes" (which would correspond to a distance of 547 light-minutes or 66 au, consistent with Neptune's being a minimum of 29 au distant from Earth).

==== Modified warp scale (The Next Generation, Deep Space Nine, Voyager, and Picard) ====
For Star Trek: The Next Generation and the subsequent series, Star Trek artist Michael Okuda drew up a new warp scale and devised a formula based on the original one but with an important difference: In the half-open interval from 9 to 10, the exponent w increases toward infinity. Thus, in the Okuda scale, warp velocities approach warp 10 asymptotically. According to the Star Trek: The Next Generation Technical Manual there is no exact formula for this interval because the quoted velocities are based on a hand-drawn curve; what can be said is that at velocities greater than warp 9, the form of the warp function changes because of an increase in the exponent of the warp factor w. Due to the resultant increase in the derivative, even minor changes in the warp factor eventually correspond to a greater than exponential change in velocity. Warp factor 10 was set as an unattainable maximum of a theoretical infinite speed, at which an object would occupy all points in the universe simultaneously (according to the new scale, reaching or exceeding warp 10 required an infinite amount of energy). This is described in Star Trek Technical Manuals as "Eugene's limit", in homage to creator/producer Gene Roddenberry.

As stated in the collection Star Trek Fact Files, no ship, including highly developed ships like the Borg cube, may exceed warp factor 9.99 with their normal warp drive. To achieve higher speeds, the use of transwarp technology is required.

==== Warp velocities ====
In the book Star Trek Encyclopedia and the compilation Star Trek Fact Files, some warp velocities are given directly. For comparison, the following table shows these values and also the calculated speeds of the original warp scale, the calculated speeds of a simplified Okuda scale and some reference values for warp speeds from onscreen sources.

| Warp factor | Warp scale from Encyclopedia directly given values (Michael Okuda) | Cubic warp scale v = w^{3}c (Franz Joseph) | Revised warp scale v = w^{10/3}c (Michael Okuda) | Onscreen Reference |
| Warp factor | (Multiple of speed of light) | | | Onscreen Reference |
|---|---|---|---|---|
| 1 | 1× | 1× | 1× | |
| 2 | 10× | 8× | 10× | In the Star Trek: Enterprise episode "Dead Stop", it is said that Enterprise would take about a decade (10 years) to travel 130 light years at warp 2. Thus warp 2 corresponds to about 13 times the speed of light. |
| 3 | 39× | 27× | 39× | In Star Trek: The Next Generation - "The Most Toys" (S3:E22, at 35:38) the crew of Enterprise-D discovers that the android Data may have been stolen while on board another ship - the Jovis. At this point the Jovis, which has a maximum warp factor of 3, has had a 23-hour head start, which Ensign Crusher's calculation puts her anywhere within a 0.102 light year radius of her last known position. Thus, warp 3 is 38.875 times the speed of light. |
| 4 | 102× | 64× | 102× | In the Star Trek: Voyager episode "Resolutions", it is said that a Voyager shuttle would need about 700 years of flight time for a 70,000 light-year journey back to Earth. It follows that warp 4, the stated maximum speed of the shuttle, is about 100 times the speed of light. In the movie Star Trek Beyond it is stated that the USS Franklin (NX-326) was the first Earth ship who was capable of warp 4. Montgomery Scott (Simon Pegg): "This is the USS Franklin, sir, can you believe it? First Earth ship capable of warp 4." It is unclear when the Franklin was first launched but it is speculated to be between 2145 and 2151. |
| 4.5 | 150× | 91× | 150× | In the Star Trek: Enterprise pilot "Broken Bow", Commander Tucker states "warp 4.5 next Thursday", to which Captain Archer responds "Neptune and back in six minutes". The distance from Earth to Neptune varies all the time as both planets orbit the Sun, however the average distance between the two is around 30.63 au (4.58 billion km) and 29.76 au (4.45 billion km) average 4.52 billion km. Therefore, a round trip of 9.04 billion km in six minutes would imply that warp 4.5 is about 84 times the speed of light. |
| 5 | 213× | 125× | 213× | In the Star Trek: Enterprise episode "The Expanse", Captain Archer says the flight to the Delphic Expanse is equivalent to a three-month trip. Upon arrival of the Enterprise, the distance to Earth is given as 50 light years. Thus, warp 5, the maximum speed of the Enterprise, corresponds to about 200 times the speed of light. |
| 6 | 392× | 216× | 392× | |
| 7 | 656× | 343× | 656× | In the Star Trek: Enterprise episode "E²", the Enterprise will fly through an 11.6 light year long subspace corridor for a meeting with Degra. However, the Enterprise is thrown 117 years into the past. As the older Enterprise encounters their younger counterpart (to warn them), Captain Lorian suggests modifying the warp drive so that the younger Enterprise can briefly reach warp factor 6.9 and cover this distance in about two days without using the corridor. Thus, warp 6.9 corresponds to about 2117 times the speed of light. In the Star Trek: Discovery episode "New Eden" (S2:E2), Commander Michael Burnham says a signal "is in the Beta Quadrant, 51,450 light years away," to which Captain Christopher Pike replies, "at top speed that would take us 150 years to get that far," indicating the maximum speed of the Discovery is 343 times the speed of light (51,450 light years / 150 years). That corresponds to warp 7 of the original warp scale. |
| 8 | 1024× | 512× | 1024× | |
| 9 | 1516× | 729× | 1516× | In the episode Bloodlines from the series Star Trek: The Next Generation, Riker claims that the Enterprise would need around 20 minutes for a 300 billion kilometer flight at warp 9. Thus warp 9 corresponds to a speed of 900 billion kilometers per hour (= 250 million kilometers per second) or about 830 times the speed of light. |
| 9.9 | 21,400x | 970× | 2083× | In the episode "The 37's" from the Star Trek: Voyager series warp 9.9 is directly mentioned in a dialog with four billion miles per second (6.4 billion kilometers per second), which is around 21,400 times faster than the speed of light. |
| 10 | Infinite velocity | 1000× | 2154× | In the episode "Threshold", Tom Paris breaks the warp 10 threshold, but travel beyond the threshold is later discovered to be unacceptably hazardous to biological life. In the episode "Where No One Has Gone Before" the Traveler's modifications to the Enterprise-D's propulsion system allowed the Enterprise to travel 2.7 million light years from the Milky Way Galaxy to M 33, effectively blowing past several smaller galaxies, in a few minutes, which according to La Forge, was off the charts, surpassing Warp 10 of the known scale. According to the Technical Manual the authors estimated the speed of this episode at warp factor 9.9999999996. Upon further modification, the Enterprise-D was thrown over a billion light years into an uncharted place in the universe in a matter of seconds with a warp factor that is, according to Data, no greater than 1.5. |
| 11 | Beyond scale | 1331× | 2960× | In episode "The Changeling" the Enterprise briefly reached warp factor 11, as a result of Nomad's "correction of inefficiencies" in the antimatter control system. In the episode "By Any Other Name" the Kelvans modified the Enterprise's engines for greater sustained speed of warp factor 11 to travel from the Milky Way Galaxy to the Andromeda Galaxy. |
| 12 | Beyond scale | 1728× | 3956× | |
| 13 | Beyond scale | 2197× | 5166× | In the alternative future depicted in "All Good Things ...", the series finale of The Next Generation, the "future" Enterprise-D travels at warp 13, perhaps as a result of another reconfiguration of the warp scale. |
| 14 | Beyond scale | 2744× | 6613× | At one point in "That Which Survives" the Enterprise traveled at a warp factor of 14.1. |
| 15 | Beyond scale | 3375× | 8323× | |
| 18.56 | Beyond scale | 6395× | 16928× | According to Gene Roddenberry's first concept script Star Trek is ..., the original Enterprise had a maximum speed of 0.73 light years per hour, which is about 6395 times the speed of light. This corresponds with warp factor 18.56 of the cubic scale. |

=== Transwarp ===
Transwarp generally refers to speeds and technologies that are beyond conventional warp drives. The warp drive has a natural physical or economical limit beyond which higher speeds are no longer possible. The reference work Star Trek Fact Files indicates this limit at warp factor 9.99. This is the highest conventional warp speed mentioned for a spaceship (Borg cube). Also in the episode Threshold (Star Trek Voyager) the warp factor 9.99 is suggested as the limit. This is the last warp factor mentioned before the leap takes place in the transwarp state.

In the book Star Trek: The Next Generation Technical Manual the authors describe the idea of transwarp:

Finally, we had to provide some loophole for various powerful aliens like Q, who have a knack for tossing the ship million of light years in the time of a commercial break. .. This lets Q and his friends have fun in the 9.9999+ range, but also lets our ship travel slowly enough to keep the galaxy a big place, and meets the other criteria.

The transwarp concept itself is not tied to any particular technology or speed limit. Variants of transwarp are:

Space folding

  - coaxial warp drive
  - Rutian Inverter
  - Sikarian spatial trajector

Hyperspace

  - quantum slipstream
  - Vaadwaur subspace corridors (underspace)
  - Xindi subspace vortex
  - Borg transwarp conduits

Wormholes

  - geodesic fold
  - intermittent cyclical vortex
  - interspatial fissure
  - interspatial flexure
  - spatial flexure
  - spatial vortex

== Medical technology ==
Technology plays an important part of the advanced medicine shown in Star Trek. It is often based on selective current or even outdated concepts projected into the future. Examples are:

- Hypospray
- Tricorder
- VISOR
- Emergency Medical Hologram

== See also ==
- Ansible
- Time travel in fiction

=== Star Trek technologies ===
- Cloaking device
- Communicator (original seen in TOS; similar to the modern-day mobile phone)
- Holodeck
- Replicator
- Tractor beam
- Transporter
- Universal translator
