= Man of the People (Star Trek: The Next Generation) =

- Star Trek: The Next Generation episode
- Episode no.: Season 6 Episode 3
- Directed by: Winrich Kolbe
- Written by: Frank Abatemarco
- Production code: 229
- Original air date: October 5, 1992

Guest appearances
- Chip Lucia - Ves Alkar; Patti Yasutake - Alyssa Ogawa; George D. Wallace - Simons; Lucy Boryer - Janeway; Susan French - Sev Maylor; Rick Scarry - Jarth; Stephanie Erb - Liva; J.P. Hubbell - Ensign; Majel Barrett - Computer Voice

Episode chronology
← Previous "Realm of Fear"	Next → "Relics"
- Star Trek: The Next Generation season 6

"Man of the People" is the 129th episode of the American science fiction television series Star Trek: The Next Generation and the third episode of the sixth season.

Set in the 24th century, the series follows the adventures of the Starfleet crew of the Federation starship Enterprise-D. In this episode, which is a riff on the Oscar Wilde novel The Picture of Dorian Gray, a visiting diplomat uses Deanna Troi as a receptacle for unpleasant emotions.

== Plot ==
The Enterprise comes to the aid of the Federation transport Dorian, under attack by two ships, saving its crew and passenger, Lumerian ambassador Ramid Ves Alkar. Starfleet orders the Enterprise to transport Alkar the rest of the way to the Rekag/Seroni system, where he is to mediate negotiations between the two planets. Alkar is accompanied by an old woman named Sev Maylor whom he identifies as his mother. Counselor Troi and Alkar quickly form a friendship, but this causes Maylor to become bitterly hostile towards Troi. Soon, Maylor succumbs to an unknown condition and dies; Alkar appears unmoved by the loss but still requests a funeral ceremony along with Troi, having them touch "funeral stones" as part of the process. Dr. Crusher requests to autopsy the body due to high levels of neurotransmitter residue, but Alkar denies it, asserting it would violate Lumerian custom.

As the Enterprise continues, Troi makes sexual advances towards Alkar, who refuses her. She then attempts to seduce members of the crew, putting her relationship with Commander Riker at odds. Troi also shows signs of rapid aging. When they arrive at Seronia, Troi becomes even angrier when she discovers Alkar working with Liva, another female in Alkar's delegation that had already arrived on the planet. After Alkar refuses to let Troi come with him to the planet, Troi attempts to attack him with a knife, but is stopped and brought to Sick Bay.

The visibly aged Troi shows similar high levels of neurotransmitter residue as Dr. Crusher found in Maylor's body, and with this new evidence, Picard allows her to perform the autopsy on Maylor. Dr. Crusher finds that the body is that of a thirty-year-old woman, and Maylor had no genetic relation with Alkar. Picard confronts Alkar on the planet about this finding. Alkar reveals to Picard that he has the ability to channel his negative emotions into another person, a "receptacle", which allows him to be clear-minded and level-headed as a negotiator. Alkar is aware this causes accelerated aging and death of the receptacles within a few years, and had not foreseen Troi's rapid symptoms when he chose her as his next receptacle.

With Alkar showing no remorse for his actions, Picard and Dr. Crusher devise a means to rescue Troi. Dr. Crusher induces deathlike symptoms in Troi, which breaks the link with Alkar. Alkar returns to the ship to acknowledge Troi's death, and then seeks out Liva, looking to make her the next receptacle. Just as Alkar starts the process, Dr. Crusher revives Troi and purges the neurotransmitter residue from her system; this has an immediate impact on Alkar as he tries to finish the channeling ritual. Picard has Liva beamed out of Alkar's quarters, leaving the man alone to suffer from years of repressed emotions. He ages quickly and dies. Troi is able to make a full recovery, gaining her former youthful appearance and her original personality.

== Reception ==
In 2017, Screen Rant ranked "Man of the People" the ninth thematically-darkest episode, from all 725 episodes of the Star Trek franchise's six then-existing television series, spread across 30 television seasons. The review stated that, at a time when the show makers were not allowed to explore rape, the villain uses his position of power to victimize women, dumping his bad feelings on his assistants, using them as expendable; but in the episode Troi is saved and the negativity cycles back to Alkar killing him.

In 2019, Screen Rant noted that the episode's IMDb rating, 5.8 out of 10 at that time, ranked "Man of the People" as the sixth worst episode of Star Trek: The Next Generation.

== Releases ==
The episode was released as part of the Star Trek: The Next Generation season six DVD box set in the United States on December 3, 2002. A remastered HD version was released on Blu-ray optical disc, on June 24, 2014.

== See also ==
- Adaptations of The Picture of Dorian Gray
