= Star Trek: The Next Generation Technical Manual =

Star Trek companion book

- Cover
- Author: Rick Sternbach and Michael Okuda
- ISBN: 0-671-70427-3
- OCLC: 24648561
- Dewey Decimal: 791.45/72 20
- LC Class: PN1992.77.S73 S78 1991
- Followed by: Star Trek: Deep Space Nine Technical Manual

Star Trek: The Next Generation: Technical Manual (ST:TNG TM) is a paperback reference guide detailing the inner and other workings of the fictional Federation starship Enterprise-D and other aspects of technology that appeared in the television series Star Trek: The Next Generation.

Authored by Rick Sternbach and Michael Okuda, who both worked in the art department on the television series, with a foreword by series creator Gene Roddenberry, the first and only edition was published in 1991 (ISBN 0-671-70427-3) by Pocket Books, and Paramount Pictures holds all copyrights.

== Background and contents ==
The ST:TNG TM is written from the perspective of the 24th century, where TNG is set; it also contains a wealth of behind-the-scenes trivia distinguishable from the technical content. The work is considered by Paramount to be canon in many respects, although some elements first published in the manual have not yet made it onto screen.

Some ideas developed for the technical manual, or its predecessor, the internal Writers Technical Manual, were later incorporated into the storylines of the TV series and movies. Most notably, a concept drawing from the manual describing an emergency landing of the saucer section was seen by TNG writers Ronald D. Moore, Jeri Taylor, and Brannon Braga who wanted to use a saucer crash as a sixth-season cliffhanger episode for the TV series. This idea was shelved due to budget limitations and resistance from producer Michael Piller. However, Moore and Braga later included the scenario in Star Trek Generations. Also first seen in the technical manual were the Nova-class starship and the USS Galaxy.

The book contains explanations of Warp drive (including a chart showing warp factor against speed, and an explanation that integer warp factors are more efficient than fractional ones), the transporter (which is said to transport matter from place to place keeping it in the form of a "matter stream", and works using analog technology to defeat pattern storage requirements), the replicator (which is said to work on the basis of the transporter, but with a less precise digital resolution), holodecks, phasers and photon torpedoes, impulse drive, the warp core (including a chemical formula for dilithium), subspace radio, saucer separation and landing, the computer, and the various auxiliary craft of the Enterprise. It also contains a section regarding the history of the development of the Galaxy-class ships.

== In-jokes ==
In addition to the more serious material, the manual also contains a number of inside jokes. These include:

- A readable version of the medical display with the words "Medical Insurance Coverage Available" visible.
- A cross-section diagram of the ship with the silhouettes of a rubber ducky, sports car, DC-3 airplane, Nomad from ST:TOS, a rat, and a hamster wheel visible.
- A statement that the stellar navigation department of the Enterprise-D is staffed by an assortment of cetaceans (later backed up by published blueprints of the Enterprise drawn by Sternbach).
- A statement that the primary component of the holodeck emitters is "Keiyurium", after Kei and Yuri, the "lovely angels" from Dirty Pair, a Japanese anime and manga franchise.

== Related publications ==
The print version was later complemented by a similar electronic version, the Star Trek: The Next Generation Interactive Technical Manual.

A follow-up title, the Star Trek: Deep Space Nine Technical Manual, was published in 1998.

== See also ==
- Star Trek: The Next Generation Technical Manual at Memory Alpha
- List of Star Trek Technical Manuals
