= Santa Claus machine =

Hypothetical manufacturing machine

A Santa Claus machine is a hypothetical machine that is capable of creating any required object or structure out of any given material.

== Origin ==
The term was coined by Theodore Taylor in 1978:

It's possible to imagine a machine that could scoop up material – rocks from the Moon or rocks from asteroids – process them inside and produce just about any product: washing machines or teacups or automobiles or starships. Once such a machine exists it could gather sunlight and materials that it's sitting on, and produce on call whatever product anybody wants to name, as long as somebody knows how to make it and those instructions can be given to the machine.

== See also ==
- 3D printing
- Molecular assembler
- Replicator (Star Trek)
- Fusion torch
