= Star Trek: The Next Generation Interactive Technical Manual =

Star Trek: The Next Generation Interactive Technical Manual is a multimedia application software program published by Simon and Schuster Interactive in 1994. Based on the then-recently ended TV series Star Trek: The Next Generation, it allows users to explore a computer-generated simulation of the spacecraft USS Enterprise NCC-1701-D, the principal setting of the series. The software uses Apple Computer's QuickTime VR, a technology which enables users to view every side of 3D rendered objects, and includes a virtual tour given by Jonathan Frakes (in his role as William Riker from the TV series). The Interactive Technical Manual was billed as the first CD-ROM title built with QuickTime VR.

== History ==
The software was created by Keith Halper, Mike Okuda, Rick Sternbach, John Knoll; Eric Zarakov and the Apple Advanced Technology Group; Peter Mackey and the Imergy Software Development Team. Technical writers, set designers, and film production crews from the Star Trek: The Next Generation TV series assisted in the production. Halper said at the time that QuickTime VR enabled the team to "create immersive experiences" impossible otherwise.

A port of the program was announced for the Apple Bandai Pippin and was one of the console's most high-profile titles, but was ultimately never released.

== Reception ==
AllGame gave a rating of four out of five, calling it an excellent example of QuickTime VR. Reviewing a 1999 re-release, they called it a classic program and said it's perfect for those who want to know everything about the TNG series Enterprise.

The CD-ROM was one of three finalists for PC Magazine's 12th Annual Awards for Technical Excellence, as it was the first implementation of Apple's QuickTime VR technology. It was a commercial hit, with global sales in excess of 400,000 units by 1996.
