= Realm of Fear =

- Star Trek: The Next Generation episode
- Episode no.: Season 6 Episode 2
- Directed by: Cliff Bole
- Written by: Brannon Braga
- Production code: 228
- Original air date: September 28, 1992

Guest appearances
- Colm Meaney - Miles O'Brien; Patti Yasutake - Alyssa Ogawa; Dwight Schultz - Reginald Barclay; Renata Scott - Hayes; Thomas Belgrey - Yosemite Crewmember; Majel Barrett - Computer Voice

Episode chronology
← Previous "Time's Arrow, Part II"	Next → "Man of the People"
- Star Trek: The Next Generation season 6

"Realm of Fear" is the 128th episode of the American science fiction television series Star Trek: The Next Generation. It is the second episode of the sixth season.

Set in the 24th century, the series follows the adventures of the Starfleet crew of the Federation starship Enterprise-D. In this episode, Lieutenant Reginald Barclay (played by Dwight Schultz) has a paralyzing fear of the transporter and is convinced he is being attacked by a creature inside the beam.

The mission involves the Enterprise's encounter with the USS Yosemite, which is trapped in a plasma stream and whose crew is missing. This provides a backdrop to explore Barclay's fears, showing a new facet of a character who was previously oriented towards comic relief.

== Plot ==
The Enterprise comes to the assistance of the USS Yosemite, a science vessel from which several crewmen disappeared in a transporter accident. The Enterprise is unable to transport crew members directly to the Yosemite due to interference. Lt. Reginald Barclay suggests linking the transporter systems of both ships, which allows them to transport one by one to the Yosemite but requires a lengthy dematerialization/materialization process. Barclay, assigned as part of the team, hesitates to transport and instead walks away.

Barclay discusses the matter with Counselor Deanna Troi, who teaches him Betazoid meditation techniques to help calm himself. Transporter Chief Miles O'Brien provides Barclay with advice on dealing with his fears, relating his own fear of spiders. Barclay is safely transported to the Yosemite, where he helps the crew investigate. On his return trip, Barclay believes he sees wormlike creatures in the matter stream that attempt to approach him and touch his arm, but he materializes on the Enterprise without harm. He decides that he is suffering from transporter psychosis, a rare affliction. His paranoia forces Troi to declare him unfit for duty. Barclay asks O'Brien to review the transporter logs, and O'Brien agrees there was a strange surge during Barclay's transport. Barclay asks O'Brien to transport him again, recreating the surge, and Barclay again sees the creatures in the matter stream.

Barclay calls a meeting with the senior staff and explains his observations. Captain Picard orders a thorough review of the transport systems and those that have used it recently. Barclay's arm is found to be out of phase, and further examination reveals microbes that were not detected by the biofilter. To remove the microbes, Barclay is put through the transport again, holding him in the matter stream for a longer duration to allow the biofilters to work. While in the stream, Barclay sees one of the creatures approach him and at the last moment reaches out to grab it to his body. When he materializes one of the missing Yosemite crew materializes alongside him. Barclay realizes that the remaining worm creatures in the matter stream are the missing crew members, who are then quickly rescued. The Enterprise crew determined that an explosion near the Yosemite during the transport caused the people to become trapped. Later, Barclay and O'Brien meet at Ten-Forward to discuss the nature of fear, and O'Brien shows a visibly frightened Barclay his pet spider Christina.

== Influences ==
This episode focused on exploring the fictional transporter technology of Star Trek, and technological phobias similar to the original series character Doctor McCoy who also tried to avoid using it when possible. Transporter accident episodes are a recurring plot device across the Star Trek universe. Writer Brannon Braga commented that the episode was inspired by his own fear of flying: “Certainly it was one of my most personal episodes. People around here say I’m Barclay. I hate flying and that’s where the idea came from. If I lived in the 24th Century, I’d be afraid to transport so I enjoyed exploring some of the deeper neuroses that Barclay had.”

== Releases ==
The episode was released as part of the Star Trek: The Next Generation season six DVD box set in the United States on December 3, 2002. A remastered HD version was released on Blu-ray optical disc, on June 24, 2014. The most recent release was the first on Blu-ray disc, which took place on June 24, 2014.
