= Rick Sternbach =

American illustrator (born 1951)

- Born: Richard Michael Sternbach; July 6, 1951 (age 75); Bridgeport, Connecticut
- Education: University of Connecticut
- Known for: Star Trek, Cosmos: A Personal Voyage
- Awards: Hugo Award for Best Professional Artist 1977; Hugo Award for Best Professional Artist 1978; Emmy Award for Outstanding Individual Achievement in a Creative Technical Craft 1981

Richard Michael Sternbach (born July 6, 1951) is an illustrator who is best known for his space illustrations and his work on the Star Trek television series.

== Early years ==
Born July 6, 1951, in Bridgeport, Connecticut, in 1969 Sternbach enrolled at the University of Connecticut with an art major, but after a couple of years switched to marine biology. After leaving University, he became an illustrator for books and magazines, with his first cover illustration published on the October 1973 issue of Analog magazine. Sternbach became a friend of science fiction writer Greg Bear, after his illustration of "A Martian Ricorso" featured in the cover of the February 1976 issue of Analog.

During 1974 to 1976 he produced several original works of art for the Gengras Planetarium, part of the Children's Museum of West Hartford, in Connecticut. The works included airbrush paintings of the Earth as a primeval planet. It is unknown if these works are still in possession of CMWH, the original owner and client of Sternbach.

In 1976 he helped found the Association of Science Fiction and Fantasy Artists (ASFA), to give legal advice to science fiction and fantasy artists on contracts and copyrights.

In 1977, inspired by the story of artist Ralph McQuarrie's move from working in the aerospace industry to working for George Lucas on Star Wars, Sternbach moved to California to seek illustration work in the film and television industry.

== Movie work ==
After some work for Disney and PBS, in April 1978, Sternbach was offered an illustrator position on Star Trek: The Motion Picture. As a member of the art department, working alongside Mike Minor, Sternbach designed control panel layouts and signage for the starship sets. He also helped to create the animated asteroid wormhole sequence and helped source material from NASA/JPL that was used in the design of V'ger.

From 1977 to 1980, Sternbach worked as an Assistant Art Director and Visual Effects Artist on Carl Sagan's Cosmos: A Personal Voyage series, where he designed sets and storyboard sequences during pre-production and then worked on visual effects scenes during production. For his work on the episode The Shores of the Cosmic Ocean he won the 1980-1981 Emmy Award for Outstanding Individual Achievement in a Creative Technical Craft.

At around the same time, Sternbach collaborated with Charley Kohlhase and Jim Blinn at JPL on the Voyager 1 Jupiter flyby movie, creating textures for the Galilean satellites.

With four other artists, in 1981 Sternbach helped found the non-profit International Association of Astronomical Artists (IAAA), to arrange projects that promote and foster space art.

In 1983, he worked as an illustrator on The Last Starfighter, story-boarding visual effects sequences and developing texture maps for computer rendered space scenes.

After Star Trek, as Scenic Artist on Steven Soderbergh's Solaris, Sternbach contributed control panel designs to the Prometheus station set and the Athena 7 ship cockpit and also designed and rendered animated loops to play on background set displays.

== Star Trek: The Next Generation and beyond ==
In January 1987, Sternbach was hired along with Andrew Probert (the first two art department hires) to start design work for a new Star Trek series, Star Trek: The Next Generation. Sternbach recounts that he heard the news about TNG on his car radio, and then quickly called Gene Roddenberry's office.

Sternbach helped define the look of the 24th century that would be used throughout The Next Generation and the series that followed it, Star Trek: Deep Space Nine and Star Trek: Voyager. Props such as the phasers, tricorders, PADDs and the communicator badge were all based on his designs.

During his time in the Star Trek art department at Paramount, Sternbach was also responsible for a number of starship designs including the Cardassian Galor class starships, the Klingon Vor'cha and Negh'Var class starships and Federation starships such as the Prometheus class, the Dauntless, the Nova class and the USS Voyager itself.

As fans of the original series of Star Trek and fans of the space program, Sternbach and Michael Okuda found roles as Technical Advisors on the series, advising the writers on technical matters and developing a number of concepts to add realism to the Star Trek universe, such as the Structural Integrity Field and the Inertial Dampener. To this end, they produced a technical manual for each series, that was made available along with the series bible to any prospective script-writers to familiarize them with the concepts behind the series' technology. In 1991, Pocket Books published an updated, illustrated version of the Next Generation Technical Manual and then seven years later, the Deep Space Nine Technical Manual.

When Voyager finished its seventh year in 2001, the producers decided they wanted a different look for the prequel series Star Trek: Enterprise that was set in the 22nd century, so Sternbach did not transfer over to the Enterprise art department, concluding his fourteen-year employment at Paramount Studios.

Sternbach returned to Star Trek in 2002, when he produced control panel designs and signage for the Enterprise-E and Romulan starships in Star Trek Nemesis.

As of 2015, he is also a member of the board of advisers for the Hollywood Science Fiction Museum.

== Space history ==
Sternbach is also a contributor to the usenet newsgroup sci.space.history, and is an accepted expert on the various paint schemes used on the Saturn V booster. His company, Space Model Systems, is a leading provider of accurate decals for model kits of the Saturn V, as well as the Apollo Command Module.

== Awards ==
- 1976 Locus Award for Best Professional Artist
- 1977 Hugo Award for Best Professional Artist
- 1977 Locus Award for Best Professional Artist
- 1978 Hugo Award for Best Professional Artist
- 1981 Emmy Award for Outstanding Individual Achievement in a Creative Technical Craft

== Books ==
- Goldstein, Stan; Goldstein, Fred; & Sternbach, Rick (1980). Star Trek Spaceflight Chronology. Pocket Books. ISBN 0-671-79089-7.
- Okuda, Michael; & Sternbach, Rick (1991). Star Trek: The Next Generation Technical Manual. Pocket Books. ISBN 0-671-70427-3.
- Sternbach, Rick (1996). U.S.S. Enterprise NCC-1701-D Blueprints. Pocket Books. ISBN 0-671-50093-7.
- Drexler, Doug; & Sternbach, Rick; & Zimmerman, Herman (1998). Star Trek: Deep Space Nine Technical Manual. Pocket Books. ISBN 0-671-01563-X.

== See also ==
- List of space artists
