= List of University of California, Berkeley alumni =

This page lists notable alumni and students of the University of California, Berkeley. Alumni who also served as faculty are listed in bold font, with degree and year.

Notable faculty members are in the article List of University of California, Berkeley faculty.

== Nobel Prize and Turing Award laureates ==
Alumni of the University of California, Berkeley

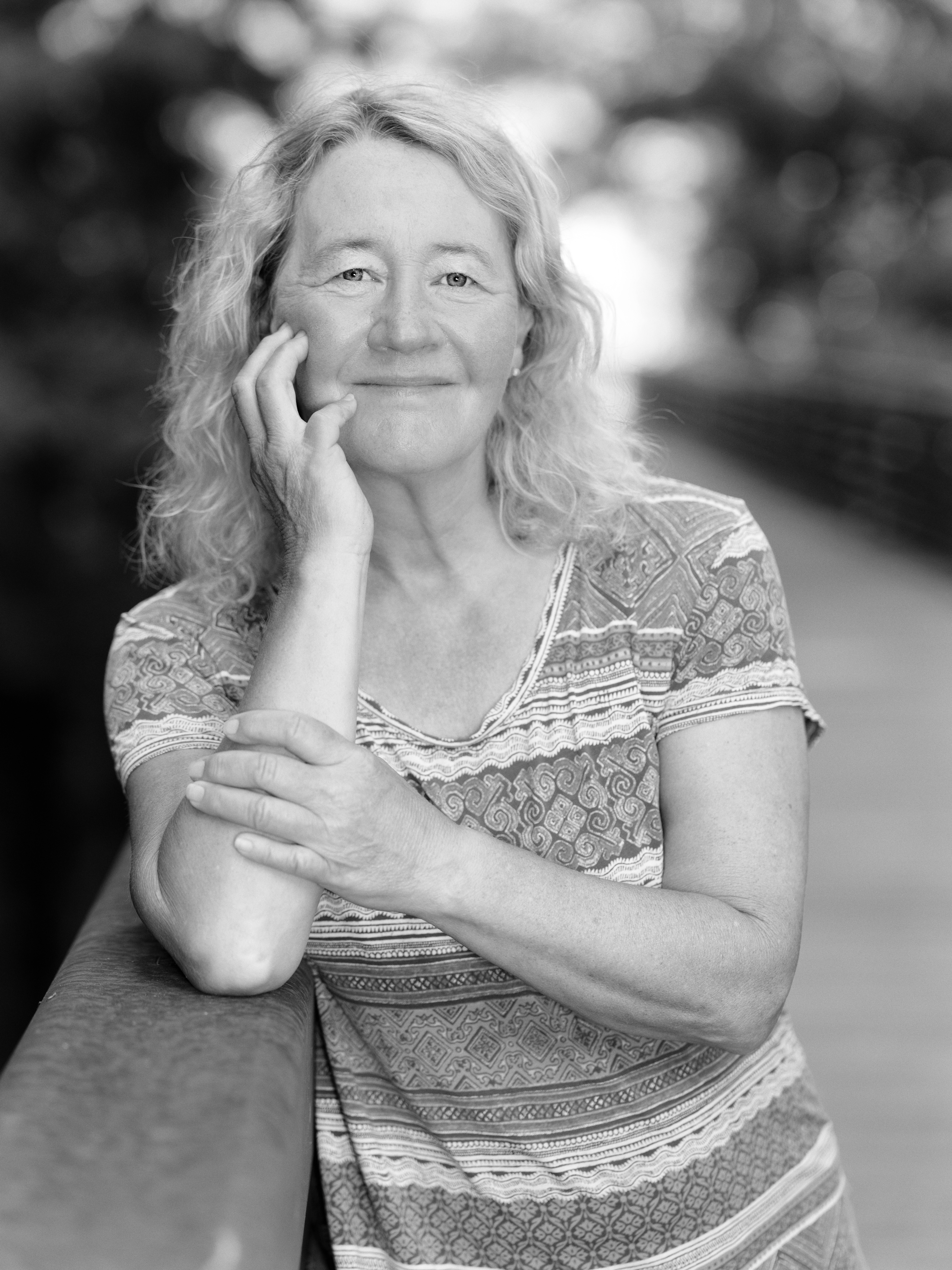
Carol Greider, PhD 1987, Nobel laureate (2009, Physiology or Medicine)

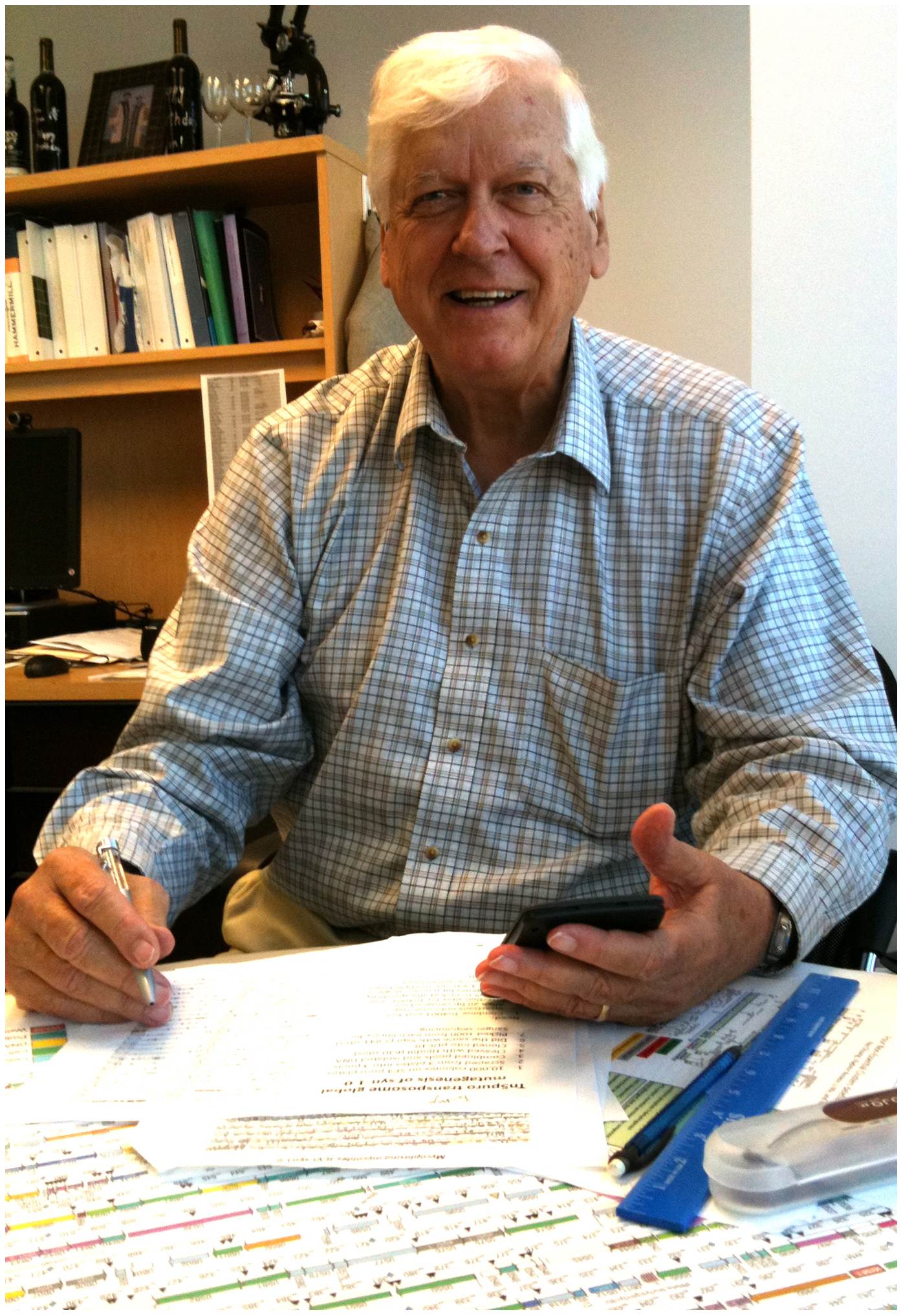
Hamilton O. Smith, BA 1952, Nobel laureate (1978, Physiology or Medicine)

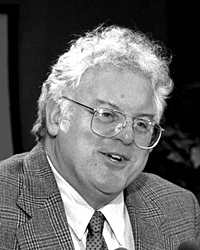
Robert Laughlin, BA 1972, Nobel laureate (1998, Physics)

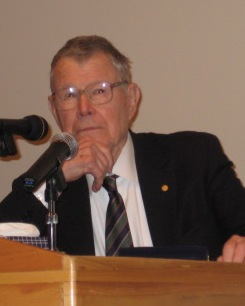
Thomas Schelling, BA 1944, Nobel laureate (2005, Economics)

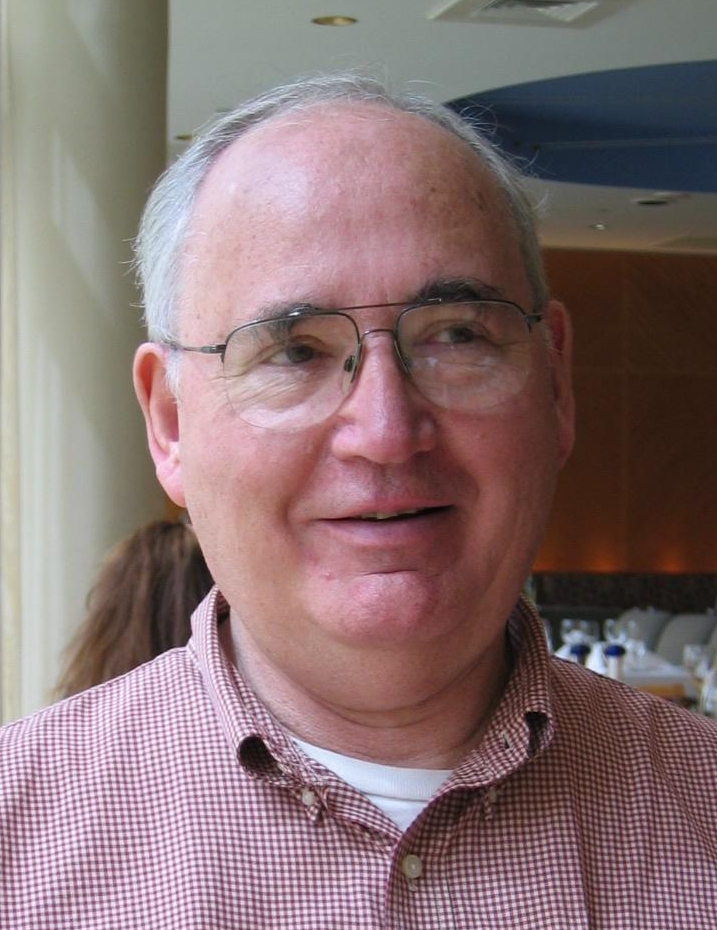
Dana Scott, BS 1954, Turing Award laureate (1976)

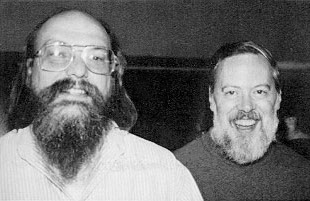
1983 Turing Award laureate Ken Thompson (left), BS 1965, MS 1966, with fellow laureate and colleague Dennis Ritchie (right); together, they created Unix

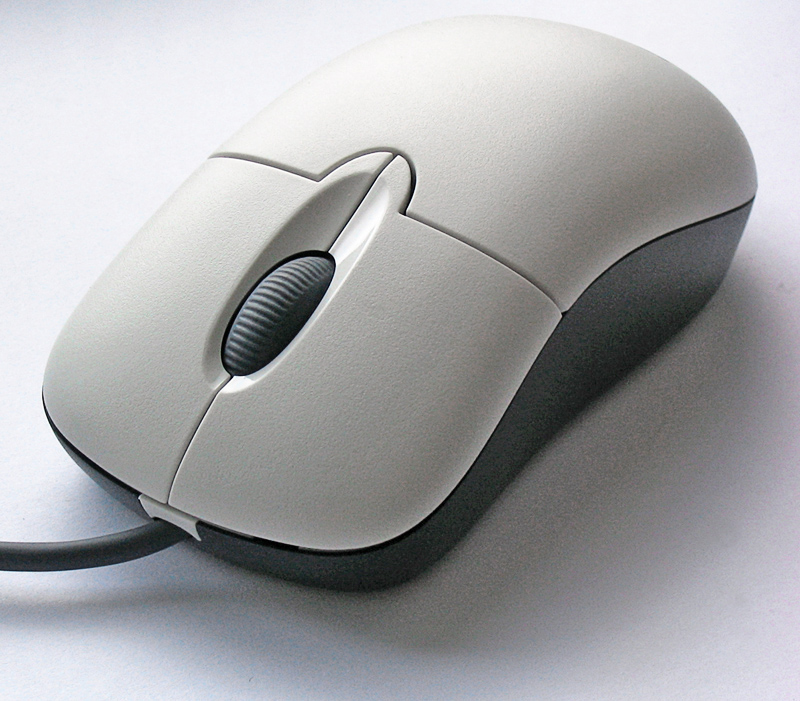
The computer mouse was invented by 1997 Turing Award laureate Doug Engelbart, B. Eng. 1952, Ph.D. 1955.

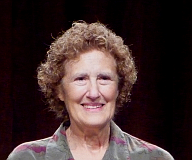
Barbara Liskov, BA Math 1961, Turing Award laureate (2008)

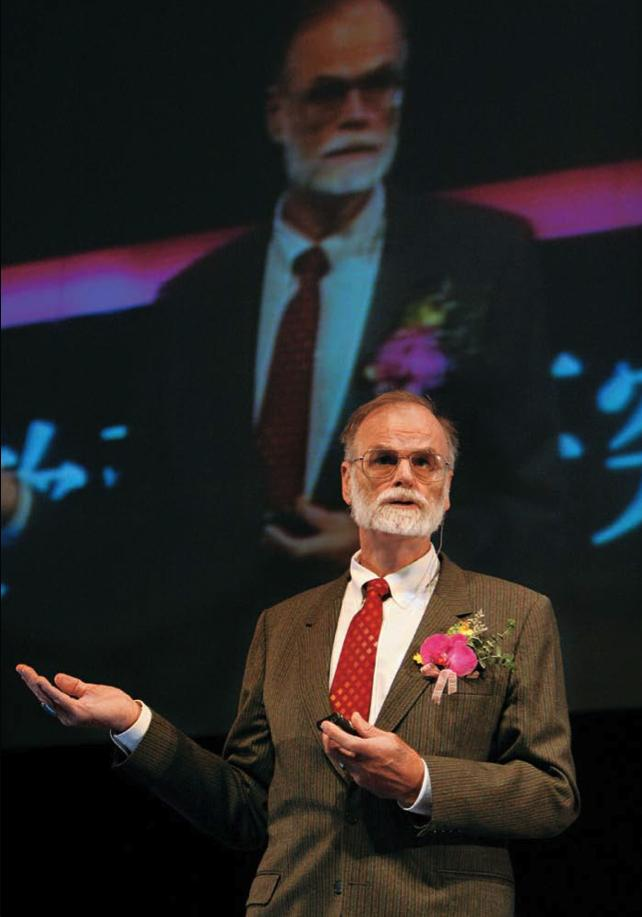
Jim Gray, B.S. 1966, Ph.D. 1969, Turing Award laureate (2001)

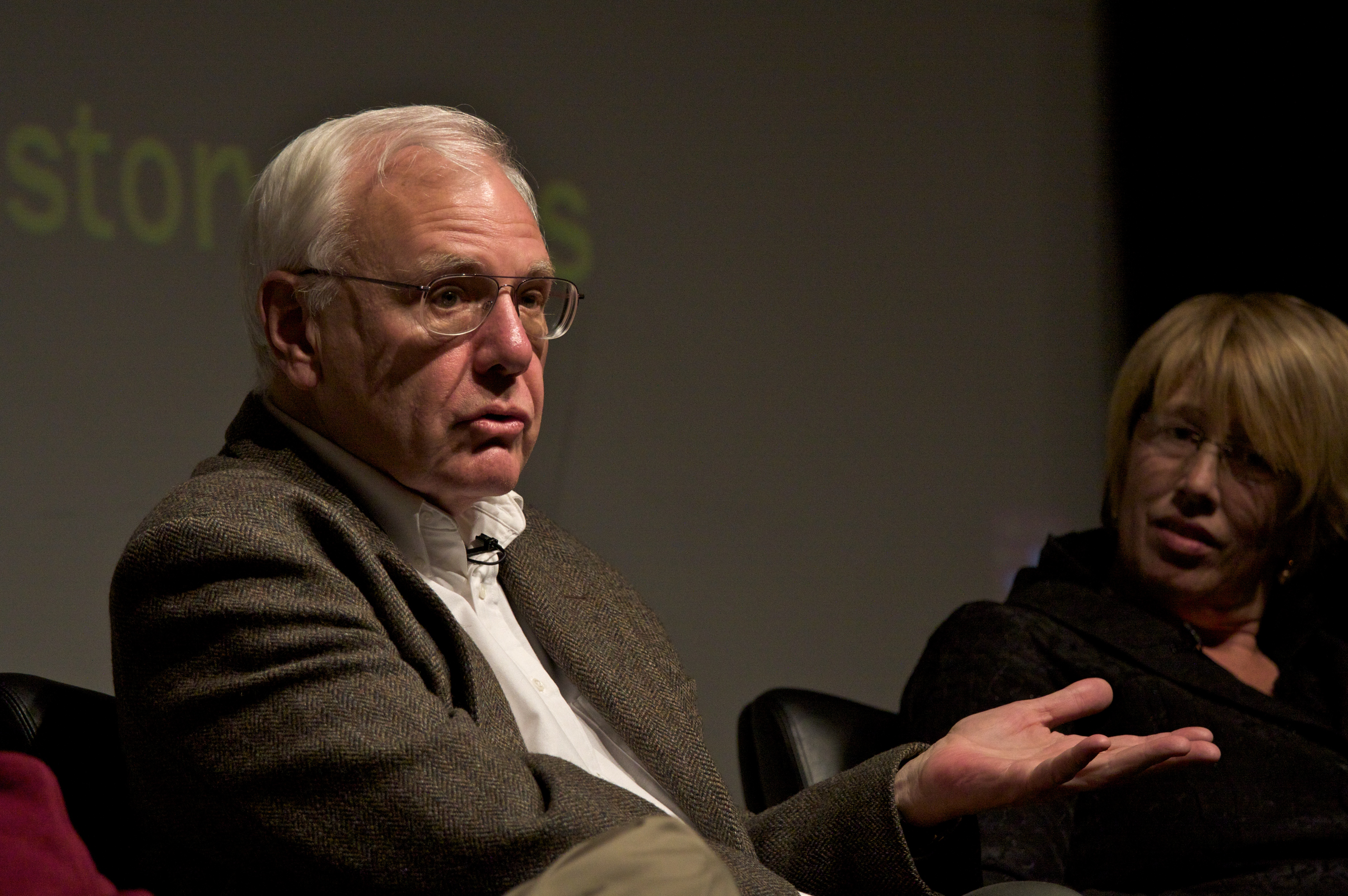
Charles P. Thacker, BA Physics 1967, Turing Award laureate (2009)

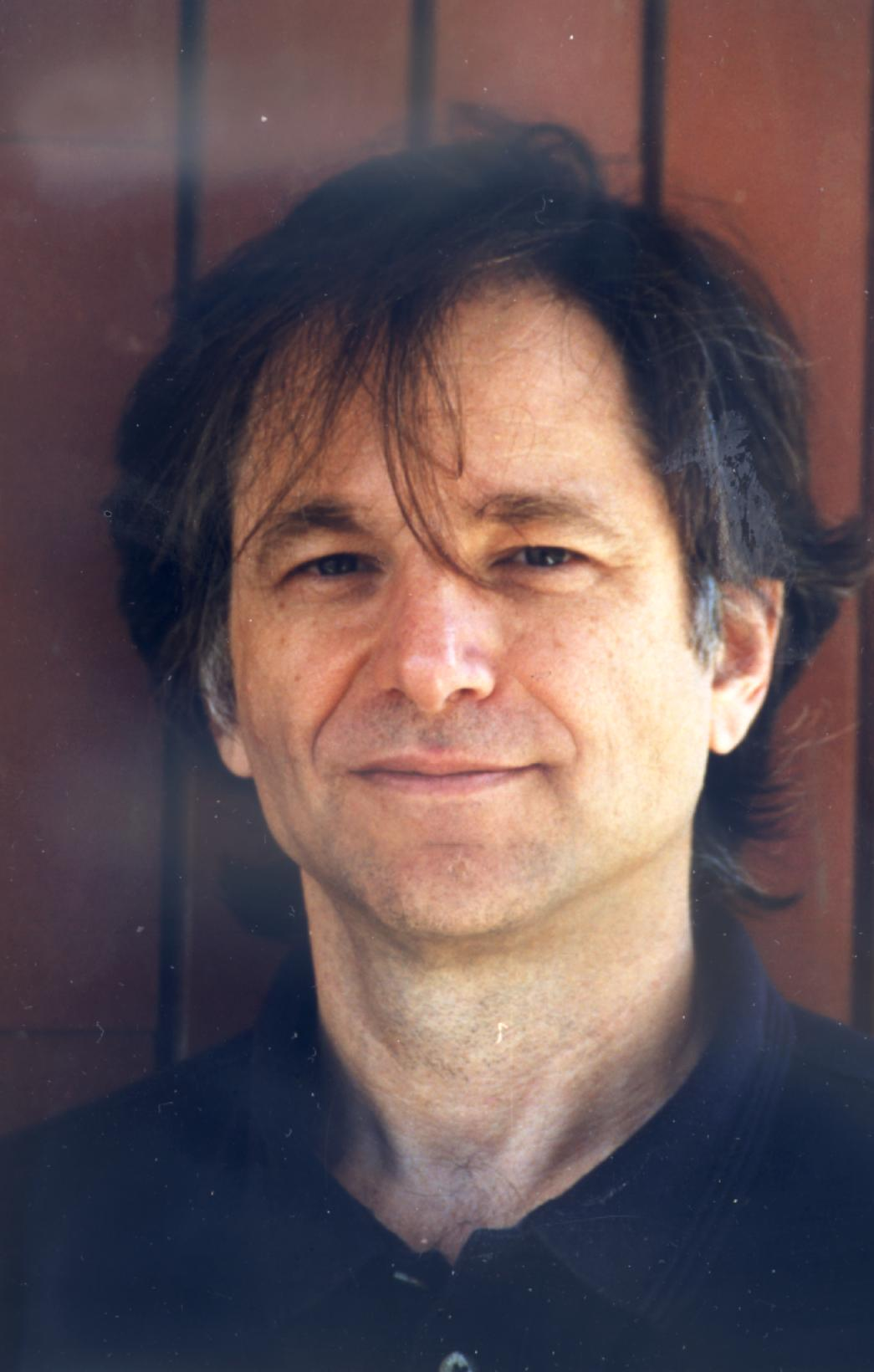
Leonard Adleman, BA Math 1969, PhD EECS 1976, Turing Award laureate (2002)

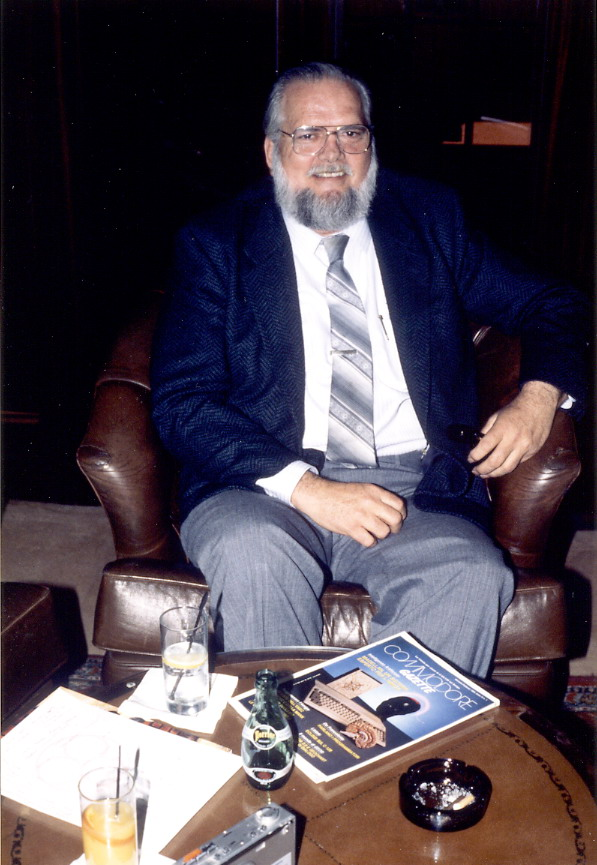
Jay Miner, BS 1959, "father of the Amiga" computer

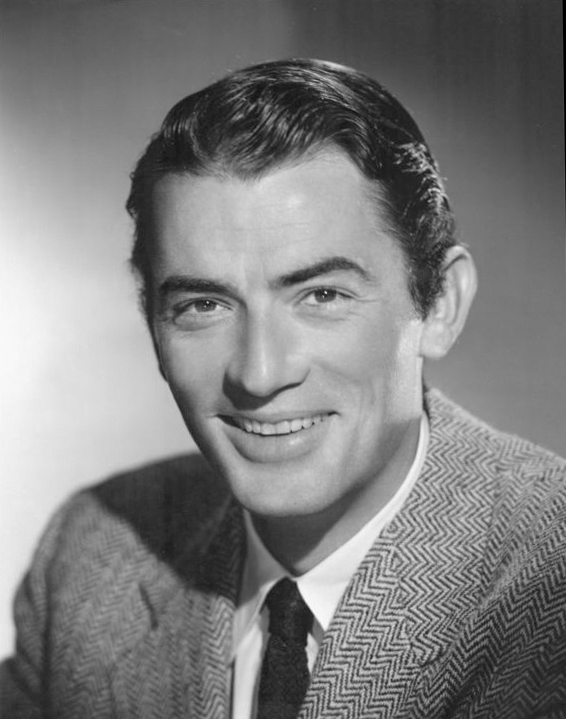
Academy Award-winning actor Gregory Peck, BA 1942

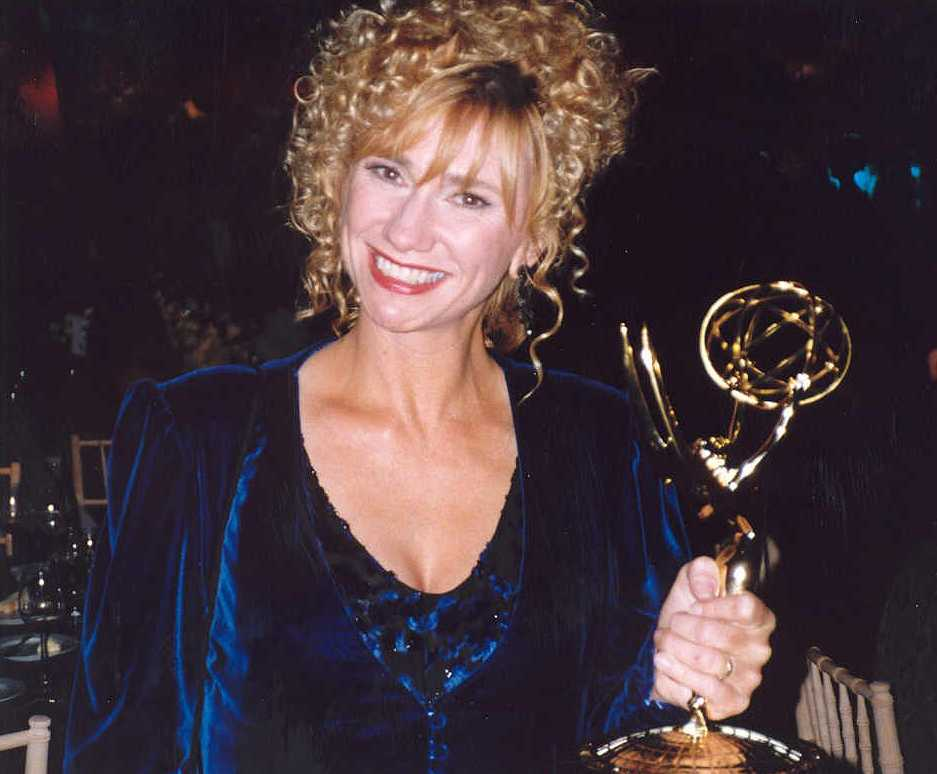
Emmy- and Golden Globe Award-winning actress Kathy Baker, BA 1977

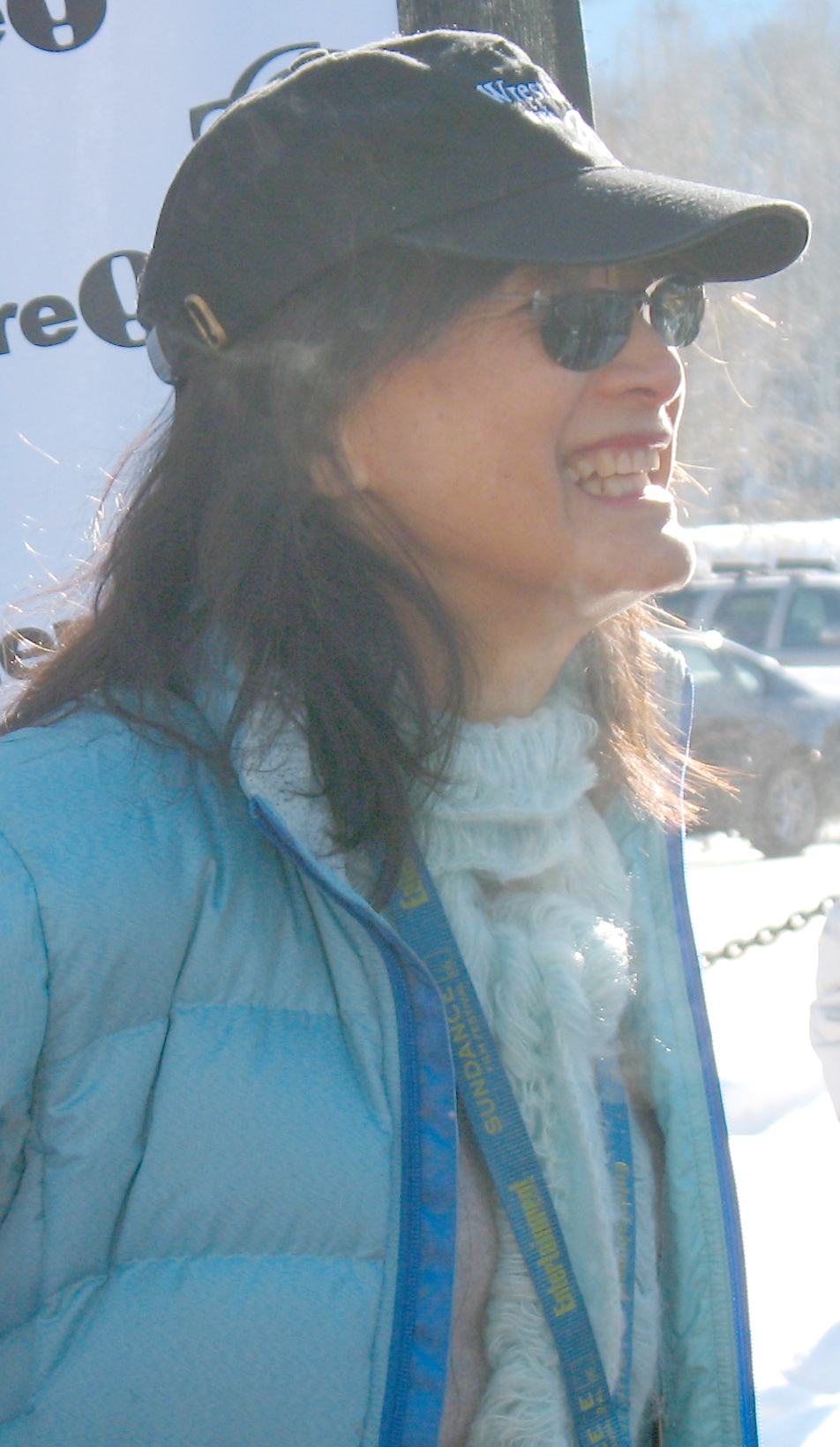
Academy Award-winning documentary director Freida Lee Mock, BA 1961

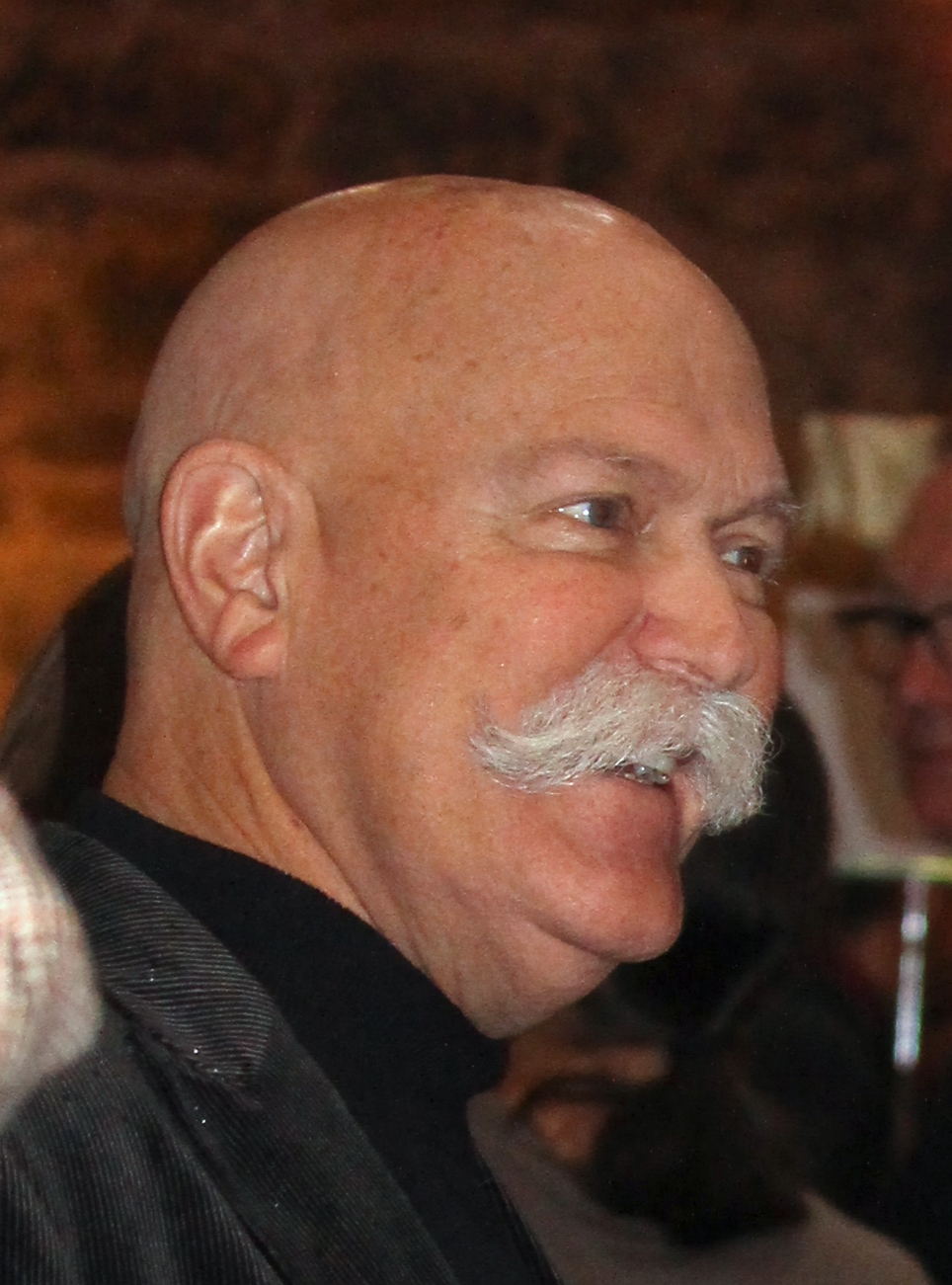
Will Vinton, B.A. 1970, Academy Award- and Emmy Award-winning pioneer of Claymation

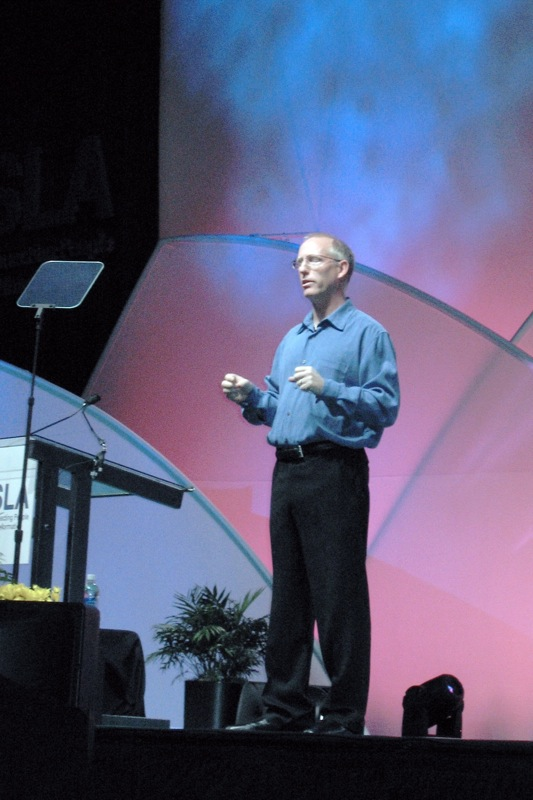
Scott Adams, MBA 1986, creator of the comic strip Dilbert

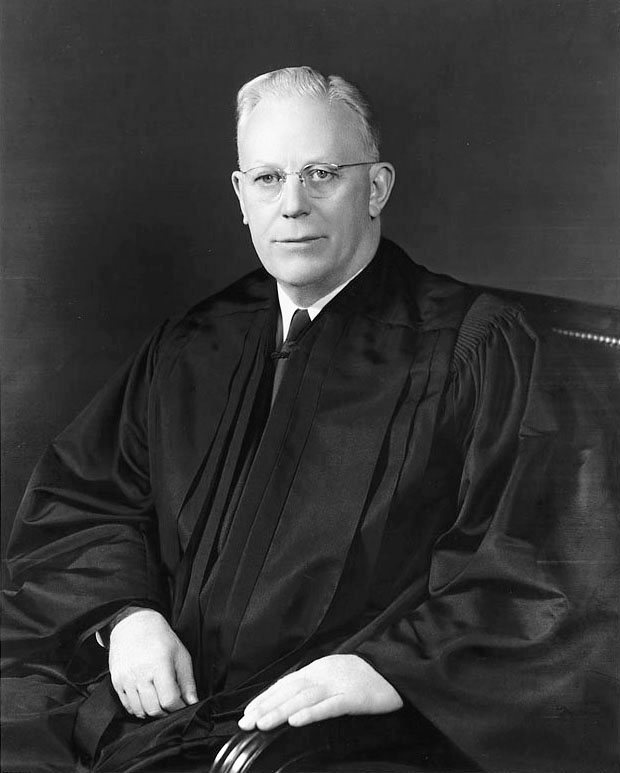
14th Chief Justice of the United States Earl Warren, BA 1912, LL.B. 1914

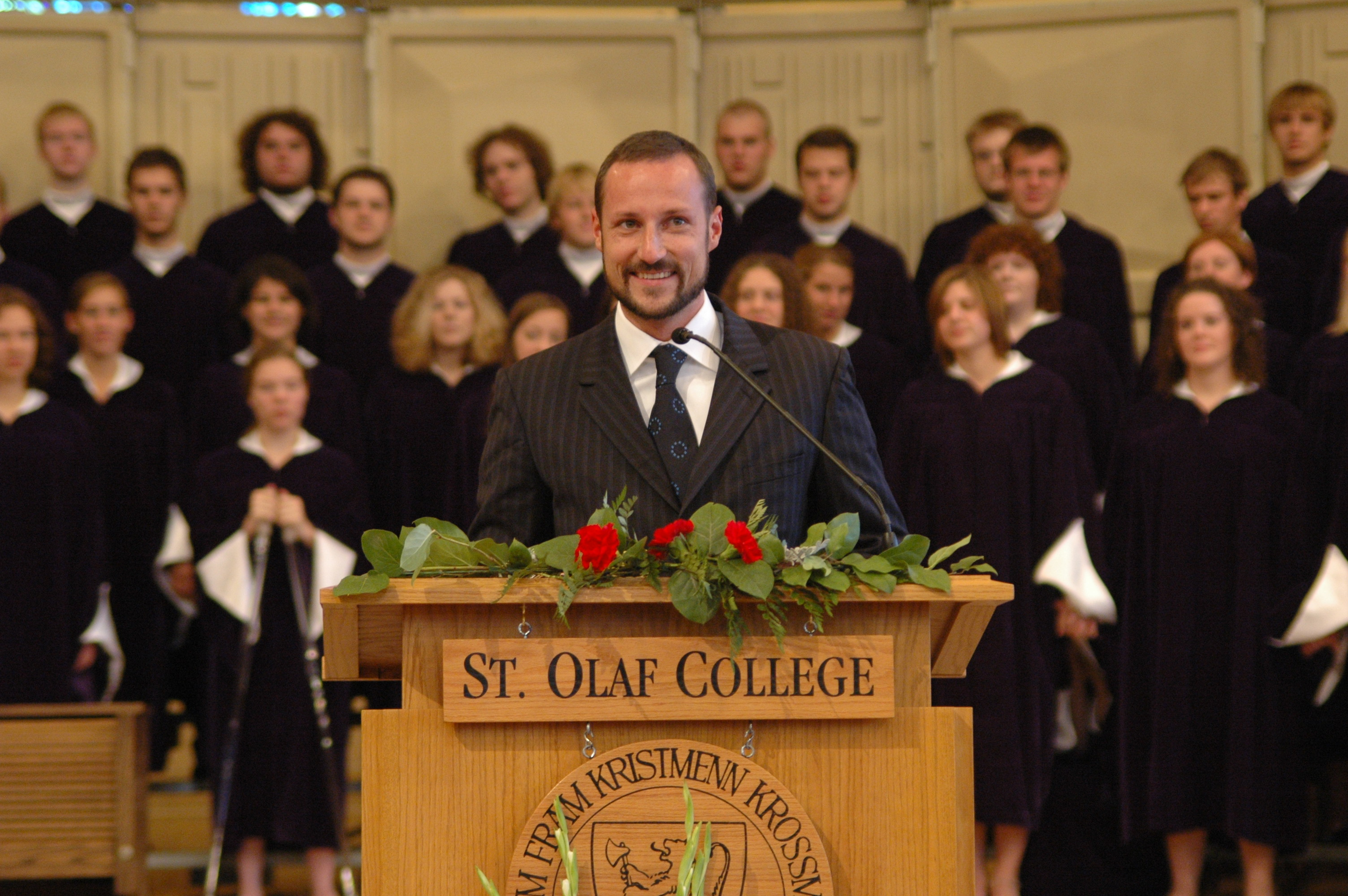
Haakon Magnus, Crown Prince of Norway, BA 1999

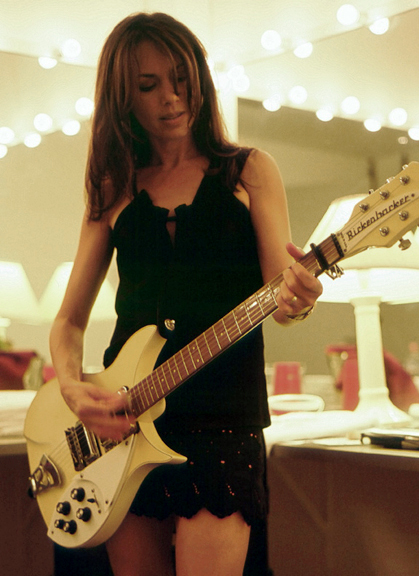
Singer Susanna Hoffs, BA 1980, of The Bangles

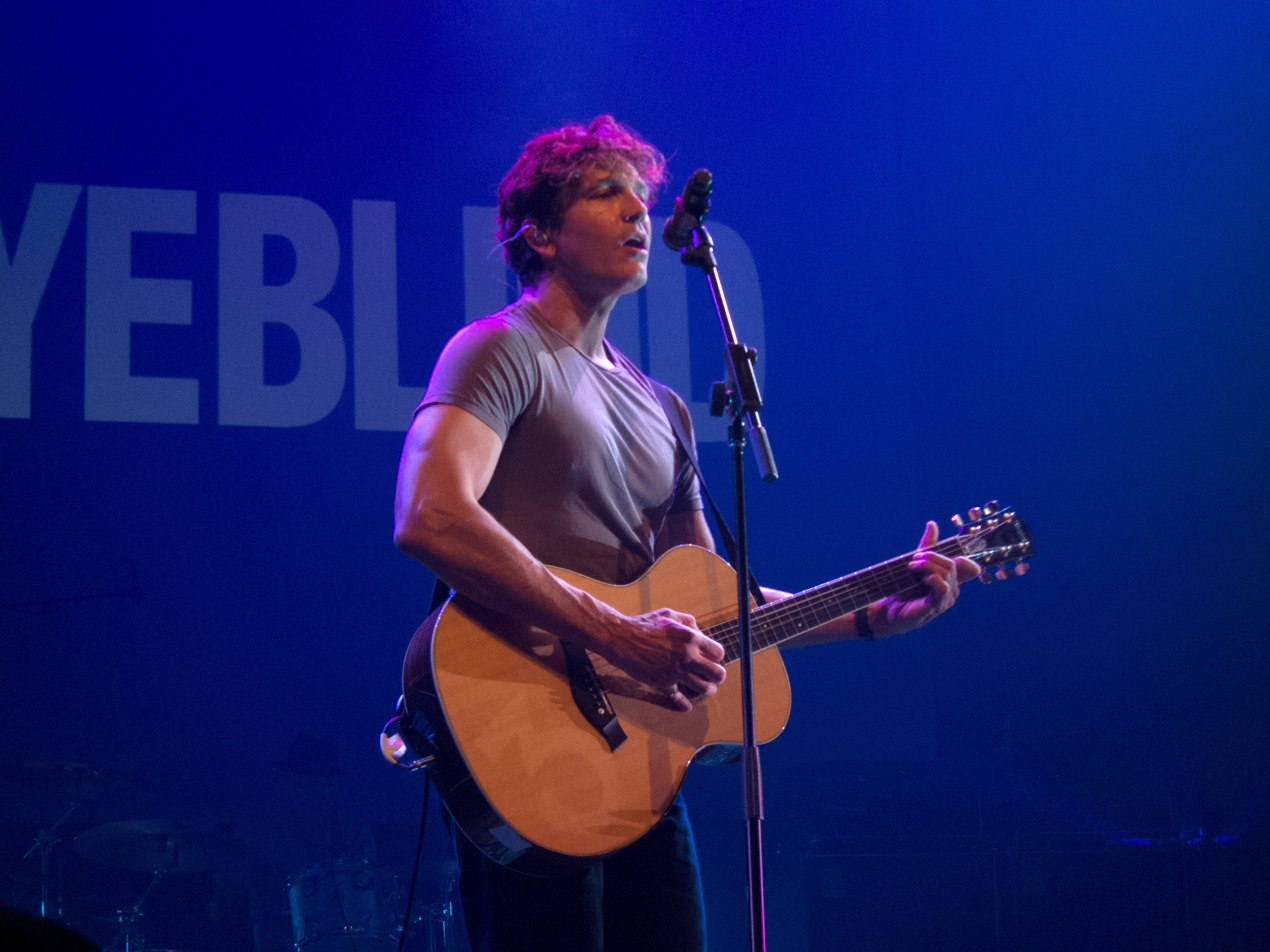
Stephan Jenkins, BA 1987, of Third Eye Blind

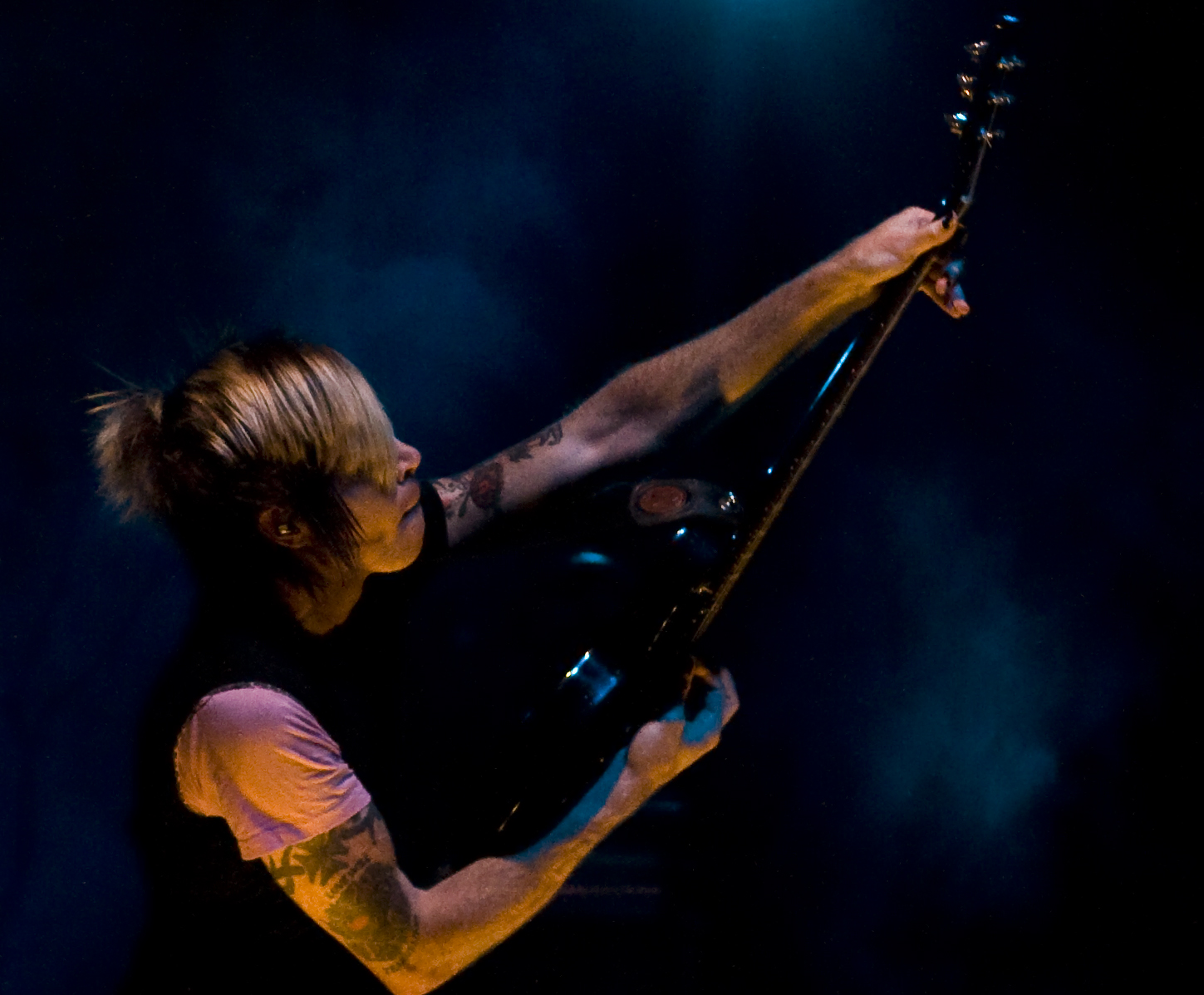
Guitarist Jade Puget, BA 1996, of AFI

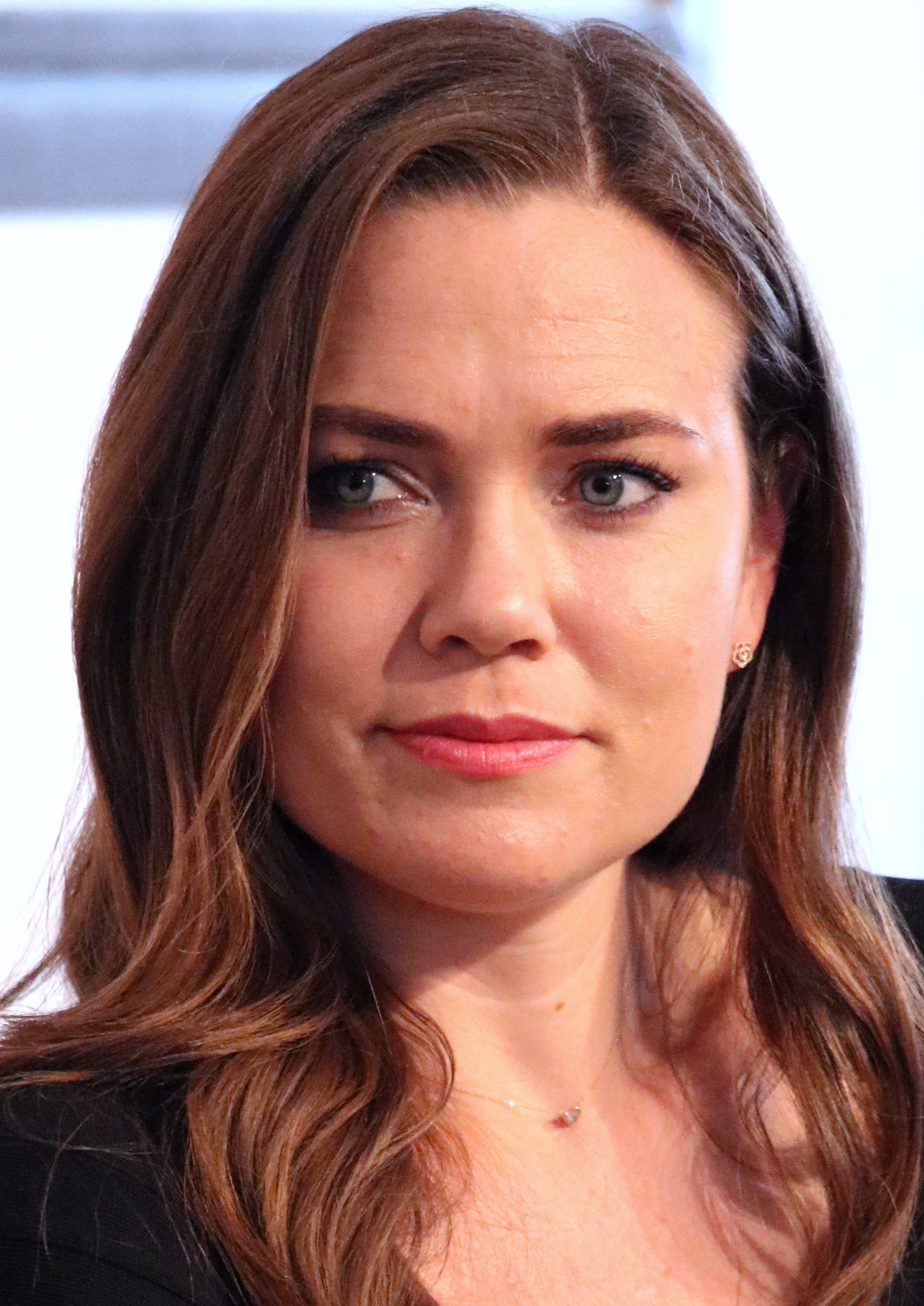
Natalie Coughlin, BA 2005, Olympic gold medalist; first American female athlete in modern Olympic history to win six medals in one Olympics

Jonny Moseley, BA 2007, Olympic gold medalist

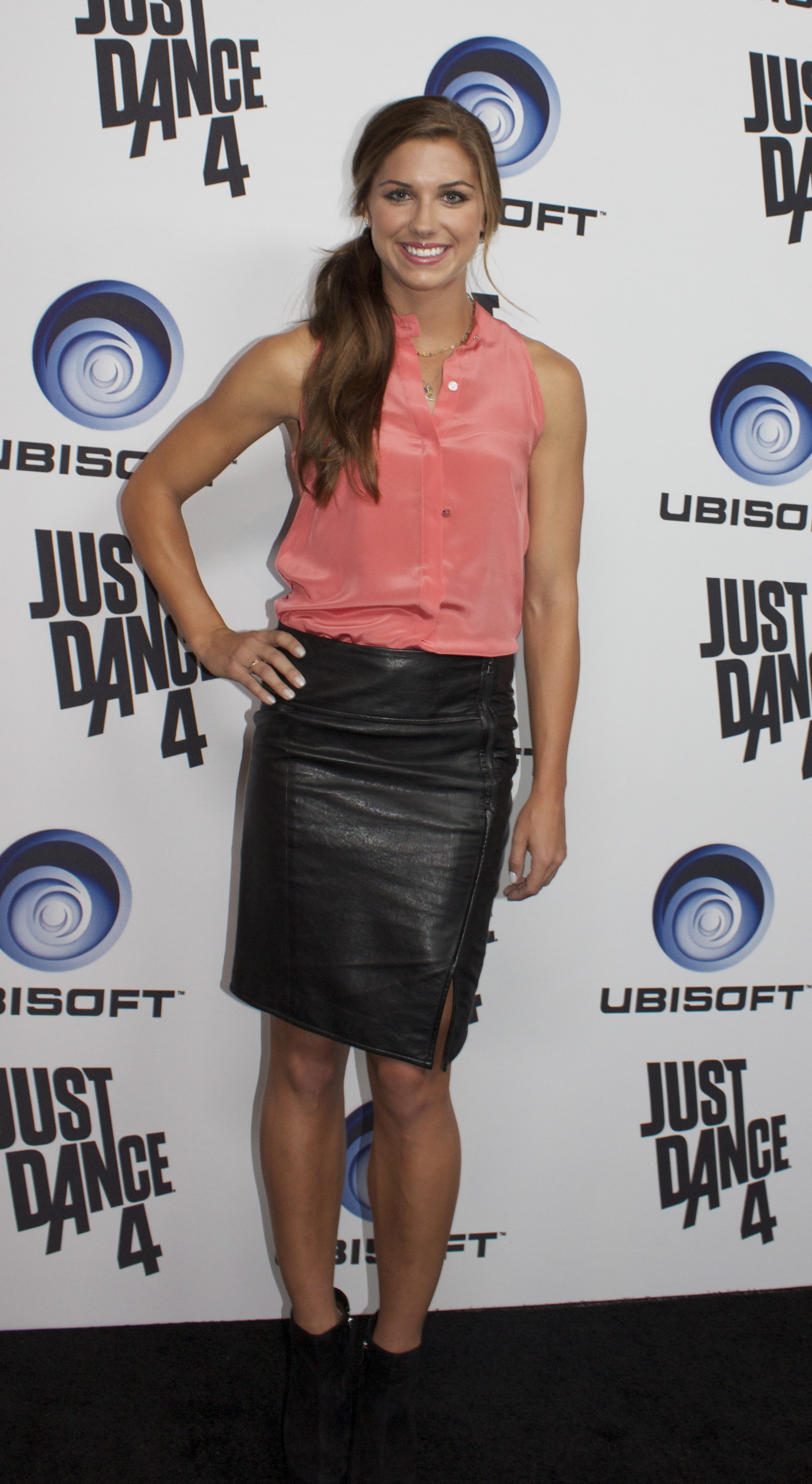
Alex Morgan, BA 2010, Olympic gold medalist

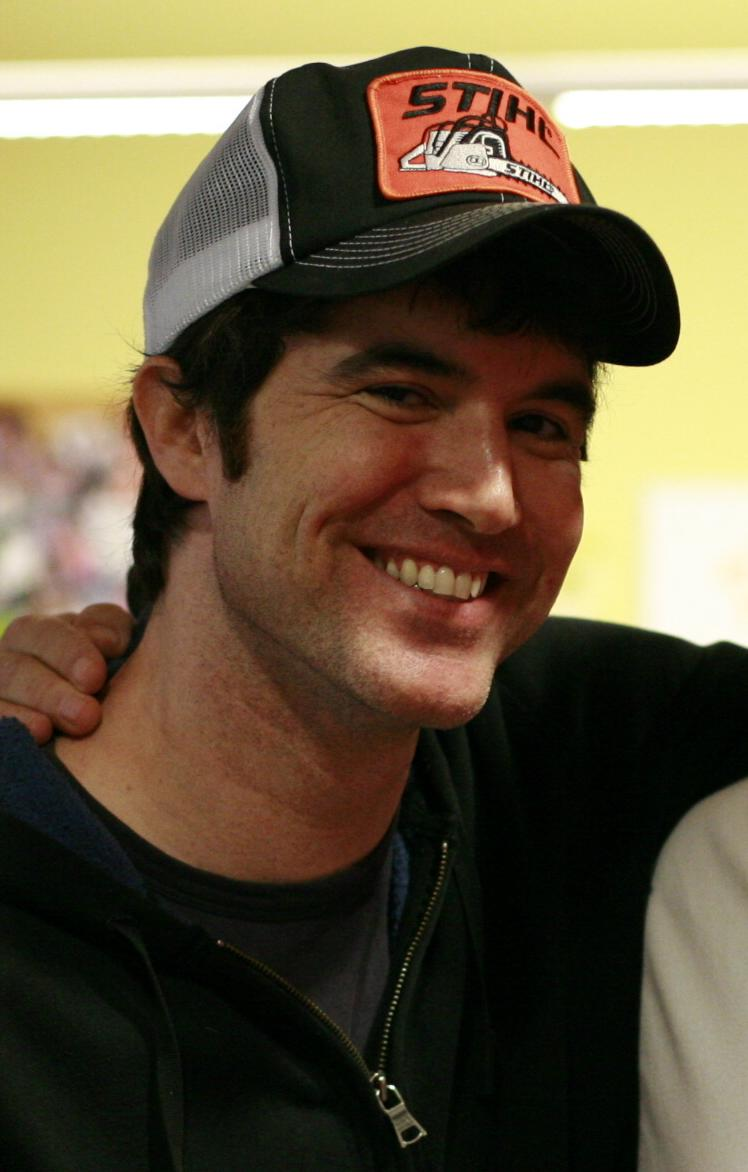
Tom Anderson, BA 1998, co-founder and president of MySpace

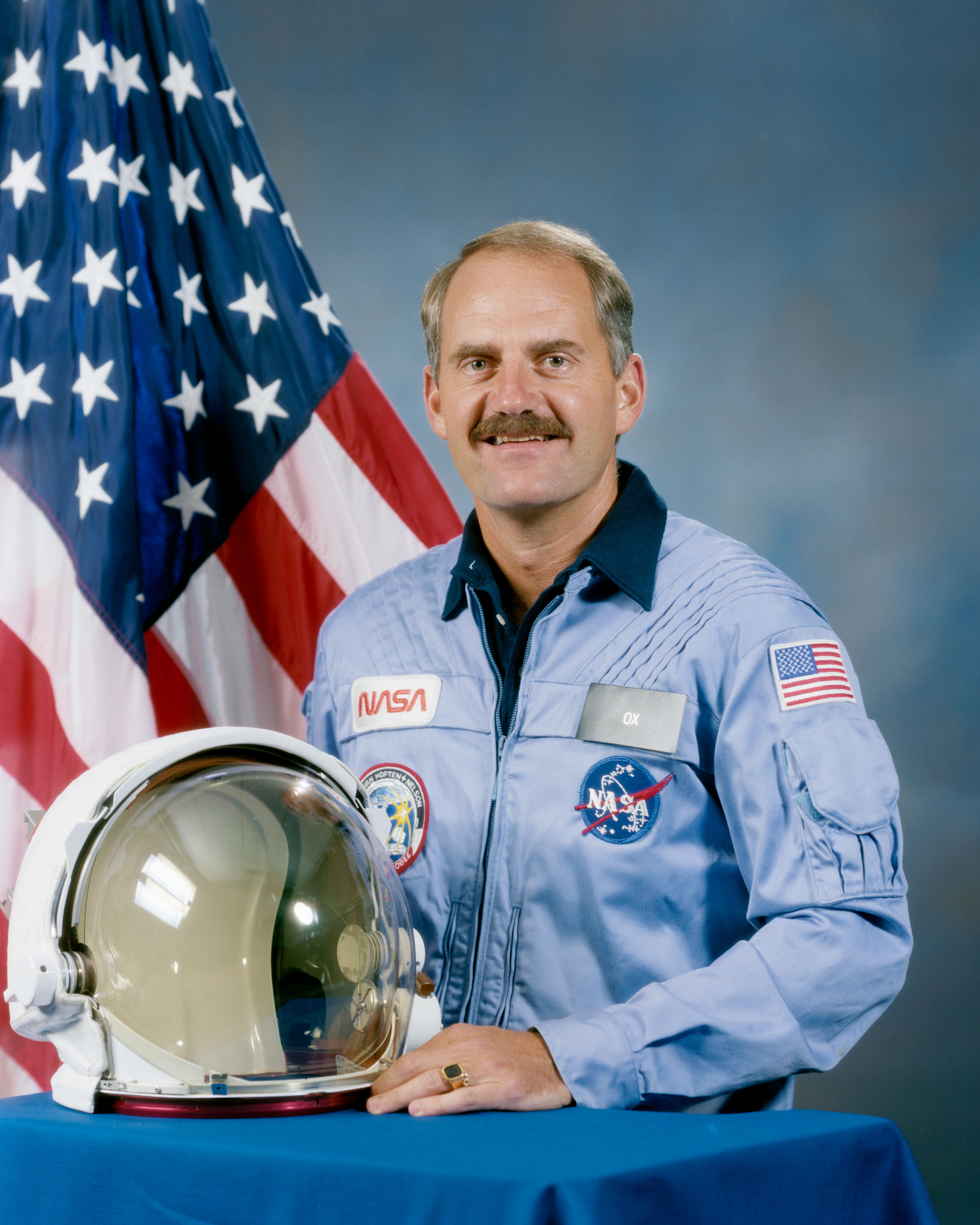
Astronaut James van Hoften, BS 1966

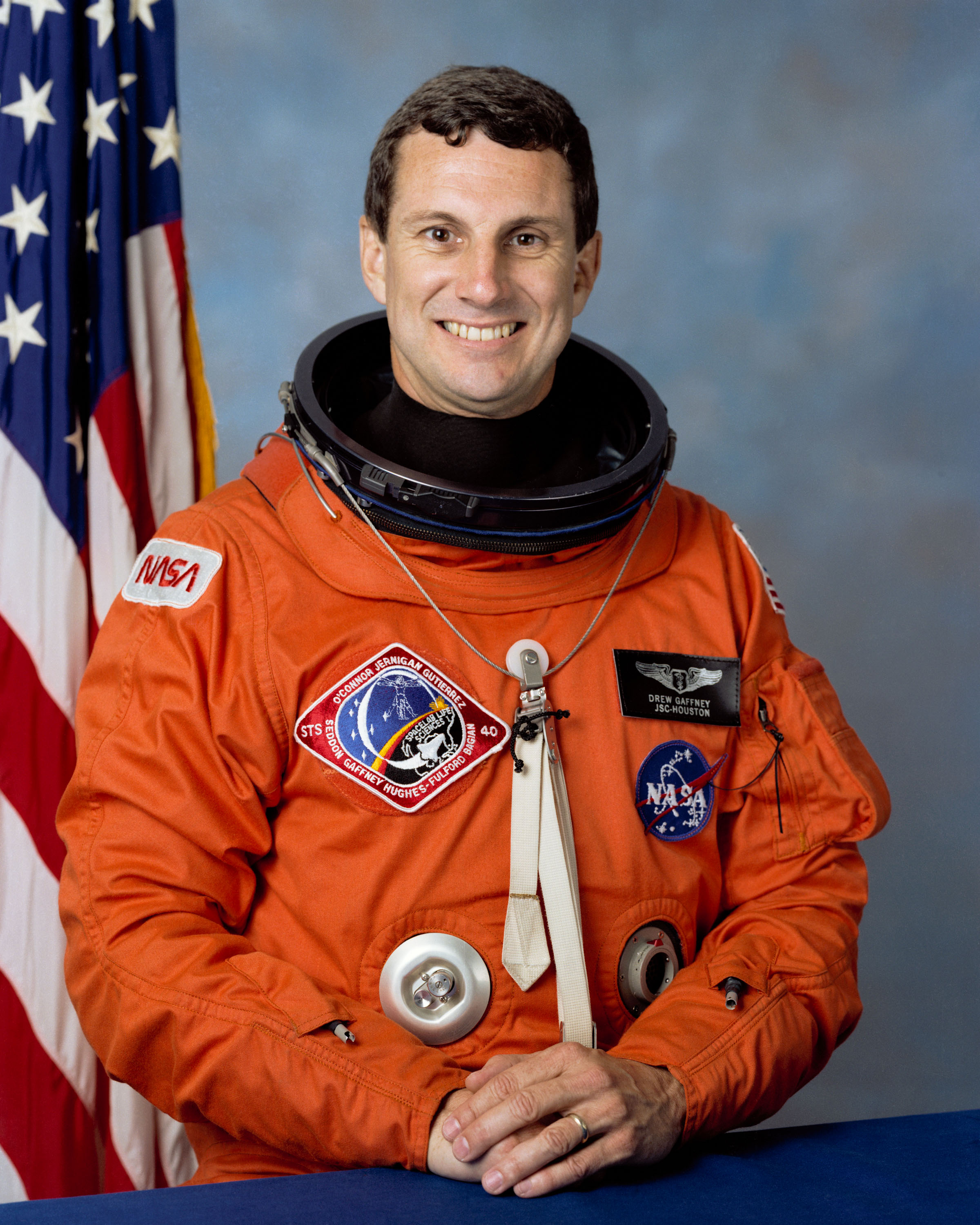
Astronaut F. Drew Gaffney, BA 1968

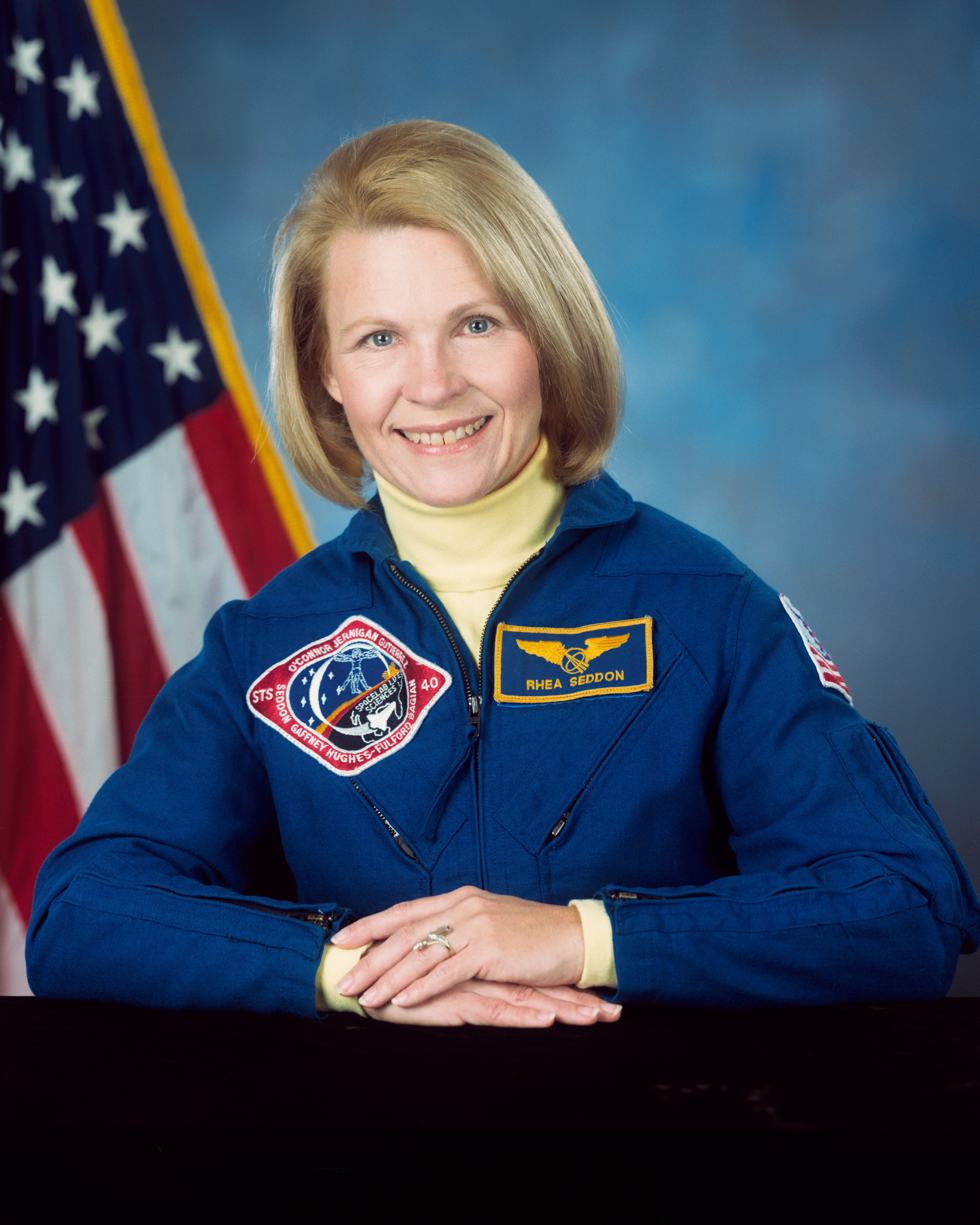
Astronaut Margaret Rhea Seddon, BS 1970

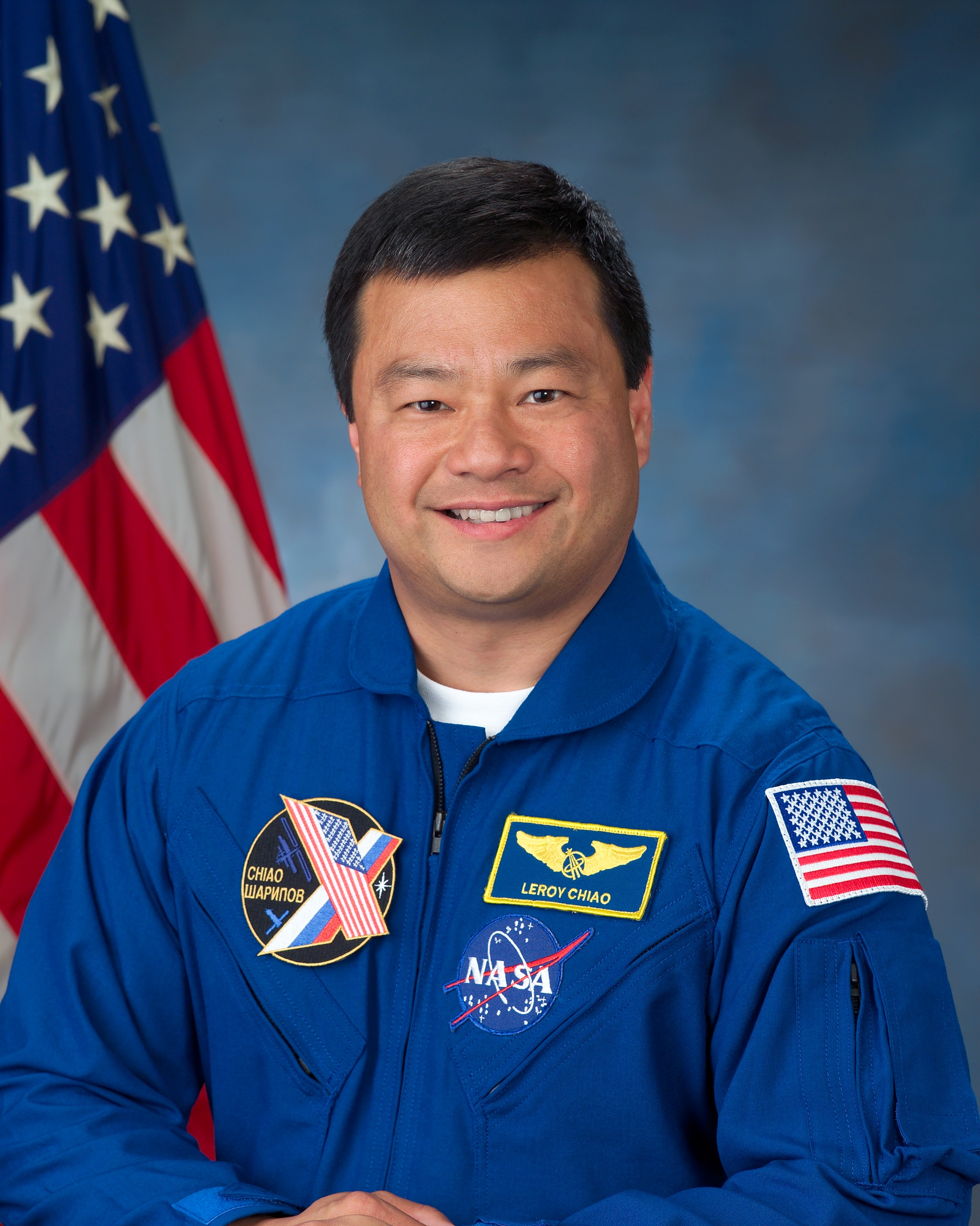
Astronaut Leroy Chiao, BS 1983, "first Asian-American and ethnic Chinese to perform a spacewalk"

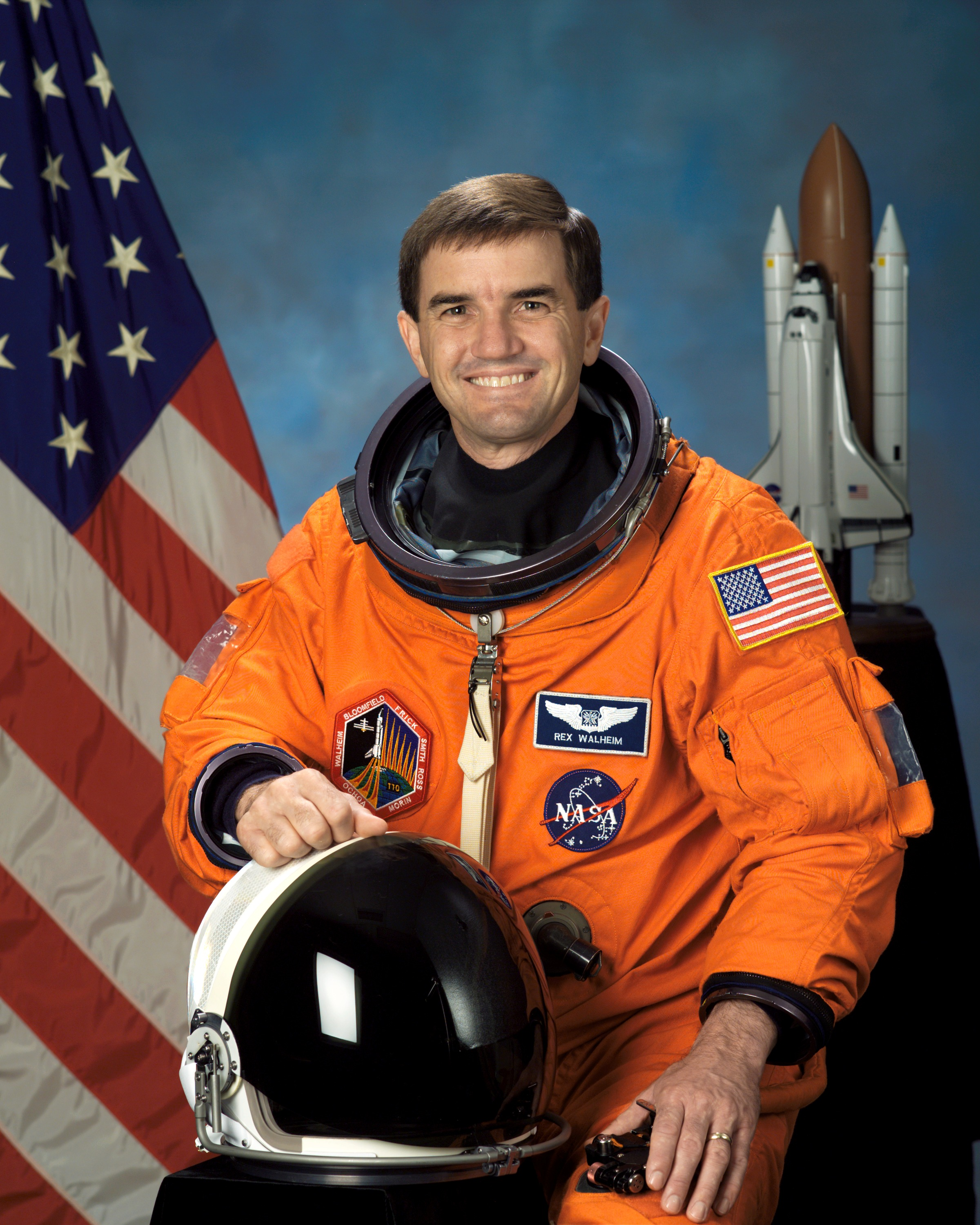
Astronaut Rex Walheim, BS 1984, member of the "Final Four" astronauts who flew on the very last Space Shuttle flight of STS-135

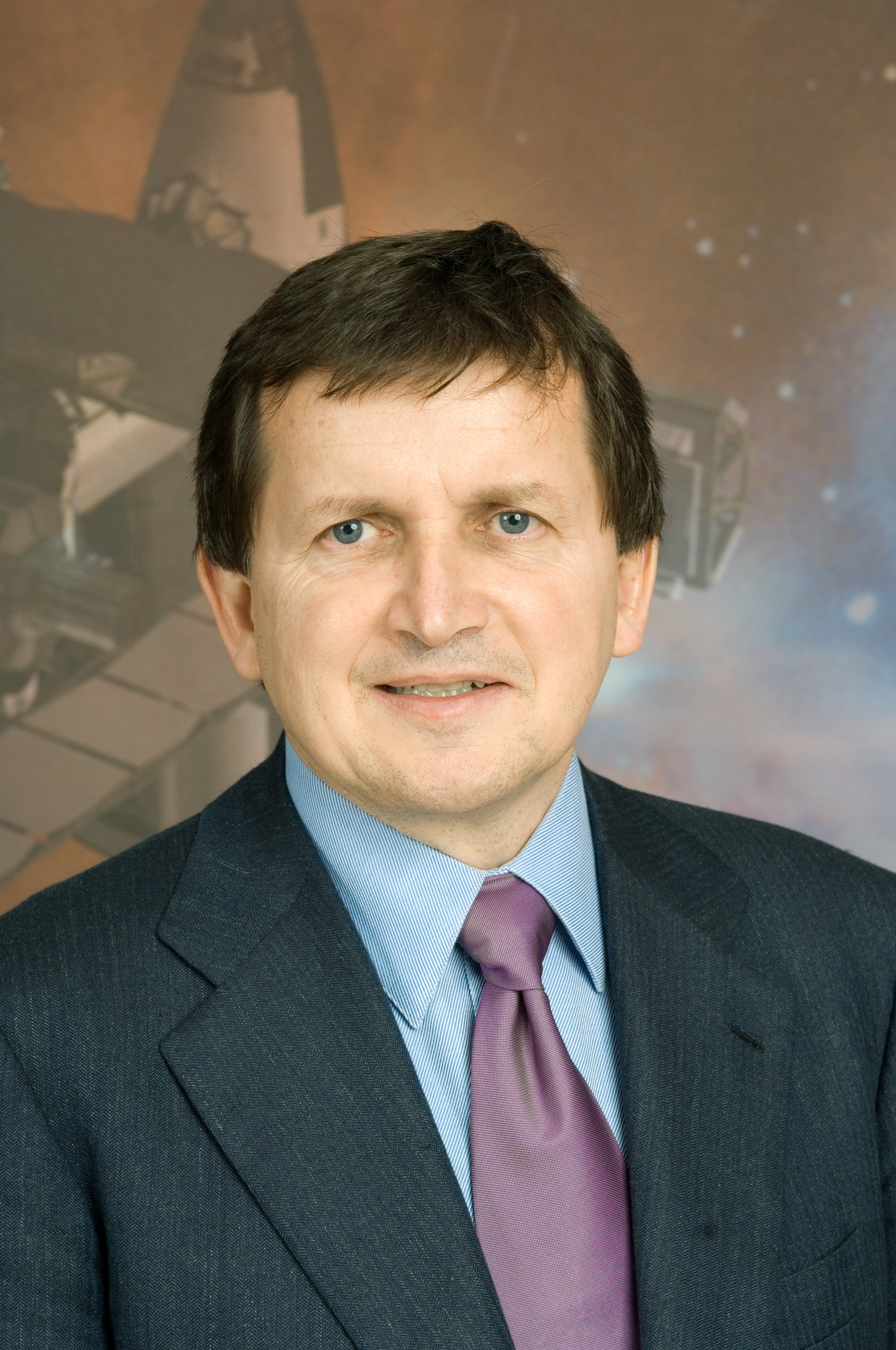
Microsoft billionaire Charles Simonyi, BS 1972, the first repeat space tourist

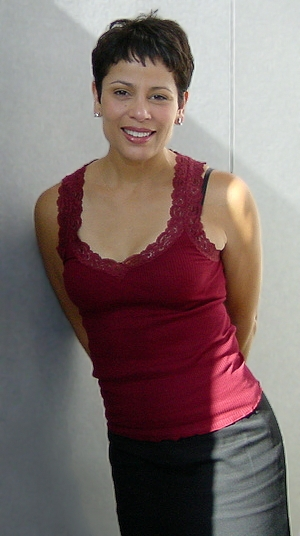
Roxann Dawson, BA 1980, actress (B'Elanna Torres on the television series Star Trek: Voyager), director, author, and playwright

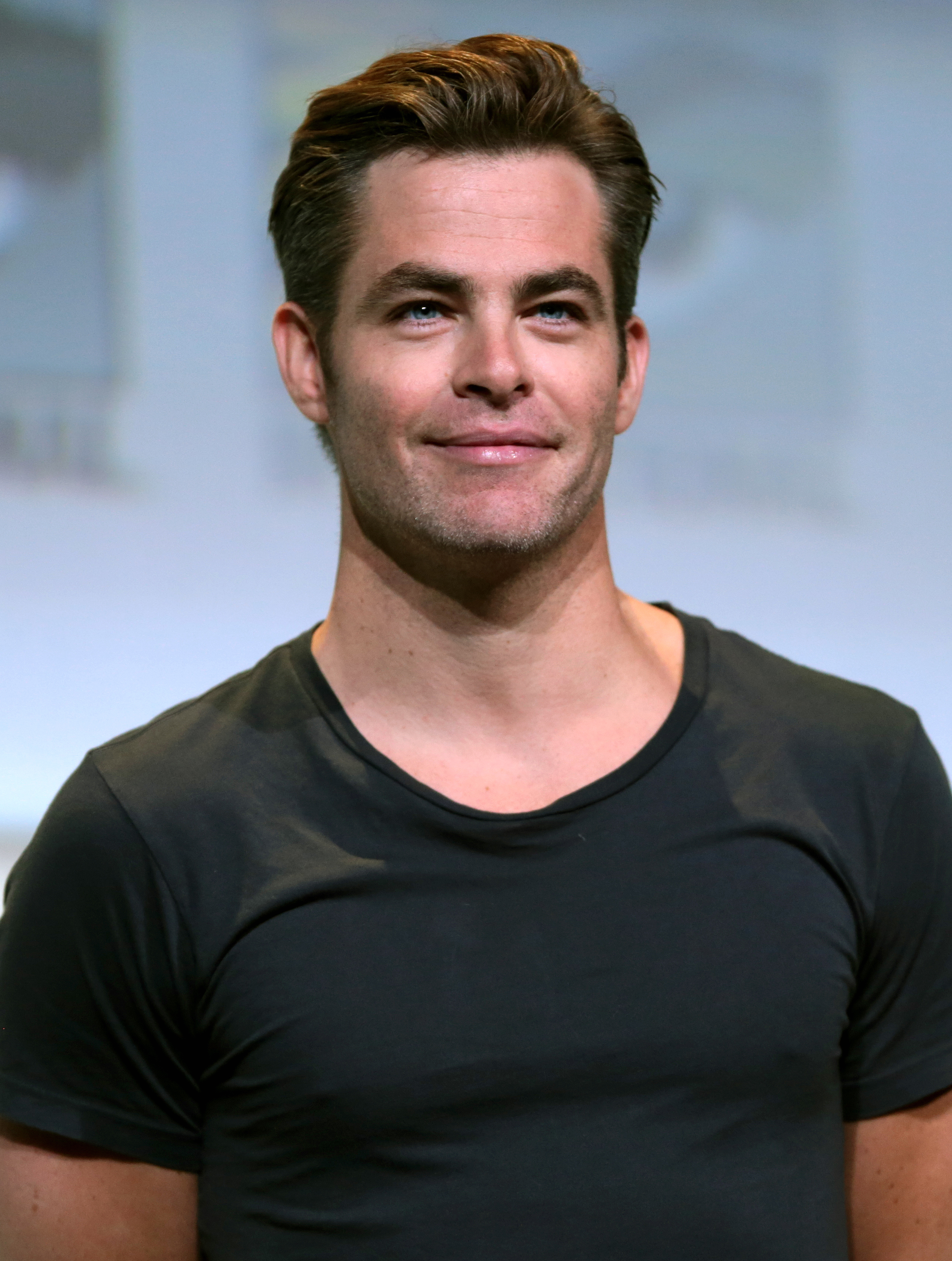
Chris Pine, BA 2002, actor (Captain James T. Kirk in the 2009 Academy Award-winning film Star Trek)

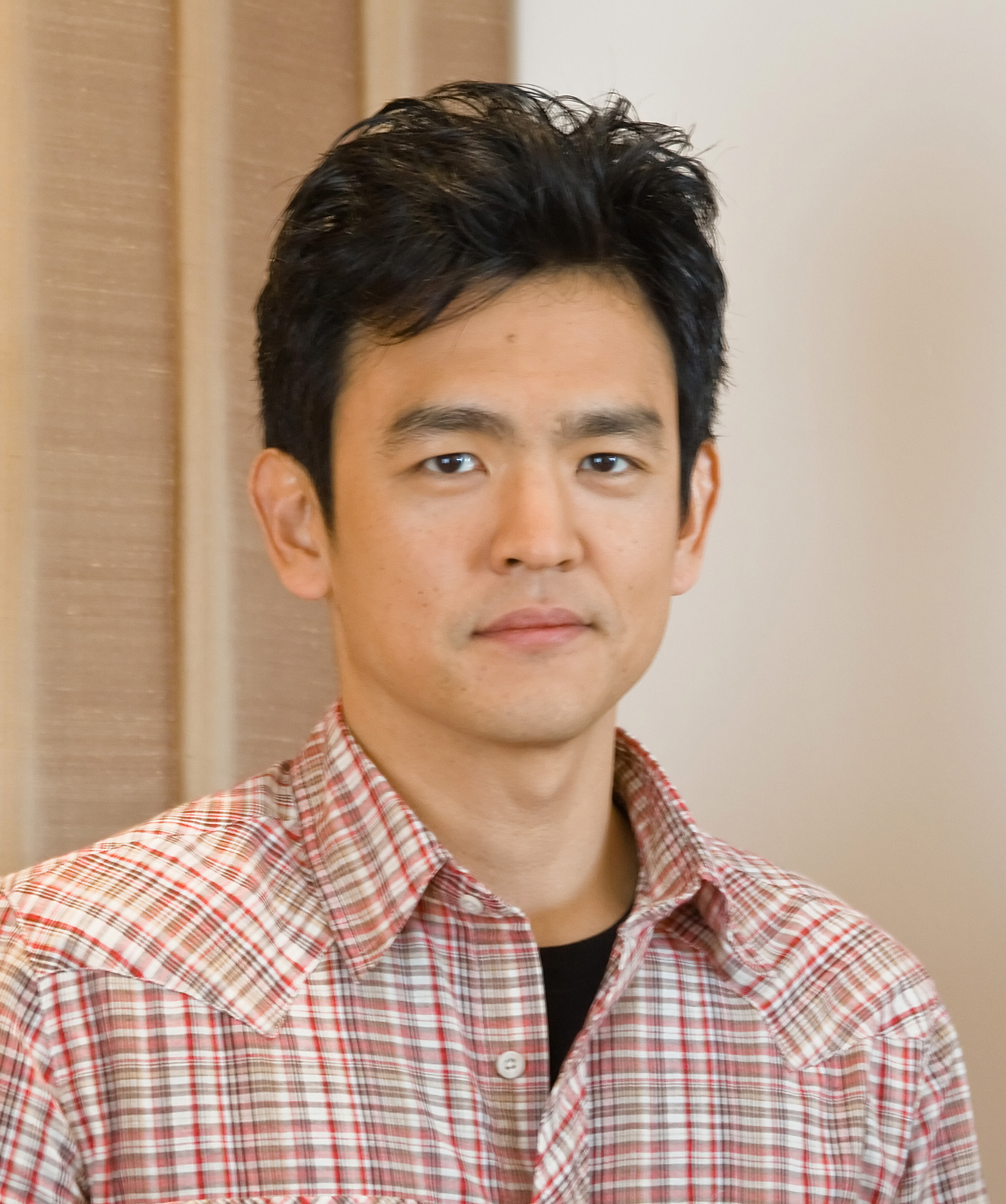
John Cho, BA 1996, actor (portrayed Hikaru Sulu in the 2009 Academy Award-winning film Star Trek and portrayed Harold Lee in the Harold & Kumar film series)

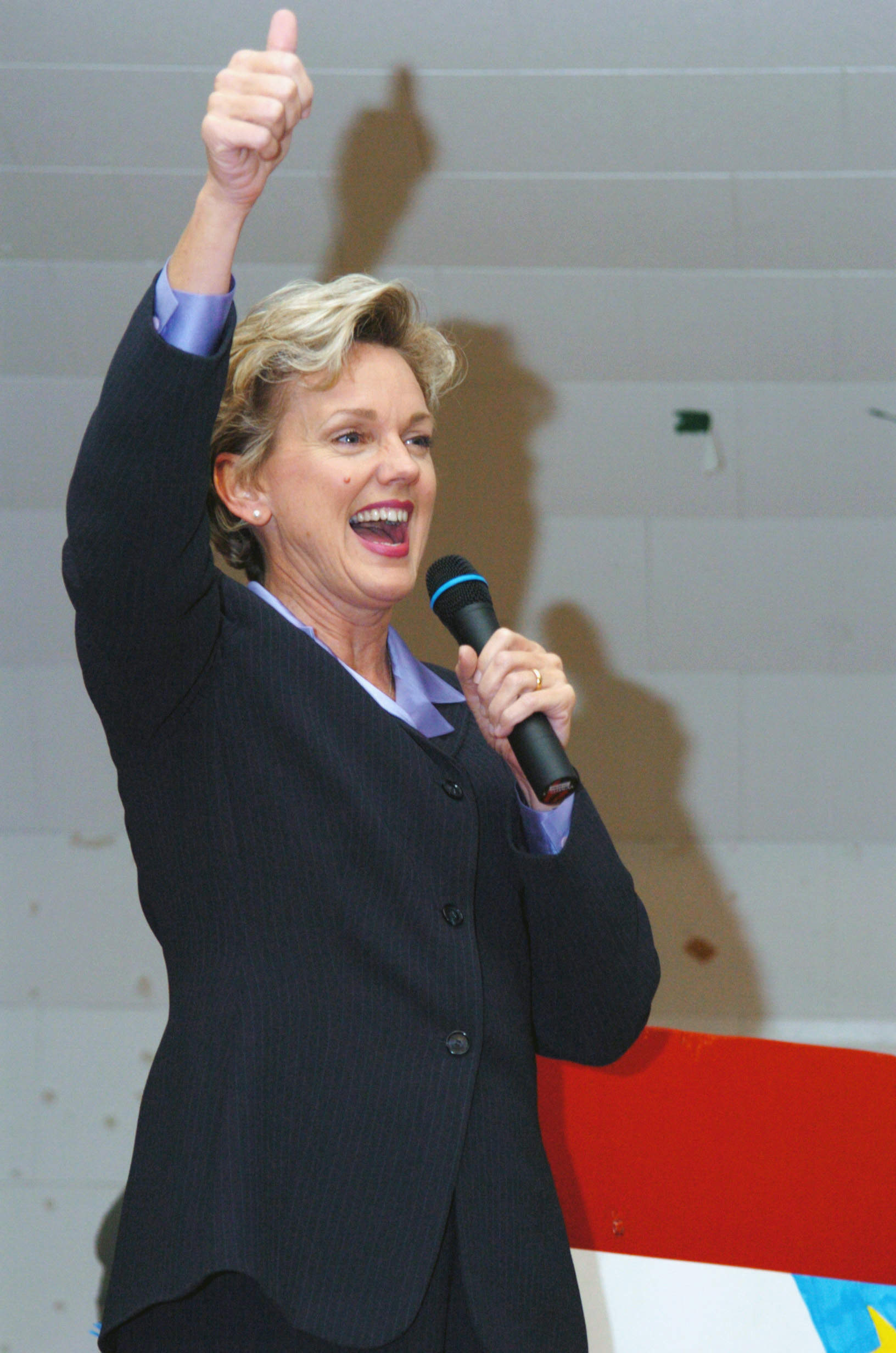
Governor of Michigan Jennifer Granholm, BA 1984

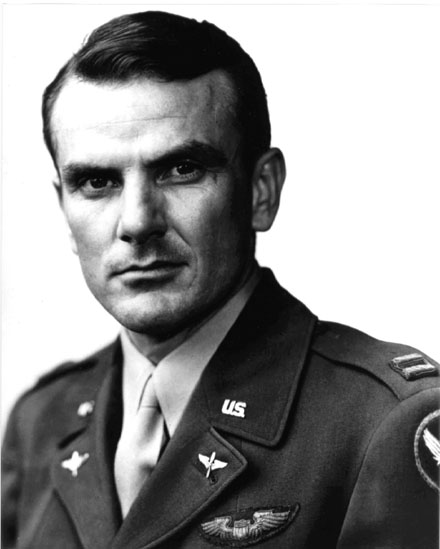
Captain Glen Edwards, BS 1941, namesake of Edwards Air Force Base (where the Space Shuttle has landed 53 times)

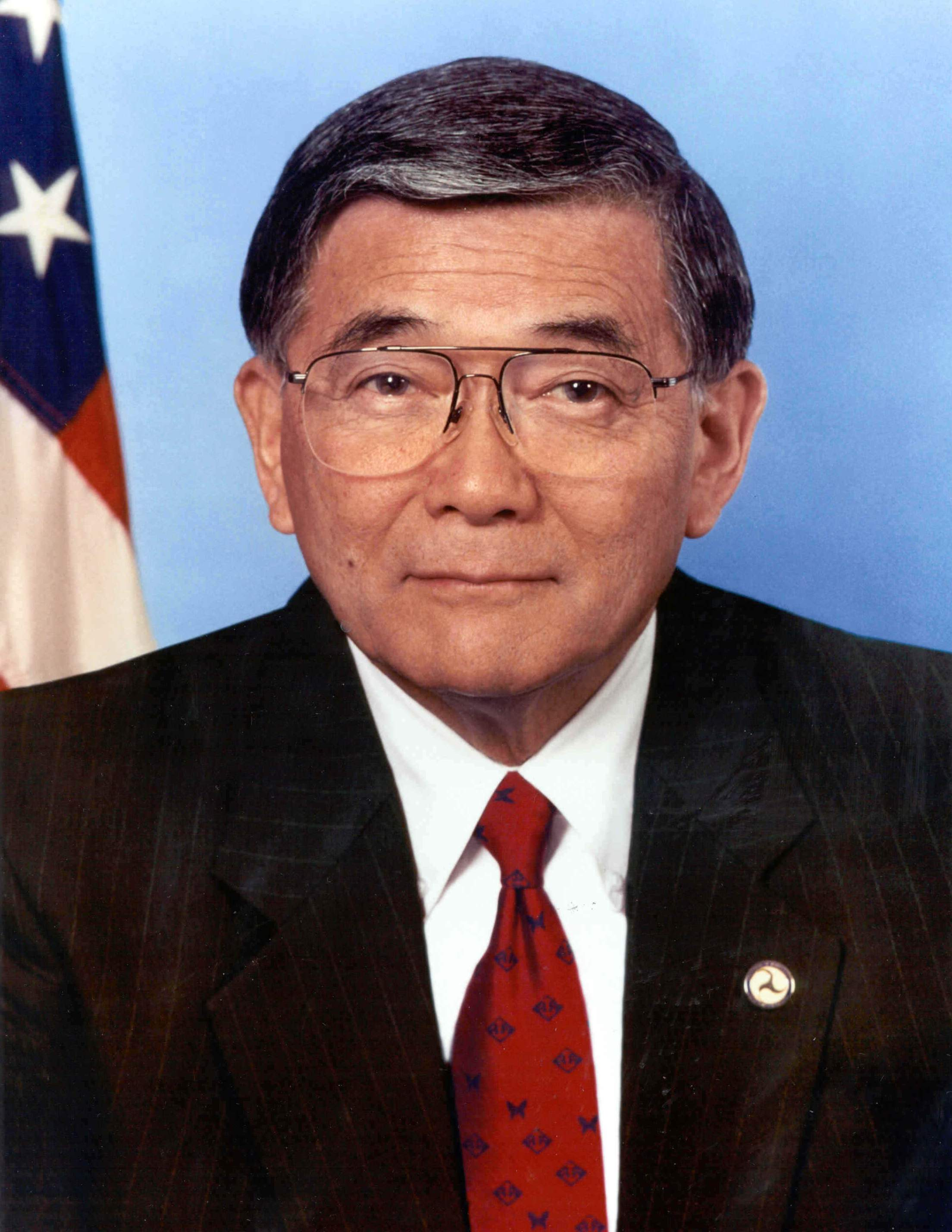
Norman Mineta, BS 1953; Secretary of Transportation and Secretary of Commerce; namesake of the Mineta San Jose International Airport; the first Asian American to serve in the Cabinet of the United States

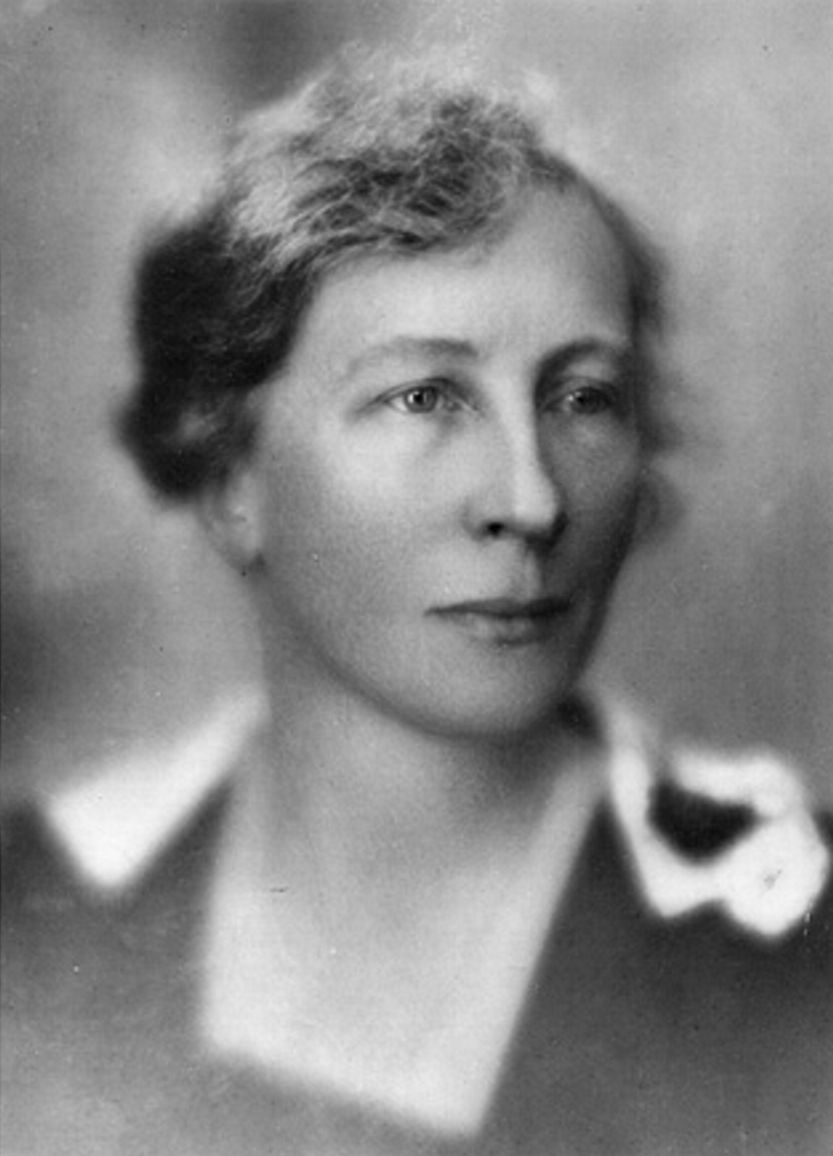
Lillian Moller Gilbreth, BA 1900, MA 1902, industrial/organizational psychologist and subject of the book (and film) Cheaper by the Dozen

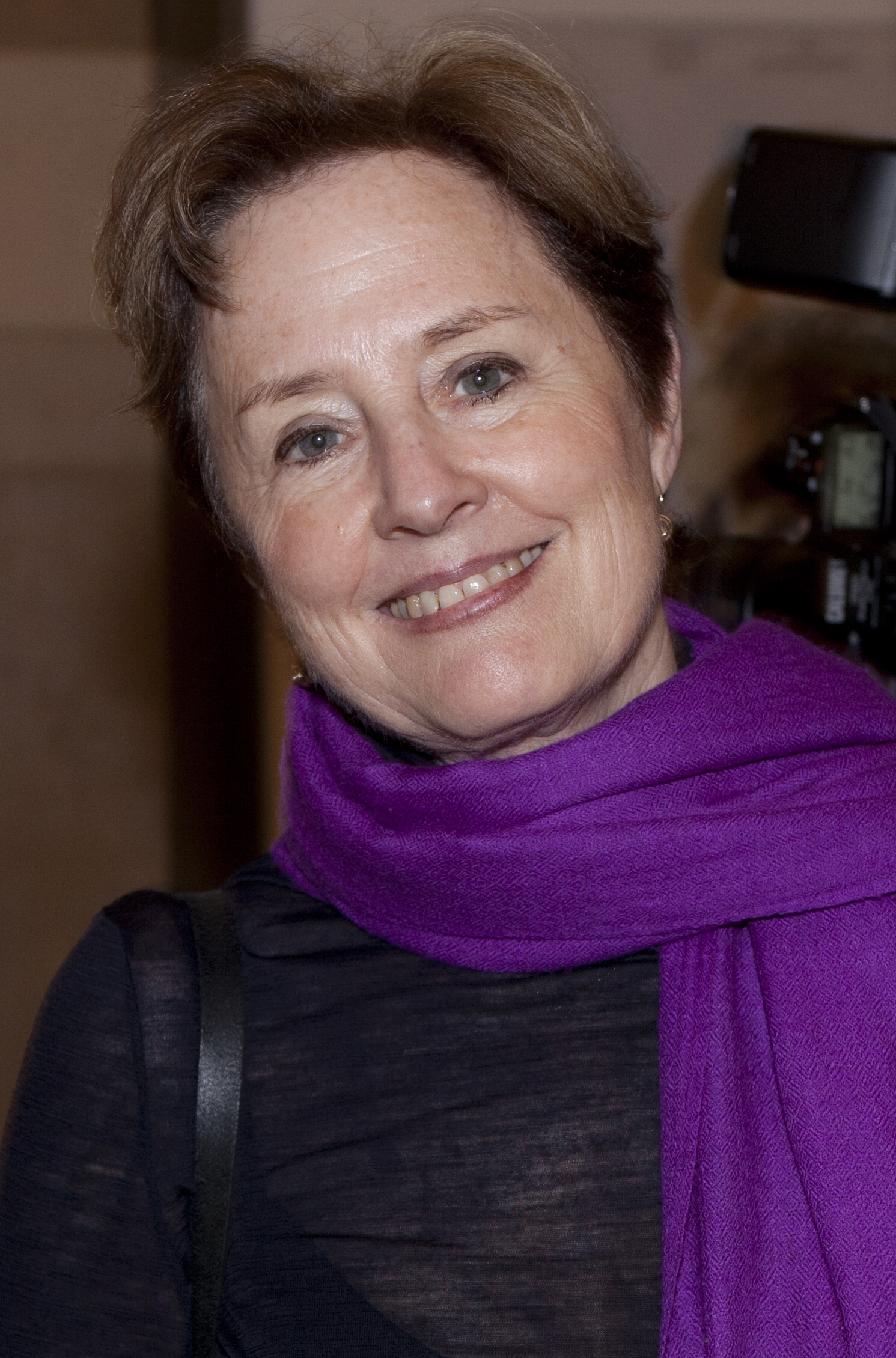
Alice Waters, BA 1967, celebrity chef, founder of restaurant Chez Panisse, originator of California cuisine; 2015 National Humanities Medal recipient

GTK was created by Peter Mattis, BS 1997.

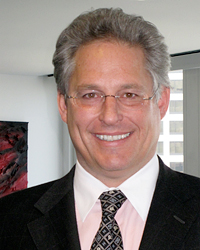
Mark Anchor Albert, BA 1984, lawyer, philanthropist, founder of the Queen of Angels Foundation

Name	Degree(s)	Prize year	Prize field	Reason (prize citation)	Additional notability
Frances H. Arnold	Ph.D. 1985	2018	Chemistry	"for the directed evolution of enzymes"	also listed in §National Medal of Technology; Dick and Barbara Dickinson Professor of Chemical Engineering, Bioengineering, and Biochemistry at Caltech
Barry Barish	B.S. 1957, Ph.D. 1962	2017	Physics	"for decisive contributions to the LIGO detector and the observation of gravitational waves"	
**Carolyn R. Bertozzi**	Ph.D. 1993	2022	Chemistry	"for the development of click chemistry and bioorthogonal chemistry"	
Thomas Cech	Ph.D. 1975	1989	Chemistry	"for the discovery of catalytic properties of RNA"	
**Owen Chamberlain**	Attended (1941-42)	1959	Physics	"for the discovery of the antiproton"	
**Steven Chu**	Ph.D. 1976	1997	Physics	"for the development of methods to cool and trap atoms with laser light"	Secretary of Energy in the Obama administration
Robert Curl	Ph.D. 1957	1996	Chemistry	"for the discovery of fullerenes"	
Joseph Erlanger	B.S. 1895	1944	Medicine	"for discoveries relating to the highly differentiated functions of single nerve fibres"	
Andrew Fire	B.A. 1978	2006	Medicine	"for the discovery of RNA interference – gene silencing by double–stranded RNA"	
**William F. Giauque**	B.S. 1920, Ph.D. 1922	1949	Chemistry	"for his contributions in the field of chemical thermodynamics, particularly concerning the behaviour of substances at extremely low temperatures"	
Carol W. Greider	Ph.D. 1987	2009	Medicine	"for the discovery of how chromosomes are protected by telomeres and the enzyme telomerase"	Daniel Nathans Professor; director of Molecular Biology and Genetics at the Johns Hopkins University
David Gross	Ph.D. 1966	2004	Physics	"for the discovery of asymptotic freedom in the theory of the strong interaction"	
Alan Heeger	Ph.D. 1961	2000	Chemistry	"for the discovery and development of conductive polymers"	
David Julius	Ph.D. 1984	2021	Medicine	"for the discoveries of receptors for temperature and touch"	
Daniel Kahneman	Ph.D. 1961	2002	Economics	"for having integrated insights from psychological research into economic science, especially concerning human judgment and decision–making under uncertainty"	
Lawrence Klein	B.A. 1942	1980	Economics	"for the creation of econometric models and the application to the analysis of economic fluctuations and economic policies"	
Willis Lamb	B.S. 1934, Ph.D. 1938	1955	Physics	"for his discoveries concerning the fine structure of the hydrogen spectrum"	
Robert Laughlin	B.A. 1972	1998	Physics	"for the discovery of a new form of quantum fluid with fractionally charged excitations"	
**Yuan T. Lee**	Ph.D. 1962	1986	Chemistry	"for contributions concerning the dynamics of chemical elementary processes"	professor of Chemistry; principal investigator, Materials and Molecular Research Division, Lawrence Berkeley Laboratory
**Willard Libby**	B.S. 1931, Ph.D. 1933	1960	Chemistry	"for his method to use carbon–14 for age determination in archaeology, geology, geophysics, and other branches of science"	professor of Chemistry
Robert Lucas Jr.	Attended (1959-60)	1995	Economics	"for having developed and applied the hypothesis of rational expectations, and thereby having transformed macroeconomic analysis and deepened our understanding of economic policy"	
John C. Mather	Ph.D. 1974	2006	Physics	"for the discovery of the blackbody form and anisotropy of the cosmic microwave background radiation"	
Mario Molina	Ph.D. 1972	1995	Chemistry	"for work in atmospheric chemistry, particularly concerning the formation and decomposition of ozone"	
Kary Mullis	Ph.D. 1973	1993	Chemistry	"for his invention of the polymerase chain reaction (PCR) method"	
Douglass North	B.A. 1942, Ph.D. 1952	1993	Economics	"for having renewed research in economic history by applying economic theory and quantitative methods in order to explain economic and institutional change"	
**Saul Perlmutter**	Ph.D. 1986	2011	Physics	"for the discovery of the accelerating expansion of the Universe through observations of distant supernovae"	professor of Physics at UC Berkeley; co–discoverer of dark energy as head of the Supernova Cosmology Project
Gary Ruvkun	B.A. 1973	2024	Medicine	"for the discovery of microRNA and its role in post-transcriptional gene regulation"	
Thomas J. Sargent	B.A. 1964	2011	Economics	"for empirical research on cause and effect in the macroeconomy"	William R. Berkley Professor of Economics and Business at New York University
Thomas Schelling	B.A. 1944	2005	Economics	"for having enhanced our understanding of conflict and cooperation through game–theory analysis"	
**Glenn T. Seaborg**	Ph.D. 1937	1951	Chemistry	"for discoveries in the chemistry of the transuranium elements"	University Professor of Chemistry; associate director, Lawrence Berkeley Laboratory; chancellor, Berkeley campus (1958–1961)
William F. Sharpe	Attended (1951-52)	1990	Economics	"for pioneering work in the theory of financial economics"	
Christopher A. Sims	Attended (1963-64)	2011	Economics	for "empirical research on cause and effect in the macroeconomy"	
Hamilton O. Smith	B.A. 1952	1978	Medicine	"for the discovery of restriction enzymes and their application to problems of molecular genetics"	
**Otto Stern**	L.L.D 1930	1943	Physics	"for his contribution to the development of the molecular ray method and his discovery of the magnetic moment of the proton"	
Henry Taube	Ph.D. 1940	1983	Chemistry	"for his work on the mechanisms of electron transfer reactions, especially in metal complexes"	
Harold Urey	Ph.D. 1923	1934	Chemistry	"for his discovery of heavy hydrogen"	
Selman Waksman	Ph.D. 1918	1952	Medicine	"for his discovery of streptomycin, the first antibiotic effective against tuberculosis"	
David J. Wineland	BA Physics 1965	2012	Physics	"for ground–breaking experimental methods that enable measuring and manipulation of individual quantum systems"	

== Turing Award laureates ==
The Turing Award is considered to be the "Nobel Prize" of computer science.

Name	Degree(s)	Prize year	Reason (prize citation)	Additional notability
Leonard Adleman	B.A. 1968, Ph.D. 1976,	2002	for the "ingenious contribution for making public–key cryptography useful in practice"	co-author of the RSA encryption algorithm for computer security
Douglas C. Engelbart	B.Eng. 1952, Ph.D. 1955	1997	"for an inspiring vision of the future of interactive computing and the invention of key technologies to help realize this vision"	inventor of the computer mouse; recipient of the National Medal of Technology in 2000, pioneer in hypertext and networked computers
Shafi Goldwasser	M.S. 1981, Ph.D. 1983	2012	"for transformative work that laid the complexity–theoretic foundations for the science of cryptography and in the process pioneered new methods for efficient verification of mathematical proofs in complexity theory"	professor of computer science and the mathematical sciences at the Weizmann Institute of Science;, recipient of two Gödel Prizes (1993, "for the development of interactive proof systems" and 2001 "for the PCP theorem and its applications to hardness of approximation"); RSA Professor of electrical engineering and computer science at MIT
Jim Gray	B.S. 1966, Ph.D. 1969	2001	"for seminal contributions to database and transaction processing research and technical leadership in system implementation"	
Butler Lampson	Ph.D. 1967	1992	"for contributions to the development of distributed, personal computing environments and the technology for their implementation: workstations, networks, operating systems, programming systems, displays, security and document publishing"	founding member of Xerox PARC, major contributor to the development of the personal computer
Barbara Liskov	B.A. 1961	2008	"for contributions to practical and theoretical foundations of programming language and system design, especially related to data abstraction, fault tolerance, and distributed computing"	first woman in the United States to earn a Ph.D. in Computer Science (in 1968 at Stanford), creator of CLU, professor at MIT
Silvio Micali	Ph.D. 1982	2012	"for transformative work that laid the complexity–theoretic foundations for the science of cryptography and in the process pioneered new methods for efficient verification of mathematical proofs in complexity theory"; recipient of the Gödel Prize in 1993 "for the development of interactive proof systems"	Ford Professor of Engineering at MIT
Dana Scott	B.S. 1954	1976	for "the joint paper (with Rabin) "Finite Automata and Their Decision Problem", which introduced the idea of nondeterministic machines, which has proved to be an enormously valuable concept. Their (Scott & Rabin) classic paper has been a continuous source of inspiration for subsequent work in this field"	former associate professor of Math at UC Berkeley, professor emeritus at Carnegie Mellon University
Charles P. Thacker	B.A. 1967	2009	"for the pioneering design and realization of the first modern personal computer—the Alto at Xerox PARC—and seminal inventions and contributions to local area networks (including the Ethernet), multiprocessor workstations, snooping cache coherence protocols, and tablet personal computers"	Microsoft Technical Fellow, chief designer of the Alto computer at Xerox PARC, co–inventor of Ethernet, recipient of the IEEE John von Neumann Medal in 2007, recipient of the Draper Prize in 2004
Ken Thompson	B.S. 1965, M.S. 1966	1983	for the "development of generic operating systems theory and specifically for the implementation of the UNIX operating system"	co–creator of the Unix operating system
Niklaus Wirth	Ph.D. 1967	1984	"for developing a sequence of innovative computer languages, EULER, ALGOL–W, MODULA and Pascal"	creator of the Pascal programming language

== Academy Award ==
=== Recipients ===
Name	Degree(s)	Notability
Mark Berger	B.A. 1964	recipient of four Academy Awards for sound mixing; adjunct professor at UC Berkeley
Paul E. Debevec	Ph.D. 1996	associate director of Graphics Research at the University of Southern California's Institute for Creative Technologies, recipient of a Scientific and Technical Academy Award in 2010 for work used on the James Cameron film Avatar, the Sam Raimi film Spider–Man 2, and the Peter Jackson film King Kong
Charles H. Ferguson	B.A. 1978	recipient of an Academy Award for Best Documentary for Inside Job (2010), Academy Award nomination for the documentary film No End in Sight (2007), former fellow at the Brookings Institution, lifelong member of the Council on Foreign Relations, co-founder of Vermeer Technologies Incorporated (acquired by Microsoft for $133 million), founder and president of Representational Pictures
Edith Head	B.A. 1918	costume designer, recipient of eight Academy Awards and nominated for 34 Academy Awards
Sidney Howard	B.A. 1915	screenwriter and dramatist, recipient of the 1940 Academy Award for Best Adapted Screenplay for Gone with the Wind and the 1925 Pulitzer Prize for Drama for They Knew What They Wanted
Chris Innis	B.A.	recipient of the Academy Award for Best Film Editing (for The Hurt Locker (2010))
Joe Letteri	B.A. 1981	recipient of four Academy Awards for Best Visual Effects in films directed by James Cameron (Avatar) and Peter Jackson (King Kong, The Two Towers and The Return of the King)
Freida Lee Mock	B.A. 1961	documentary filmmaker, recipient of the Academy Award for Best Documentary in 1995 (for Maya Lin: A Strong Clear Vision)
Megan Mylan	M.J. 1997, M.A. 1997	recipient of an Academy Award for Best Documentary Short for Smile Pinki (2009)
Marc Norman	B.A. 1962, M.A. 1964	recipient of the Academy Award for Best Original Screenplay (shared with Tom Stoppard) and Academy Award for Best Picture (as co-producer) for Shakespeare in Love (1999)
Gregory Peck	B.A. 1942	actor, recipient of the Academy Award for Best Actor for portrayal of Atticus Finch in To Kill a Mockingbird (1962), nominated for the Oscar four other times; served as president of the Screen Actors Guild
Walter Plunkett	B.A. 1923	costume designer, recipient of the Academy Award for Best Costume Design for the 1951 film An American in Paris starring Gene Kelly
Loren L. Ryder	B.A. 1924	audio sound engineer, recipient of six Academy Awards, nominated for twelve more Academy Awards
Will Vinton	B.A. 1970	pioneer of Claymation® (clay animation), co–recipient of the Academy Award for Best Animated Short Film in 1974 (Closed Mondays), namesake and founder of Will Vinton Studios (known for The California Raisins and the Domino's Pizza Noid), recipient of two Primetime Emmy Awards for Outstanding Animation programs (A Claymation Christmas Celebration and A Claymation Easter)
Petro Vlahos	B.S. 1941	pioneer in traveling matte (blue–screen and green–screen) visual effects technology (used in films such as Ben–Hur, Mary Poppins, and the first Star Wars trilogy), recipient of five special Academy Awards and an Emmy Award
Michael Wilson	B.A. 1936	screenwriter, recipient of two Academy Awards for Best Adapted Screenplay (for the 1951 film A Place in the Sun and the 1957 film The Bridge on the River Kwai); nominated for the Academy Award for three other films (for the 1953 film 5 Fingers, the 1956 Academy Award–nominated film Friendly Persuasion, and the Academy Award–winning 1962 Best Picture film Lawrence of Arabia); also co–screenwriter for the 1968 Academy Award–winning film Planet of the Apes

=== Nominees ===
Name	Degree(s)	Notability
Adam Duritz	(attended)	lead singer-songwriter of Counting Crows, nominated for the Academy Award for Best Original Song for Shrek 2 at the 77th Academy Awards
Jon H. Else	B.A. 1968	Prix Italia recipient (The Day After Trinity), recipient of four Emmy Awards, nominated twice for the Academy Award (for the documentaries The Day After Trinity and Arthur and Lillie), cinematographer on the Academy Award–winning Who Are the DeBolts? And Where Did They Get Nineteen Kids?, 1999 winner of the Sundance Film Festival Filmmaker's Trophy, MacArthur Genius Grant Fellow, professor of journalism at UC Berkeley
Dan Krauss	M.A. Journalism 2004	nominated twice for Best Documentary Short Subject (for The Death of Kevin Carter: Casualty of the Bang Bang Club and Extremis)
Melissa Mathison	B.A.	screenwriter, nominated for an Academy Award for Best Original Screenplay for the Steven Spielberg film E.T. the Extra-Terrestrial; known also for the Francis Ford Coppola film The Black Stallion and the Martin Scorsese film Kundun
Daphne Matziaraki	M.A. Journalism 2016	nominated for Best Documentary Short Subject (4.1 Miles)
David Peoples	BA English	screenwriter (the Ridley Scott film Blade Runner and the Terry Gilliam film 12 Monkeys), nominated for the Academy Award for Best Screenplay for the Clint Eastwood film Unforgiven (which did win the Academy Award for Best Picture); collaborator with Jon Else (BA 1968) on the Academy Award-winning documentary Who Are the DeBolts? And Where Did They Get Nineteen Kids? and the Academy Award-nominated documentary The Day After Trinity
James Schamus	BA, MA, PhD	screenwriter, nominated for the Academy Award for Best Adapted Screenplay and Academy Award for Best Original Song for the Ang Lee movie Crouching Tiger, Hidden Dragon; producer; co-founder and inaugural CEO of movie studio Focus Features

== Pulitzer Prize ==
Name	Degree(s)	Award year	Award category	Additional notability
Darrin Bell	B.A. 1999	2019	Editorial Cartooning	
Alexandra Berzon	M.A. 2006	2009	Public Service	
Alexandra Berzon	M.A. 2006	2019	National Reporting	
Rube Goldberg	B.S. 1904	1948	Editorial Cartooning	cartoonist; namesake of "Rube Goldberg device"
William Randolph Hearst Jr.	Attended	1956	International Reporting	
Marguerite Higgins	B.A. 1941	1951	International Reporting	journalist; honored on a commemorative postal stamp issued by the United States Post Office
Stephen Hobbs	M.A. 2014	2019	Public Service	
Sidney Howard	B.A. 1915	1925	Drama (for They Knew What They Wanted)	recipient of the 1940 Academy Award for Best Adapted Screenplay for Gone with the Wind
Leon Litwack	B.A. 1951, PhD 1958	1980	History (for his book Been In the Storm So Long: The Aftermath of Slavery)	professor emeritus of history at UC Berkeley
T. Christian Miller	B.A. 1992	2016	Explanatory Reporting	lecturer at the UC Berkeley Graduate School of Journalism
Sonia Nazario	M.A. 1988	2003	Feature Writing	journalist at the Los Angeles Times
Viet Thanh Nguyen	B.A. 1992, PhD 1997	2016	Fiction for his novel The Sympathizer	Novelist
Matt Richtel	B.A. 1989	2010	National Reporting	co–author of the comic strip Rudy Park under the pen name "Theron Heir"
Robert Penn Warren	M.A. 1927	1946	Fiction for All the King's Men	All the King's Men (1946) was later made into a movie of the same name which won three Academy Awards
Robert Penn Warren	M.A. 1927	1953	Poetry	All the King's Men (1946) was later made into a movie of the same name which won three Academy Awards
Robert Penn Warren	M.A. 1927	1979	Poetry	All the King's Men (1946) was later made into a movie of the same name which won three Academy Awards
Greg Winter	M.A. Journalism 2000	2015	International Reporting	

== Emmy Award ==
Name	Degree(s)	Notability
Yahya Abdul-Mateen II	B.A. Architecture 2008	actor, Emmy Award for Outstanding Supporting Actor in a Limited Series (2020)
Kathy Baker	B.A. 1977	three-time recipient of the Emmy Award, actress (Picket Fences (1992–1996); The Right Stuff (1983), Edward Scissorhands (1990), The Cider House Rules (1999), Cold Mountain (2003)
Christine Chen	BA 1990	journalist, former news Anchor for KSTW and KCPQ–TV (both in Seattle, Washington), recipient of two Emmy Awards (1996 and 2002); principal of marketing communications consulting company Chen Communications
Liz Claman	B.A. 1985	journalist, current Fox Business anchor (Countdown to the Closing Bell), former CNBC Morning Call co–anchor, recipient of two Emmy Awards for broadcast production and journalism
**Jon H. Else**	B.A. 1968	Prix Italia recipient (The Day After Trinity), recipient of four Emmy Awards, nominated twice for the Academy Award, 1999 winner of the Sundance Film Festival Filmmaker's Trophy, MacArthur Genius Grant Fellow, cinematographer on the Academy Award–winning Who Are the DeBolts? And Where Did They Get Nineteen Kids?, professor of journalism at UC Berkeley
Jonathan Jones	MA 2005	2015 Emmy Award in Outstanding Long Form Investigative Journalism, 2015 Emmy Award in Outstanding Research
Elisabeth Leamy	BA	Consumer Correspondent for ABC's Good Morning America, recipient of 13 Emmy Awards in broadcast journalism
Andrew Schneider	B.A. 1973	screenwriter and executive producer, recipient of two Emmy Awards (for Northern Exposure and The Sopranos)
Leroy Sievers	B.A.	news journalist, executive producer of news program Nightline, recipient of 12 national news Emmy Awards, two Peabody Awards, and two Alfred I. duPont–Columbia University Awards
Kristen Sze	B.A.	journalist, TV news anchor for KGO–TV (in the San Francisco Bay area), former New York correspondent for Extra, recipient of two Emmy Awards for broadcast journalism
Jon F. Vein	BS in Material Sciences and EECS	chief operating officer of Film Roman; producer; 2001 Emmy Award for Outstanding Animation for The Simpsons; co-founder and CEO of MarketShare (acquired for $450 million by Neustar)
Will Vinton	B.A. Architecture 1970	pioneer of Claymation® (clay animation), co–recipient of the Academy Award for Best Animated Short Film in 1974 (Closed Mondays), namesake and founder of Will Vinton Studios (known for The California Raisins and the Domino's Pizza Noid), recipient of two Primetime Emmy Awards for Outstanding Animation programs (A Claymation Christmas Celebration and A Claymation Easter) (also listed in Academy Awards section)
Petro Vlahos	BS Eng 1941	pioneer in traveling matte (blue–screen and green–screen) visual effects technology (used in films such as Ben–Hur, Mary Poppins, and the first Star Wars trilogy), recipient of five special Academy Awards and an Emmy Award (also listed in Academy Awards section)

== Fields Medal ==
Name	Degree(s)	Fields Medal Award year	Additional notability
Michael Freedman	(undergraduate attendee)	1986	Berkeley mathematics lecturer (1973–1975)
William Thurston	Ph.D. 1972	1982	Berkeley professor of mathematics (1991–1996)
Shing–Tung Yau (Chinese: 丘成桐)	Ph.D. 1971	1982	National Medal of Science in 1997

== Wolf Prize ==
Name	Degree(s)	Award year	Award field	Wolf Prize citation	Additional notability
**Paul Alivisatos**	Ph.D. 1986	2012	Chemistry	for the development of "the colloidal inorganic nanocrystal as a building block of nanoscience making fundamental contributions to controlling the synthesis of these particles, to measuring and understanding their physical properties, and to utilizing their unique properties for applications ranging from light generation and harvesting to biological imaging"	
**Carolyn R. Bertozzi**	Ph.D. 1993	2022	Chemistry	for "seminal contributions to understanding the chemistry of cellular communication and inventing chemical methodologies to study the role of carbohydrates, lipids, and proteins in such biological processes"	
Henry Eyring	Ph.D. 1927	1980	Chemistry	"for his development of absolute rate theory and its imaginative applications to chemical and physical processes"	
George Feher	B.S. 1950, M.S. 1951, Ph.D. 1954	2006/2007	Chemistry	"for the ingenious structural discoveries of the ribosomal machinery of peptide–bond formation and the light–driven primary processes in photosynthesis"	inventor of electron nuclear double resonance (ENDOR); professor at the University of California, San Diego
Herbert S. Gutowsky	M.S. 1946	1983/1984	Chemistry	"for his pioneering work in the development and applications of nuclear magnetic resonance spectroscopy in chemistry	
Bertrand Halperin	Ph.D. 1965	2002/2003	Physics	"for key insights into the broad range of condensed matter physics... on two– dimensional melting, disordered systems and strongly interacting electrons"	Hollis Professor of Mathematics and Natural Philosophy at Harvard University
**John F. Hartwig**	PhD 1990	2019	Chemistry	"for the development of efficient transition-metal catalysts that have revolutionized drug manufacturing, leading to breakthroughs in molecule and synthetics design"	Henry Rapoport Professor of Chemistry at UC Berkeley (2011–present)
Elizabeth Neufeld	PhD 1956	1988	Medicine	"for the biochemical elucidation of lysosomal storage diseases and the resulting contributions to biology, pathology, prenatal diagnosis, and therapeutics"	
**George C. Pimentel**	Ph.D. 1949	1982	Chemistry	for the "development of matrix isolation spectroscopy and for the discovery of photodissociation lasers and chemical lasers"	professor at UC Berkeley (1949–1989); inventor of the chemical laser
Gary Ruvkun	B.A. Biophysics 1973	2014	Medicine	"for the discovery of the micro–RNA molecules that play a key role in controlling gene expression in natural processes and disease development"	
**Gabor A. Somorjai**	Ph.D. 1960	1998	Chemistry	for "outstanding contributions to the field of the surface science in general, and for their elucidation of fundamental mechanisms of heterogeneous catalytic reactions at single crystal surfaces in particular"	professor of chemistry at University of California, Berkeley (1964–present)
Chien-Shiung Wu	Ph.D. 1940	1978	Physics	"for her explorations of the weak interaction, helping establish the precise form and the non–conservation of parity for this natural force "; first female president of the American Physical Society	professor of physics at Columbia University (1940–1980)
Shing-Tung Yau	Ph.D. 1971	2010	Mathematics	"for his work in geometric analysis that has had a profound and dramatic impact on many areas of geometry and physics" (also listed in Fields Medal)	professor of mathematics at Harvard University; Fields Medal laureate; recipient of the Wolf Prize (Mathematics, 2010)
**David Zilberman**	PhD 1979	2019	Agriculture	"for developing economic models that address fundamental issues in agriculture, economics and policymaking"	professor (holder of the Robinson Chair) in the Agricultural and Resource Economics Department at UC Berkeley (1979–present)

== National Humanities Medal ==
Name	Degree(s)	Award year	National Humanities Medal citation	Additional notability
Stephen Balch	MA 1967, PhD 1972	2007	"for leadership and advocacy upholding the noblest traditions in higher education"	founder of the National Association of Scholars, founder of the American Academy for Liberal Education, founding member and trustee of the American Council of Trustees and Alumni, founder of the Study of Western Civilization
Joan Didion	BA 1956	2013	"her mastery of style in writing. Exploring the culture around us and exposing the depths of sorrow, Ms. Didion has produced works of startling honesty and fierce intellect, rendered personal stories universal, and illuminated the seemingly peripheral details that are central to our lives"	writer, author of Slouching Towards Bethlehem (1968), The White Album (1979), and The Year of Magical Thinking (2005)
Maxine Hong Kingston	B.A. 1962	1997	"her contributions as a writer. Her novels and non–fiction have examined how the past influences our present, and her voice has strengthened our understanding of Asian American identity, helping shape our national conversation about culture, gender, and race"	author; senior lecturer at UC Berkeley; recipient of the National Medal of Arts in 2013
Ramón Eduardo Ruiz	PhD 1954	1998		Ppofessor of History (specializing in Mexico and Latin America) at the University of California, San Diego
Henry Snyder	BA, MA, PhD	2007	"for visionary leadership in bridging the worlds of scholarship and technology"	professor emeritus of History (specializing in Britain) at the University of California, Riverside; 2009 officer of the Most Excellent Order of the British Empire medal (bestowed by Queen Elizabeth II)
Kevin Starr	M.L.S. 1974	2006		professor of Urban and Regional Planning and professor of History (specializing in California) at the University of Southern California
Alice Waters	B.A. 1967	2015	for "celebrating the bond between the ethical and the edible. As a chef, author, and advocate, Ms. Waters champions a holistic approach to eating and health and celebrates integrating gardening, cooking, and education, sparking inspiration in a new generation"	celebrity chef, founder of restaurant Chez Panisse, originator of California cuisine; member of the American Academy of Arts and Sciences; recipient of five James Beard Foundation Awards (1984 Who's Who of Food & Beverage, 1997 Fruits & Vegetables, 1992 Outstanding Chef, 1992 Outstanding Restaurant, 1997 Humanitarian of the Year, 2004 Lifetime Achievement)

== National Medal of Science ==
Name	Degree(s)	Award year	National Medal of Science citation	Additional notability
Philip Abelson	PhD 1939	1987	"for his path–breaking contributions in radiochemistry, physics, geophysics, biophysics, and biochemistry and for his vigorous and penetrating counsel on national matters involving science and technology"	physicist and science writer; co–discoverer of neptunium
Berni Alder	BS 1947, MS 1948	2009	"for establishing powerful computer methods useful for molecular dynamics simulations, conceiving and executing experimental shock–wave simulations to obtain properties of fluids and solids at very high pressures, and developing Monte Carlo methods for calculating the properties of matter from first principles, all of which contributed to major achievements in the science of condensed matter"	
Paul Alivisatos	PhD 1986	2014	"for his foundational contributions to the field of nanoscience; for the development of nanocrystals as a building block of nanotechnologies; and for his leadership in the nanoscience community"	also listed in §Wolf Prize
Daniel I. Arnon	BS 1932, PhD 1936	1973	"for fundamental research into the mechanism of green plant utilization of light to produce chemical energy and oxygen and for contributions to our understanding of plant nutrition"	professor of cell physiology at UC Berkeley specializing in photosynthesis
John N. Bahcall	B.S. 1956	1998	"for his fundamental contributions to areas of modern astrophysics ranging from solar neutrino physics to the structure of the Milky Way Galaxy to cosmology, and for his leadership of the astronomical community, especially his tireless advocacy of the Hubble Space Telescope"	astrophysicist, best known for his work on the Standard Solar Model and the Hubble Space Telescope; recipient of the NASA Distinguished Public Service Medal in 1992, co–winner of the Fermi award in 2003
John Isaiah Brauman	PhD 1963	2002	"for his seminal contributions in chemistry, giving new insight into the properties of ions and the dynamics and mechanisms of reactions, and for his landmark achievement in clarifying the key role of solvent in determining acid–base chemistry"	
John W. Cahn	Ph.D. 1953	1998	"for his pioneering work on thermodynamics and kinetics of phase transitions and diffusion, on interfacial phenomena, and for his contributions to the understanding of periodic and quasi–periodic structures"	materials scientist
Thomas Cech	PhD 1975	1995	"for his discoveries regarding RNA catalysis that have added new dimensions to the understanding of the role of RNA in living systems"	Distinguished Professor of Chemistry and Biochemistry and Howard Hughes Medical Institute Investigator (also listed in §Nobel laureates)
Brent Dalrymple	PhD 1963	2003	"for his pioneering work in determining the geomagnetic polarity reversal timescale; a discovery that led to the theory of plate tectonics"	
George Dantzig	PhD 1946	1975	"for inventing linear programming and discovering methods that led to wide–scale scientific and technical applications to important problems in logistics, scheduling, and network optimization, and to the use of computers in making efficient use of the mathematical theory"	creator of the simplex algorithm; professor emeritus of Transportation Sciences and Professor of Operations Research and of Computer Science at Stanford University
Henry Eyring	Ph.D. 1927	1966	"for contributions to our understanding of the structure and properties of matter, especially for his creation of absolute rate theory, one of the sharpest tools in the study of rates of chemical reaction"	namesake of the Eyring equation; professor of Chemistry (Princeton University), dean of the University of Utah graduate school
Herbert S. Gutowsky	MS 1946	1976	"in recognition of pioneering studies in the field of nuclear magnetic resonance spectroscopy"	
Daniel E. Koshland Jr.	BA 1941	1990	"for profoundly influencing the understanding of how proteins function through his induced–fit model of enzyme actrion. His incisive analysis of bacterial chemotaxis has led to a deeper understanding of the molecular basis of memory and adaptation"	professor of biochemistry at UC Berkeley
Willis Lamb	BS 1934. PhD 1938	2000	"for his towering contributions to classical and quantum theories of laser radiation and quantum optics, and to the proper interpretation of quantum mechanics"	also listed in §Nobel laureates
Yuan T. Lee	PhD 1965	1986	"for his world leadership in the development of molecular beam techniques and their application to the study of chemical dynamics. His work has had an enormous impact on many areas of physical chemistry, especially building up a quantitative bridge between the laws of mechanics and complex macroscopic phenomena"	professor of Chemistry at UC Berkeley; also listed in §Nobel laureates
Tung-Yen Lin	M.S. 1933	1986	"for his work as an engineer, teacher and author whose scientific analyses, technological innovation, and visionary designs have spanned the gulf not only between science and art, but also between technology and society"	professor of Civil Engineering, bridge builder, pioneering researcher and practitioner of prestressed concrete, designed Moscone Center
Lynn Margulis	PhD 1963	1999	"for her outstanding contributions to understanding of the development, structure, and evolution of living things, for inspiring new research in the biological, climatological, geological and planetary sciences, and for her extraordinary abilities as a teacher and communicator of science to the public"	botanist known for endosymbiosis theory; Distinguished University Professor at the University of Massachusetts, Amherst; first wife of Carl Sagan
Elizabeth Neufeld	PhD 1956	1994	"for her contributions to the understanding of the lysosomal storage diseases, demonstrating the strong linkage between basic and applied scientific investigation"	researcher on the relationship of genetics to metabolic disease, professor and chair of biological chemistry at UCLA; also listed in §Wolf Prize)
Albert Overhauser	BS 1948, PhD 1951	1994	"for his fundamental contributions to understanding the physics of solids, to theoretical physics, and for the impact of his technological advances"	professor at Purdue University (1973–2011)
George C. Pimentel	Ph.D. 1949	1983	"for his varied and ingenious use of infrared spectroscopy to study chemical bonding and molecular dynamics, and for his discovery of the first chemically pumped laser, which has had strong scientific impact as well as practical applications"	inventor of the chemical laser; Director, Laboratory of Chemical Biodynamics at UC Berkeley; also listed in §Wolf Prize
Kenneth Pitzer	PhD 1937	1974	"for his pioneering application of statistical thermodynamics and spectroscopy to our understanding of the properties of organic and inorganic materials"	lecturer and professor (1935–1964 and 1971–1984) and dean (1951–1960) of the College of Chemistry at UC Berkeley
Peter H. Raven	BS 1957	2000	"For his contributions to the dynamics of plant systematics and evolution, the introduction of the concept of coevolution, and his major contribution to the international efforts to preserve biodiversity"	Director and Engelmann Professor of Botany at Missouri Botanical Garden at Washington University in St. Louis
Roger Revelle	PhD 1936	1990	"for his pioneering work in the areas of carbon dioxide and climate modification, oceanographic exploration presaging plate tectonics, and the biological effects of radiation in the marine environment, and studies of human population growth and global food supplies"	researcher of global warming theory; Director Emeritus Scripps Institution of Oceanography and Richard Saltonstall Professor of Population Policy Emeritus, Harvard University
Frederick Rossini	PhD 1928	1976	"for contributions to basic reference knowledge in chemical thermodynamics"	professor of chemical thermodynamics at Rice University
Glenn T. Seaborg	PhD 1937	1991	"for his outstanding work as a chemist, scientist and teacher in the field of nuclear chemistry"	also listed in §Nobel laureates
Susan Solomon	M.S. 1979, Ph.D. 1981	2000	"for key scientific insights in explaining the cause of the Antarctic Ozone hole and for advancing the understanding of the global ozone layer; for changing the direction of ozone research through her findings; and for exemplary service to worldwide public policy decisions and to the American public"	senior scientist, National Oceanic and Atmospheric Administration (NOAA)
Gabor A. Somorjai	Ph.D. 1960	2002	"honored as the world's leading authority in the development of modern surface science, having established the molecular foundation of many surface–based technologies"	professor of chemistry at University of California, Berkeley (1964–present); also listed in Wolf Prize section
Earl Reece Stadtman	BS 1942	1979	"for seminal contributions to understanding of the energy metabolism of anaerobic bacteria and for elucidation of major mechanisms whereby the rates of metabolic processes are finely matched to the requirements of the living cell"	chief of the Laboratory of Biochemistry at the National Institutes of Health
Peter J. Stang	Ph.D. 1966	2010	"for his creative contributions to the development of organic supramolecular chemistry and for his outstanding and unique record of public service"	professor of chemistry at the University of Utah
JoAnne Stubbe	PhD 1971	2008	"for her ground–breaking experiments establishing the mechanisms of ribonucleotide reductases, polyester synthases, and natural product DNA cleavers compelling demonstrations of the power of chemical investigations to solve problems in biology"	
Henry Taube	PhD 1940	1976	"in recognition of contributions to the understanding of reactivity and reaction mechanisms in inorganic chemistry"	also listed in §Nobel laureates
Harold Urey	PhD 1923	1964	"for outstanding contributions to our understanding of the origin and evolution of the solar system and the origin of life on Earth and for pioneering work in the application of isotopes to the determination of the temperatures of ancient oceans"	physical chemist on isotopes; also listed in §Nobel laureates
John Roy Whinnery	BS EE 1937 PhD 1948	1992	"for his research contributions to microwaves, lasers, and quantum electronics; for his excellence as a teacher and author; and for his extensive services to government and professional organizations"	lecturer and professor (1946–2007) and dean (1959–1963) of the EECS Department at UC Berkeley
Robert R. Wilson	BA 1936, PhD 1940	1973	for "unusual ingenuity in designing experiments to explore the fundamental particles of matter and in designing and constructing the machines to produce the particles, culminating in the world's most powerful particle accelerator";	recipient of the 1984 Enrico Fermi Award for "his outstanding contributions to physics and particle accelerator designs and construction. He was the creator and principal designer of the Fermi National Laboratory and what is, at present, the highest energy accelerator in the world. His contributions have always been characterized by the greatest ingenuity and innovation and accomplished with grace and style"
David J. Wineland	BS 1965, PhD 1970	2007	"for his leadership in developing the science of laser cooling and manipulation of ions, with applications in precise measurements and standards, quantum computing, and fundamental tests of quantum mechanics; his major impact on the international scientific community through the training of scientists; and his outstanding publications"	also listed in §Nobel laureates
Chien-Shiung Wu	PhD 1940	1975	"for her ingenious experiments that led to new and surprising understanding of the decay of the radioactive nucleus"	the "Chinese Madam Curie"
Shing-Tung Yau	Ph.D. 1971	1997	"for his fundamental contributions in mathematics and physics. Through his work, the understanding of basic geometric differential equations has been changed and he has expanded their role enormously within mathematics"	mathematician, recipient of the Fields Medal in 1982

== National Medal of Technology ==
Name	Degree(s)	Award year	National Medal of Technology citation	Additional notability
Frances H. Arnold	PhD 1985	2011	"for pioneering research on biofuels and chemicals that could lead to the replacement of pollution-generating materials"	also listed in §Nobel laureates
Glen Culler	BA Math 1951	1999	"for pioneering innovations in multiple branches of computing, including early efforts in digital speech processing, invention of the first on–line system for interactive graphical mathematics computing and pioneering work on the ARPAnet"	
Doug Engelbart	B. Eng. 1952, Ph.D. 1965	2000	"for creating the foundations of personal computing including continuous, real–time interaction based on cathode–ray tube displays and the mouse, hypertext linking, text editing, on–line journals, shared–screen teleconferencing, and remote collaborative work. More than any other person, he created the personal computing component of the computer revolution"	also listed in §Turing Award laureates
Arthur Gossard	PhD	2014	"for innovation, development, and application of artificially structured quantum materials critical to ultrahigh performance semiconductor device technology used in today's digital infrastructure"	
Chenming Hu	MS 1970, PhD 1973	2014	"for pioneering innovations in microelectronics including reliability technologies, the first industry–standard model for circuit design, and the first 3–dimensional transistors, which radically advanced semiconductor technology"	professor emeritus of EECS at UC Berkeley co-founder and chairman of Celestry Design Technologies (acquired by Cadence Design Systems for over $100 million); 2013 Phil Kaufman Award laureate
Gordon Moore	B.S. 1950	1990	"for his seminal leadership in bringing American industry the two major postwar innovations in microelectronics – large–scale integrated memory and the microprocessor – that have fueled the information revolution"	co-founder of NASDAQ–100 company Intel, namesake and originator of Moore's Law; co-founder of NASDAQ–100 semiconductor manufacturing company Intel
Ken Thompson	B.S. EE 1965, M.S. EE 1966	1998	for the "invention of the UNIX® operating system and the C programming language, which together have led to enormous growth of an entire industry, thereby enhancing American leadership in the Information Age"	co-creator of the Unix operating system; also listed in §Turing Award laureates
Steve Wozniak	(class of 1976, BS EECS 1986)	1985	for the "development and introduction of the personal computer which has sparked the birth of a new industry extending the power of the computer to individual users"	co-founder of NASDAQ–100 computer manufacturing company Apple Inc.; also listed in §Founders and co-founders

== Breakthrough Prize ==
Name	Degree(s)	Award year	Award field	Breakthrough Prize citation	Additional notability
Nima Arkani-Hamed	PhD 1997	2012	Physics	"for original approaches to outstanding problems in particle physics, including the proposal of large extra dimensions, new theories for the Higgs boson, novel realizations of supersymmetry, theories for dark matter, and the exploration of new mathematical structures in gauge theory scattering amplitudes"	theoretical physicist, faculty member of the Institute for Advance Study (Princeton, New Jersey), director of the Center For Future High Energy Physics in Beijing, China; professor (1999–2001) at UC Berkeley
David Baker	PhD 1989	2021	Life Sciences	"for developing a technology that allowed the design of proteins never seen before in nature, including novel proteins that have the potential for therapeutic intervention in human diseases"	biochemist, head of the Institute for Protein Design, professor of biochemistry at the University of Washington
Harry F. Noller	BS 1960 Biochemistry	2017	Life Sciences	"for discovering the centrality of RNA in forming the active centers of the ribosome, the fundamental machinery of protein synthesis in all cells, thereby connecting modern biology to the origin of life and also explaining how many natural antibiotics disrupt protein synthesis"	biochemist, director of the Center for the Molecular Biology of RNA at the University of California, Santa Cruz
Saul Perlmutter	PhD Physics 1986	2015	Physics	"for the most unexpected discovery that the expansion of the Universe is accelerating, rather than slowing as had been long assumed"	also listed in §Nobel laureates
Joseph Polchinski	PhD 1980	2017	Physics	"for transformative advances in quantum field theory, string theory, and quantum gravity"	
Gary Ruvkun	BA Biophysics 1971	2015	Life Sciences	"for discovering a new world of genetic regulation by microRNAs, a class of tiny RNA molecules that inhibit translation or destabilize complementary mRNA targets"	also listed in §Wolf Prize
Andrew Strominger	MA 1979	2012	Physics	"for transformative advances in quantum field theory, string theory, and quantum gravity"	

== Gödel Prize ==
Name	Degree(s)	Award year	Gödel Prize citation	Additional notability
Sanjeev Arora	Ph.D. 1994	2001	"for the PCP theorem and its applications to hardness of approximation"	professor of computer science at Princeton University
Sanjeev Arora	Ph.D. 1994	2010	for the "discovery of a polynomial–time approximation scheme (PTAS) for the Euclidean Travelling Salesman Problem (ETSP)")	professor of computer science at Princeton University
Ronald Fagin	PhD Math 1973	2014	"for Optimal Aggregation Algorithms for Middleware"	IBM Fellow at IBM Research–Almaden
Matthew K. Franklin	MA Math 1985	2013	"established the field of pairing–based cryptography by supplying a precise definition of the security of this approach, and providing compelling new applications for it"	professor of computer science at UC Davis
Shafi Goldwasser	MS 1981, Ph.D. 1983	1993	"for the development of interactive proof systems"	RSA Professor of electrical engineering and computer science at MIT, professor of mathematical sciences at the Weizmann Institute of Science; also listed in Turing Award laureates section
Shafi Goldwasser	MS 1981, Ph.D. 1983	2001	"for the PCP theorem and its applications to hardness of approximation"	RSA Professor of electrical engineering and computer science at MIT, professor of mathematical sciences at the Weizmann Institute of Science; also listed in Turing Award laureates section
Silvio Micali	Ph.D. 1982	1993	"for the development of interactive proof systems"	also listed in Turing Award laureates section
Rajeev Motwani	Ph.D. 1988	2001	"for the PCP theorem and its applications to hardness of approximation"	former professor of computer science at Stanford University; co–author of a research paper on the PageRank algorithm (with Larry Page, Sergey Brin, and Terry Winograd) which became the basis of Google
Moni Naor	PhD 1989 CS	2014	for Optimal Aggregation Algorithms for Middleware	professor of computer science at the Weizmann Institute of Science (in Israel)
Noam Nisan	PhD 1988	2014	for laying the foundations of algorithmic game theory	
Madhu Sudan	Ph.D. 1992	2001	"for the PCP theorem and its applications to hardness of approximation"	professor of computer science at MIT

== MacArthur Fellowship ==
The MacArthur Fellowship is also known as the "Genius Grant" or "Genius Award".

Name	Degree(s)	Award year	Additional notability
Joan Abrahamson	J.D.	1985	president of the Jefferson Institute (a public policy think-tank)
Patrick Awuah	M.B.A. 1999	2015	founder of Ashesi University in Ghana
**Carolyn Bertozzi**	Ph.D. 1993	1999	T.Z. and Irmgard Chu Distinguished Professor of Chemistry at UC Berkeley
**Peter J. Bickel**	Ph.D. 1963	1984	professor of statistics at UC Berkeley
Tami Bond	M.S. 1995	2014	environmental engineer; professor in Department of Civil and Environmental Engineering at the University of Illinois at Urbana–Champaign
Jennifer Carlson	M.A. 2008, Ph.D. 2013	2022	sociologist, associate professor at the University of Arizona
Shawn Carlson	B.S. 1981	1999	co-founder of Society for Amateur Scientists, former columnist of "The Amateur Scientist" in Scientific American; "Head Cheese" of the LabRats Science Education Project (a "Boy Scouts" for young scientists)
John Carlstrom	Ph.D. 1988	1998	professor of astrophysics at the University of Chicago
Stanley Cavell	B.A. 1947	1992	philosopher, Walter M. Cabot Professor Emeritus at Harvard University
Sandy Close	B.A. 1964	1995	journalist, executive director of the Bay Area Institute/Pacific News Service and New America Media
Eric Coleman	Master of Public Health 1991	2012	geriatrician, professor at the University of Colorado School of Medicine
Maria Crawford	Ph.D. 1964	1993	professor emeritus of geology at Bryn Mawr College
William Dichtel	Ph.D. Chemistry 2005	2015	professor of chemistry and chemical biology at Cornell University; pioneer of covalent organic frameworks
Corinne Dufka	M.A. social welfare 1984	2003	human rights investigator, senior researcher in the Africa Division of Human Rights Watch
Michael Elowitz	B.A. physics 1992	2007	molecular biologist, professor at the California Institute of Technology; creator of the repressilator (artificial genetic circuit in synthetic biology)
**Jon H. Else**	B.A. 1968	1988	Prix Italia recipient (The Day After Trinity), recipient of four Emmy Awards, nominated twice for the Academy Award, 1999 winner of the Sundance Film Festival Filmmaker's Trophy, cinematographer on the Academy Award–winning Who Are the DeBolts? And Where Did They Get Nineteen Kids?, professor of journalism at UC Berkeley (also listed in Emmy Awards section)
Sharon Emerson	B.A. 1966	1995	research professor emeritus at the University of Utah
Deborah Estrin	BS EECS 1980	2018	associate dean and professor of computer science at Cornell University; pioneer in computer network routing
P. Gabrielle Foreman	Ph.D. 1992	2022	Paterno Family Professor of American Literature and professor of African American Studies and History at Pennsylvania State University
Danna Freedman	Ph.D. 2009	2022	Frederick George Keyes Professor of Chemistry at the Massachusetts Institute of Technology
Daniel Friedan	Ph.D. 1980	1987	physicist in string theory and condensed matter physics, professor of physics at Rutgers University
Margaret J. Geller	B.A. physics 1970	1990	astrophysicist at the Harvard–Smithsonian Center for Astrophysics
Peter Gleick	M.S., Ph.D. hydro–climatology	2003	co-founder of the Pacific Institute, researcher on fresh water resources
David B. Goldstein	Ph.D. physics	2002	energy conservation specialist, co–director of the Energy Program at the Natural Resources Defense Council
Linda Griffith	Ph.D. 1988	2006	professor of bioengineering at MIT
David Gross	Ph.D. physics 1966	1987	Nobel laureate (Physics, 2004) (also listed in Nobel laureates section)
**Eva Harris**	Ph.D. 1993	1997	professor in the School of Public Health at the University of California, Berkeley; researcher of dengue fever
David Hawkins	Ph.D. 1940	1981	professor, Manhattan Project researcher, known for his proof, along with Herbert A. Simon, of the Hawkins-Simons theorem
Peter J. Hayes	Ph.D. 1989	2000	energy policy activist, executive director of the Nautilus Institute for Security and Sustainability
**Walter Hood**	M.Arch., M.L.A. 1989	2019	professor, former chair of Landscape Architecture, College of Environmental Design, University of California, Berkeley
Vijay Iyer	Ph.D. 1998	2013	jazz pianist and composer
Daniel Hunt Janzen	Ph.D. 1965	1989	ecologist and conservationist; professor of biology at the University of Pennsylvania, technical advisor for restoration project Area de Conservación Guanacaste World Heritage Site in Costa Rica
Thomas C. Joe	B.A. 1958, M.A. 1961	1986	social policy analyst, special assistant to Department of Health, Education, and Welfare (1969–73), advisor to White House Domestic Policy Council (1975–79), member of National Council of the Handicapped (1982)
Daniel Jurafsky	B.A. 1983, Ph.D. 1992	2002	computer scientist and linguist; professor of linguistics and computer science at the University of Colorado, Boulder
Peter Kenmore	Ph.D. 1980	1994	entomologist and member of the Food and Agriculture Organization of the United Nations
Nancy Kopell	M.A., Ph.D. 1967	1990	mathematician, William Fairfield Warren Distinguished Professor at Boston University, co-director of the Center for Computational Neuroscience and Neural Technology
Priti Krishtel	B.A. 1999	2022	lawyer, co-founder and co-executive director of the Initiative for Medicines, Access, and Knowledge
Josh Kun	Ph.D. 1999	2016	musicologist
Michael C. Malin	B.A. (physics) 1967	1987	astronomer, principal investigator for the camera on Mars Global Surveyor, founder and CEO of Malin Space Science Systems, recipient of a NASA Exceptional Scientific Achievement Medal in 2002, recipient of the 2005 Carl Sagan Memorial Award
Yoky Matsuoka	B.S. 1993	2007	neuro-robotics researcher, vice president of Technology at Tony Fadell "smart–thermostat" company Nest Labs when it was acquired by Google for $3.2 billion; founding member of Google X
Joshua Miele	B.A. 1992, Ph.D. 2003	2021	adaptive technology designer at Amazon Lab126
David R. Montgomery	Ph.D. 1991	2008	geomorphologist, professor of Earth and Space Science at the University of Washington, Seattle; researcher on the role of topsoil in human civilization, recipient of the 2008 Washington State Book Award in General Nonfiction for Dirt: The Erosion of Civilizations
Fred Moten	M.A., Ph.D.	2020	cultural theorist, poet, professor of Performance Studies at New York University and Distinguished Professor Emeritus at University of California, Riverside
**Richard A. Muller**	Ph.D.	1982	professor of Physics at UC Berkeley, senior scientist at Lawrence Berkeley National Laboratory
Cecilia Muñoz	M.A. 1986	2000	civil rights and immigration activist; director of the United States Domestic Policy Council (2012–present)
Margaret Murnane	Ph.D. 1989	2000	professor of physics at the University of Colorado, Boulder, specialist in pulsed–operation lasers
Viet Thanh Nguyen	B.A. 1992, Ph.D. 1997	2017	author (also listed in §Pulitzer Prize)
John Novembre	Ph.D. 2006	2015	computational biologist and professor of human genetics at the University of Chicago
Trevor Paglen	B.A. 1998, Ph.D. 2008	2017	artist, author, and geographer specializing in mass surveillance and data collection
**Margie Profet**	B.A. physics 1985	1993	researcher in evolutionary biology
Peter H. Raven	B.S. 1957	1985	botanist and environmentalist, President Emeritus of the Missouri Botanical Garden (also listed in National Medal of Science)
Ed Roberts	B.A. 1964, M.A. 1966	1984	activist in the disability rights movement (Independent Living)
**Julia Hall Bowman Robinson**	B.A. mathematics 1940, Ph.D. 1948	1983	professor (1976–1985) of mathematics at UC Berkeley, specializing in Hilbert's Tenth Problem; first woman president of the American Mathematical Society; namesake of the Julia Robinson Mathematics Festival of the Mathematical Sciences Research Institute
Jay Rubenstein	Ph.D. 1997	2007	medieval historian, professor of history at the University of Tennessee, Knoxville
Daniel P. Schrag	Ph.D. 1993	2000	Sturgis Hooper Professor of Geology at Harvard University
John Henry Schwarz	Ph.D. 1966	1987	the "Schwarz" in the "Green–Schwarz mechanism" that started the first superstring revolution in superstring theory, Harold Brown Professor of Theoretical Physics at Caltech
Yuval Sharon	B.A. 2001	2017	opera director and producer
**Allan Sly**	PhD 2009 Statistics	2018	faculty member at the Department of Statistics at UC Berkeley (2011–2016); current professor of mathematics at Princeton University
**Dawn Song**	Ph.D. 2002	2010	professor in EECS at UC Berkeley specializing in computer security
**Claire Tomlin**	Ph.D. 1998	2006	researcher in unmanned aerial vehicles, air traffic control, and modeling of biological processes; professor in the Department of Aeronautics and Astronautics and the Department of Electrical Engineering, at Stanford University, where she is director of the Hybrid Systems Laboratory; professor in the Department of Electrical Engineering and Computer Science at University of California, Berkeley
Gary Alfred Tomlinson	Ph.D. 1979	1988	musicologist and cultural theorist, professor at Yale University, former Walter H. Annenberg Professor of Humanities at the University of Pennsylvania
Philip Treisman	Ph.D. 1985	1992	professor of Mathematics at the University of Texas, Austin; pioneer in the Emerging Scholars Program
Bret Wallach	B.A. 1964, M.A. 1966, Ph.D. in 1968	1984	cultural geographer, professor at the University of Oklahoma
Robert Penn Warren	M.A. 1927	1981	novelist and poet, three–time recipient of the Pulitzer Prize (also listed in Pulitzer Prize section)
Robert H. Williams	Ph.D. 1967	1993	physicist, senior research scientist at the Princeton Environmental Institute at Princeton University
**Allan Wilson**	Ph.D. 1961	1986	professor (1972–1991) of Biochemistry at UC Berkeley specializing in molecular approaches to understand biological evolution and to reconstruct phylogenies
Jay Wright	B.A. 1961	1986	poet
Gene Luen Yang	BS CS 1995	2016	cartoonist and graphic novelist; fifth National Ambassador for Young People's Literature
Shing–Tung Yau	Ph.D. 1971	1984	mathematician (listed under Fields Medal section)
Xiaowei Zhuang	MS 1993, Ph.D. 1996	2003	biophysicist, professor of chemistry and chemical biology at Harvard University

== Religion, spirituality, and lifestyle ==
- Isaac Bonewits, B.A. Magic 1970 – neopagan author, priest, speaker and founder of contemporary druidic group Ár nDraíocht Féin
- Diana Ming Chan, B.A. – social worker
- Pema Chodron, B.A. – spiritual teacher and author, interpreter of Tibetan Buddhism for Western audiences; formerly known as Deirdre Blomfield–Brown
- Mayme Agnew Clayton, B.A. – librarian; founder, president, and spiritual leader of the Western States Black Research and Education Center (WSBREC), the largest privately held collection of African–American historical materials in the world
- Minh Dang, B.A. 2006 in Sociology, M.A. 2013 Social Welfare – independent consultant and advocate on matters of human trafficking and social justice
- Adelle Davis, B.A. – nutritionist, author
- Madelyn Dunham – grandmother of Barack Obama (did not graduate)
- Barry Kerzin, B.A. 1972 – professor of medicine, Buddhist monk and teacher, and personal physician to the Dalai Lama
- Timothy Leary, Ph.D. 1950 – psychologist and counterculture figure
- Brittany Maynard, BA – activist for death with dignity
- Terence McKenna, B.Sc. 1969 – modern philosopher, author of the novelty theory and "stoned ape" hypothesis
- Franklin Rhoda, B.Sc. 1872 – activist for Chinese civil rights in the 1870s; founded "Church of the New Age" and San Francisco's "Underground Mission"; surveyed uncharted parts of Rocky Mountains
- Ed Roberts, B.A. 1964, M.A. 1966, C.Phil. 1969 – founder of the Independent Living Movement
- Seraphim Rose, M.A. 1961 – Eastern Orthodox author and monk, founder of the Saint Herman of Alaska Monastery
- Kartar Singh Sarabha – Indian revolutionary
- Heng Sure, Ph.D. 1974 – American Buddhist monk of the City of Ten Thousand Buddhas; one of the first Americans ordained in the States

== Fictional ==
- In the teen drama web series 13 Reasons Why Season 4 (2020), Jessica Davis (played by Alisha Boe) goes to UC Berkeley. Alex Standal (played by Miles Heizer) also receives an acceptance letter from UC Berkeley.
- In the 2018 film A Simple Favor, Henry Golding's character, Sean Townsend, goes on to teach at UC Berkeley at the end of the film.
- In the 2018 film Venom, Emilio Rivera's character, plays Lobby Guard Richard, whose daughter is said to have received acceptances to UC Berkeley, Cornell, and MIT.
- In the 2018 film Ant-Man and the Wasp, Laurence Fishburne's character, Dr. Bill Foster, teaches quantum physics at UC Berkeley.
- In the 2017 film Lady Bird, Lady Bird's brother, Miguel McPherson, majored in math at UC Berkeley.
- In the show Archer, Season 6 Episode 8: The Kanes, Lana and Archer travel to Berkeley so that her parents can meet their granddaughter. Lana's mother Claudette is a professor of public policy with a focus on feminist issues at UC Berkeley.
- In the TV series Mad Men, Don's niece Stephanie (played by Caity Lotz) is a Berkeley student and later drop-out during the 1960s.
- In the 1969 Paul Mazursky film Bob & Carol & Ted & Alice, Bob claims to his wife that the young woman on whom he cheated with her is not dumb and just received her master's degree from UC Berkeley at age 20.
- In Michael Crichton's Jurassic Park and The Lost World, Ian Malcom, a mathematician, is the Board Director of Mathematics at the University of California Berkeley.
- In the 2014 film Transcendence, Johnny Depp's character, Dr. Will Custer, and Rebecca Hall's character, Evelyn Caster, both live in Berkeley and run a lab at the Lawrence Livermore National Laboratory.
- In House of Lies, season 2 episode 2, it is mentioned that Marty, played by Don Cheadle, and Tamara, played by Nia Long, were both classmates at Berkeley. Dawn Olivieri's character Monica is also mentioned as having attended at the same time.
- In the 2012 film Savages, Aaron Taylor–Johnson's character, Ben, is mentioned as having graduated from Berkeley.
- In the 2012 film 21 Jump Street, Dave Franco's character, Eric, is mentioned as having been accepted to Berkeley, and plans to attend.
- In the episode "The Return of Wonder Woman" (Wonder Woman Season 2 pilot), Diana Prince pretends to be a UC Berkeley graduate.
- In the 2011 film Rise of the Planet of the Apes, James Franco's character, Will Rodman, is seen wearing a Berkeley t–shirt, implying that he attended the school in some capacity. There are also University of California diplomas on his wall.
- In 2001's Season 1 Episode 6 of the television series The Newsroom, character Sloan Sabbith is revealed to be an alumna of UC Berkeley.
- In the 2008 film High School Musical 3: Senior Year, Troy Bolton, played by Zac Efron, announces that he has chosen to attend UC Berkeley after graduation. His father is seen wearing a Cal hat at graduation.
- In House, Lawrence Kutner played by Kal Penn, received a full scholarship to the University of California at Berkeley and graduated magna cum laude with a degree in Physics.
- In the 2003 film Mona Lisa Smile, Julia Roberts' character is an idealistic Berkeley graduate.
- In the 1994 film Stargate, James Spader's character is revealed to have a University of California diploma when Dr. Catherine Langford is reviewing his credentials.
- In the 1992 film Basic Instinct, Dr. Beth Garner, played by Jeanne Tripplehorn received her Ph.D. in Psychology at Berkeley. Catherine Tramell, played by Sharon Stone, also received her B.A. in Psychology and Literature at Berkeley.
- In the Back to the Future trilogy, inventor of the Delorean time machine, Dr. Emmett Brown, attended Berkeley, stated by trilogy director Robert Zemeckis. In the original story line for Back to the Future 2, Biff would have gone to 1967 and George McFly would be teaching at Berkeley.
- Sandy Cohen from The O.C. graduated from Boalt School of Law at Berkeley. His wife, Kirsten Cohen has an Art History degree from Berkeley as well. Their adopted son Ryan Atwood then went on to complete a degree in architecture there.
- In the comic strip Doonesbury Joanie Caucus was accepted to and graduated from the Boalt School of Law in the 1970s.
- Press Secretary and later Presidential Chief of Staff C. J. Cregg, played by Allison Janney on the long–running The West Wing, got her master's degree from Berkeley.
- In the television series Grey's Anatomy, Sandra Oh's character, Dr. Cristina Yang, often boasts of having a Ph.D. from Berkeley, along with a college degree from Smith and a medical degree from Stanford.
- In the situation comedy Hangin' with Mr. Cooper, Mark Cooper Mark Curry has a Cal Berkeley banner in his room.
- Berkeley is the setting for the film Boys and Girls starring Freddie Prinze, Jr. and Claire Forlani, who both play Berkeley students.
- The 2002 film Catch Me If You Can tells the true story of Frank Abagnale who faked getting his law degree from Berkeley to impress his fiance's father and to get a job as a lawyer. The character was played by Leonardo DiCaprio.
- The Hulk, directed by Ang Lee, largely takes place at the Lawrence Berkeley National Laboratory and private research facilities nearby. Eric Bana and Jennifer Connelly played researchers.
- Jack Bauer, the lead character played by Kiefer Sutherland in the hit drama 24, got his Masters of Science in "Criminology and Law" at Berkeley (no such degree is offered).
- In the hit film Field of Dreams (1990), the lead character Ray Kinsella (played by Kevin Costner) is a Berkeley alum
- Rei Shimura, the protagonist in Sujata Massey's mystery novels, earned her master's degree in Japanese art history from Berkeley.
- In the film Gotcha! (1985), Jonathan (played by Anthony Edwards) falls for Sasha (played by Linda Fiorentino), a beautiful and mysterious Berkeley graduate student in film.
- Winona Ryder plays Finn Dodd, a Berkeley graduate student, in the 1995 film How to Make an American Quilt.
- In the 2001 film The Wedding Planner, Matthew McConaughey's character and Bridgette Wilson's character were claimed to have met as students at UC Berkeley.
- In USA Network's television series Monk, the title character, Adrian Monk, played by Tony Shalhoub, graduated from Berkeley (mentioned in the episode "Mr. Monk and the Other Detective", Season 4 & "Mr. Monk and the Class Reunion", Season 5).
- Associate White House Counsel, Joe Quincy, played by Matthew Perry on The West Wing, earned his MBA and JD from Berkeley.
- In the situation comedy 3rd Rock from the Sun, Dick Solomon's (John Lithgow) love interest, Dr. Mary Albright (Jane Curtin), received her bachelor's degree from Berkeley
- In the 1988 film Die Hard (1988), Joseph Yashinobo Takagi (James Shigeta), President of Nakatomi Trading, is said to be a scholarship student at UC Berkeley, graduating in 1955.
- In the film Legally Blonde (2001), Harvard law student Enid Wexler earns a Ph.D. at UC Berkeley in women's studies, "emphasis in the history of combat".
- In the television series CSI: Crime Scene Investigation, Sara Sidle received her master's degree from UC Berkeley.
- The film Junior (1994), starring Arnold Schwarzenegger and Danny DeVito, was filmed on the Berkeley campus.
- In the film Deep Impact (1998), starring Morgan Freeman and Téa Leoni, research on meteors is done on a Berkeley website.
- In the film Peaceful Warrior (2006), starring Scott Mechlowicz and Nick Nolte, the main character is a member of the male gymnastics team at UC Berkeley. The semi–autobiographical movie is based on the book Way of the Peaceful Warrior (1981), which was authored by real–life UC Berkeley alumnus Dan Millman.
- In the film Fathers' Day, Dale Putley (Robin Williams), Jack Lawrence (Billy Crystal), and Collette Andrews (Nastassja Kinski) all were students at Berkeley. We could probably assume that Jack ended up getting his law degree there.
- In Family Ties, Steven Keaton and Elyse Keaton met at Berkeley as undergraduates. It can be assumed that Elyse got her architectural degree and Steve got his degree in political science, communications, or filmmaking. Mallory Keaton was born there on the day Steve was supposed to take a political science examination.
- In Full House, D.J. Tanner accepts an admissions offer from Berkeley.
- In The Graduate Elaine Robinson was a student at Berkeley.
- In Single Asian Female main character Jennie Low and several other characters are students at the school.
- In the Japanese manga series Hana–Kimi, Izumi Sano became a student at the college.
- In the film Star Trek IV: The Voyage Home (1986), Captain Kirk claims that Spock went to Berkeley in the 1960s, where he "did too much LDS [sic]." However, Kirk merely invents this story to explain Spock's strange appearance and behavior. Spock actually went to Starfleet Academy, which is also located in the San Francisco Bay Area.
- In the film The Princess Diaries 2: Royal Engagement, Princess Mia's friend Lilly Moscovitz (Heather Matarazzo) claims to be a Berkeley graduate student. Actor Chris Pine, who played the male protagonist Lord Nicholas Devereaux in the movie, graduated with a bachelor's degree from Berkeley.
- In the film Magnolia (1999), Tom Cruise's seduction–guru character claims to have attended psychology classes at Berkeley.
- One of the central protagonists in Mischa Berlinski's novel Fieldwork (2007), Martiya van der Leun, is a Berkeley graduate student in anthropology.
- Marissa Cooper and Ryan Atwood frnom The OC are supposed to attend UC Berkeley before the car crash that kills her.
- In The Sopranos, Meadow Soprano (Jamie–Lynn Sigler) has her heart set on UC Berkeley against the wishes of her parents due to distance. Carmela Soprano throws away an admissions letter, that she later retrieves out of guilt, requesting transcripts.
- In Alias, Sydney Bristow’s ex–lover, Agent Noah Hicks (Peter Berg), says he was recruited out of Berkeley by SD–6.
- Large portions of the feature film Who'll Stop the Rain, starring Nick Nolte and Tuesday Weld, were filmed in the south campus area.
- In the book Snow Crash, both Hiro Protagonist and Juanita Marquez attended Berkeley.
- In Season 3 of the television series Weeds, Nancy Botwin mentions spending two and half years at Berkeley.
- In the movie A Perfect Murder, Viggo Mortensen's character claims to have studied art at Berkeley.
- In the series finale of Dollhouse, Mag, played by Felicia Day, says that prior to tech going wild, she studied sociology at Berkeley.
- Charmed protagonist Paige Matthews attended Berkeley to earn a degree in social work; Season 4 episode "A Paige from the Past" revealed that she was accepted into Berkeley partially due to a well–written essay on the subject of her adoptive parents' death.
- Percy Jackson protagonist, Annabeth Chase, is going to attend the UC Berkeley College of Environmental Design after finishing her senior year of high school, revealed in Magnus Chase And The Gods Of Asgard: The Ship Of The Dead.
- In the season 3 finale of Unbreakable Kimmy Schmidt, Kimmy refers to UC Bark-ley, a dog pun for UC Berkeley.
- In the finale of Hannah Montana, Miley says she is driving from Malibu to Stanford. The building shown is actually the Valley of Life Sciences Building (VLSB) on the Berkeley campus.
- In the TV show Quantico, Oakland native Alex Parrish (played by Priyanka Chopra) has a stuffed bear wearing a UC Berkeley sweatshirt, suggesting that she may have attended the school before joining Quantico. Caleb Haas, a fellow Quantico trainee, enrolls at the Berkeley Law School after becoming an FBI agent.
- In the TV show Monk, Adrian Monk is a graduate of UC Berkeley.
- At the end of the movie Midnight Sun, Charlie Reed is leaving to UC Berkeley.
- A degree from Cal-Berkeley can be seen in Tara Knowles' office on the television series Sons of Anarchy.
- Charlie Salinger dropped out of Berkeley during his sophomore year in Party of Five.

== See also ==
- List of University of California, Berkeley faculty
- List of University of California, Berkeley alumni in business and entrepreneurship
- List of University of California, Berkeley alumni in science and technology
