= List of public art in Leicestershire =

This is a list of public art in the English county of Leicestershire. This list applies only to works of public art on permanent display in an outdoor public space. For example, this does not include artworks in museums.

== City of Leicester ==
Image	Title / subject	Location and coordinates	Date	Artist / designer	Type	Material	Dimensions	Designation	Owner / administrator	Wikidata	Notes
More images	John Manners, 5th Duke of Rutland	Leicester Market 52.634726°N 1.133208°W	1851	Edward Davis	Statue	Bronze	h 278 centimetres (109 inches)	Grade II	Leicester City Council		Due to be relocated following completion of building work
More images	The Leicester Seamstress	Hotel Street, Leicester 52.633865°N 1.134325°W	1990	James Walter Butler	Statue	Bronze	h 124 centimetres (49 inches); w 106 centimetres (42 inches); d 60 centimetres (24 inches)		Leicester City Council		
More images	Thomas Cook	London Road, Leicester 52.630884°N 1.125286°W	1994	James Walter Butler	Statue	Bronze	h 180 centimetres (71 inches); w 84 centimetres (33 inches); d 79 centimetres (31 inches)		Leicester City Council		
More images	Richard III	Cathedral Gardens, Leicester 52.634311°N 1.136687°W	1988	James Walter Butler	Statue	Bronze	h 183 centimetres (72 inches)		Leicester City Council		Formerly in Castle Gardens, Leicester.
	Towards Stillness	King Richard III Visitor Centre Gardens, Leicester 52.634478°N 1.137530°W	2014	Dallas Pierce Quintero		Steel plates					
	Textile Process	Bath Lane, Leicester 52.633989°N 1.142302°W	2011	Sculpture Works	Sculpture	Corten steel and stainless steel			Leicester City Council		
	Mermaids	West Bridge, Leicester 52.633958°N 1.142924°W	1900	William J Neatby	Sculpture	Terracotta and brick			Leicester City Council		Formerly archway at Leicester Wholesale Market. Re-erected at West Bridge, 1980.
	Beacons	St Peters Square, Highcross Shopping Centre, Leicester 52.636618°N 1.138492°W	2016	Levitate	Interactive digital light sculpture	Digital screens	h 7 metres (23 feet)		Highcross Shopping Centre		
	Sporting Success	Gallowtree Gate/Humberstone Road, Leicester 52.635961°N 1.132745°W	1998	Martin Williams	Statue	Bronze	h 172 centimetres (68 inches)		Leicester City Council		
	Metal Tree	Haymarket, Leicester 52.637321°N 1.132297°W	1974	Hubert Dalwood		Stainless steel	h 404 centimetres (159 inches); w 320 centimetres (130 inches); d 239 centimetres (94 inches)		Leicester City Council		
	The Lion Fountain	Town Hall Square, Leicester 52.633665°N 1.132192°W	1879	Francis J Hames	Fountain	Bronze-painted cast iron and granite	h 716 centimetres (282 inches)	Grade II	Leicester City Council		
	Boer War Memorial	Town Hall Square, Leicester 52.634004°N 1.132372°W	1909	Joseph Crosland McClure	Sculpture	Bronze and granite		Grade II	Leicester City Council		
	Statue of Alice Hawkins	Market Square, Leicester 52.634397°N 1.133775°W	2018	Sean Hedges-Quinn	Statue	Bronze and granite	h 210 centimetres (83 inches)		Leicester City Council		
	Wyvern	193 Charles Street, Leicester 52.63293°N 1.12675°W	1938	Percy Brown	Statue	Sandstone	h 150 centimetres (5 feet)				
	John Biggs	Welford Place, Leicester 52.631809°N 1.133702°W	1873	George Anderson Lawson	Statue	Originally marble, but recast in bronze in 1930	h 213 centimetres (84 inches)	Grade II	Leicester City Council		
	The Clicker	New Walk, Leicester 52.629824°N 1.129232°W	2007	John Atkin	Statue	Bronze			The Friends of New Walk		
	The Clothier	New Walk, Leicester 52.628903°N 1.126441°W	2010	John Atkin	Statue	Marble			The Friends of New Walk		
	Revd Robert Hall	De Montfort Square, Leicester 52.628150°N 1.125094°W	1871	John Birnie Philip	Statue	Sicilian marble	h 274 centimetres (108 inches)	Grade II	Leicester City Council		
	Vortex	Henry Wellcombe Building, Lancaster Road, Leicester 52.624157°N 1.126116°W	1999	John Sydney Carter	Sculpture	Cast Aluminium	h 18 ft		University of Leicester		
	Concerto	De Montfort Hall, Leicester 52.624840°N 1.121335°W	2010	John Sydney Carter	Sculpture	Stainless steel			Leicester City Council		
	Sikh Soldier Memorial	De Montfort Hall, Leicester 52.624878°N 1.120665°W	2022	Taranjit Singh	Sculpture	Bronze			Leicester City Council		
	Souls	University of Leicester 52.620935°N 1.126161°W	1990	Helaine Blumenfeld	Sculpture	Bronze	h 280 centimetres (110 inches)		University of Leicester		
	Flight	University of Leicester 52.620632°N 1.124295°W	2014	Helaine Blumenfeld	Sculpture	Bronze	h 320 cm; w 110 centimetres (43 inches); d 110 cm		University of Leicester		
	Eye of Time	University of Leicester 52.621619°N 1.124423°W	2006	Allan Mills	Sculpture	Portland stone			University of Leicester		
	Life	University of Leicester 52.622538°N 1.124011°W		Percy Brown	Sculpture	Bronze			University of Leicester		
	Vortex	University of Leicester 52.624155°N 1.126133°W	2005	John Sydney Carter	Sculpture	Aluminium			University of Leicester		
	Diversity in Harmony	University of Leicester 52.625960°N 1.121376°W	1990	Naomi Blake	Sculpture	Bronze resin			University of Leicester		
	Statue of Liberty	Upperton Road, Leicester 52.625817°N 1.143607°W	1922	J H Morcom	Statue	Reinforced cement	h 5.18 metres (17.0 feet)				Formerly on Liberty Shoe Factory, Eastern Boulevard.
	Sculptural Gateway	Belgrave Road, Leicester 52.644811°N 1.126498°W	2023	Anuradha Patel	Sculpture	Galvanised Steel	h 4.6 metres (15 feet)		Leicester City Council		
	Mahatma Gandhi	Belgrave Road, Leicester 52.647129°N 1.124387°W	2009	Gautam Pal	Statue	Bronze					
	Medieval Plough Team	Towers Park, Langford Way, Leicester 52.649610°N 1.093732°W	2012	Andrew McKeown	Sculpture	Corten steel	l 5.8 metres (19 feet); h 2.5 metres (8.2 feet)		Leicester City Council		Installed 2018.
	Cardinal Wolsey	Abbey Park, Leicester 52.646981°N 1.137414°W	1920	J H Morcom	Sculpture	York Stone	h 2.75 metres (9 feet)		Leicester City Council		Originally in King Street offices of Wolsey Ltd.
	Spaceman	National Space Centre, Exploration Drive, Leicester 52.654366°N 1.131984°W		Aden Hynes	Sculpture	Fibreglass			Leicester City Council		
	St Aidan and King Oswald	St Aidan's Church, St Oswalds Road, Leicester 52.645888°N 1.179734°W		William Gordon	Mural	Ceramic tiles			Church of England		

== Blaby district ==
Image	Title / subject	Location and coordinates	Date	Artist / designer	Type	Material	Dimensions	Designation	Owner / administrator	Wikidata	Notes
	Abstract Relief	East wall, County Hall, Glenfield 52.655125°N 1.187338°W	1966	Antony Hollaway	Mural	Concrete	h 4.1m; w 20.5m		Leicestershire County Council		

== Charnwood district ==
Image	Title / subject	Location and coordinates	Date	Artist / designer	Type	Material	Dimensions	Designation	Owner / administrator	Wikidata	Notes
	The Pinau Statue	Granby Street, Loughborough 52.770778°N 1.209571°W	1956		Statue	Bronze	h 72.5 cm; w 47 cm; d 60 cm		Charnwood Borough Council		Stolen 1980, recovered and restored 1983
	The Sock	Market Place, Loughborough 52.771043°N 1.206696°W	1998	Shona Kinloch	Sculpture	Bronze	h 183 cm; w 72 cm; d 158 cm		Charnwood Borough Council		
	The Signaler	The Rushes Retail Park, Loughborough 52.774131°N 1.207277°W	2003	John Atkin	Sculpture	Corten steel and stainless steel	h 793 cm; w 305 cm; d 245 cm				
	Swan	Queen's Park, Loughborough 52.770013°N 1.209273°W	1992	David Tarver	Sculpture	Stone			Charnwood Borough Council		
	Canal Life	Canal Basin, Loughborough 52.774489°N 1.210686°W	2007	Graeme Mitcheson	Sculpture	Stone	h 100 cm; w 100 cm; d 100 cm each		Canal and River Trust		
	The Athletes	Ashby Road, Loughborough 52.767582°N 1.235394°W	1997	Julie Doherty	Sculpture	Steel	Middle figure h. 202 cm; w. 70 cm; d. 100 cm		Charnwood Borough Council		
	The Flame	Holywell Way, Loughborough 52.760830°N 1.244017°W	1993	Neil Lawson-Baker	Sculpture	Bronze	h 670 cm				
	Double Movement	Loughborough University, Loughborough 52.7581160°N 1.2461140°W		Michael Gillespie	Sculpture	Bronze			Loughborough University		
	Bathaus	Loughborough University, Loughborough	2017	Studio Weave	Reduced cottage						
	La Retraite	Loughborough University, Loughborough 52°45'41.4"N 1°14'29.8"W		Paul Wager	Sculpture						
	Ornamental Gates and Fencing	Mountfield House, Epinal Way, Loughborough 52.762806°N 1.216550°W	1998	Christopher Campbell	Gates	Galvanised steel					
	Declaration	Beaumanor Hall, Woodhouse, Leicestershire 52.736074°N 1.204936°W	1961	Phillip King	Sculpture	Cement with marble chippings	h 83.8 cm; w 208 cm; d 83.8 cm	Grade II	Leicestershire County Council		

== Harborough district ==
Image	Title / subject	Location and coordinates	Date	Artist / designer	Type	Material	Dimensions	Designation	Owner / administrator	Wikidata	Notes
	Union Wharf Sundial	Union Wharf Market Harborough 52.484541°N 0.930510°W	2000	Marjorie and Michael Clements	Sundial	Wood			Old Union Canals Society		
	Horse and Boy	Towpath at top of Foxton Locks 52.497869°N 0.983396°W			Lifesize sculpture	Bronze					
	Sir Frank Whittle Memorial	Church Street, Lutterworth 52.455663°N 1.201085°W	1987	Ken Ford	Bust	Bronze	h 44 cm; w 28 cm; d 20.5 cm		Lutterworth Town Council		
	Whittle Plane	Rugby Road, Lutterworth 52.450328°N 1.198437°W	2003		Sculpture	Steel and fibreglass			Harborough District Council		Full-size replica of first British jet plane, the Gloster E28/39
	The White Horses of Lutterworth	High Street, Lutterworth 52.453968°N 1.200744°W	2013	Graeme Mitcheson	Ground sculpture	White concrete	h. 5m; w. 22 metres		Lutterworth Town Council		
	Farming Life	Sainsbury's, Market Harborough 52.477004°N 0.917959°W	1993	Richard Kindersley	Mural	Red brick, carved			Sainsbury's plc		

== Hinckley and Bosworth district ==
Image	Title / subject	Location and coordinates	Date	Artist / designer	Type	Material	Dimensions	Designation	Owner / administrator	Wikidata	Notes
	Stocking Up	The Crescent, Hinckley 52.539485°N 1.373390°W	2015	Deborah Bird	Mural						
	Hercules	In a field about 1km S of Market Bosworth 52.616627°N 1.395202°W			Statue			Grade II			
	Battle of Bosworth Memorial	Bosworth Battlefield Heritage Centre, Sutton Cheney, Leicestershire 52.598055°N 1.407552°W			Sundial				Leicestershire County Council		
	Bagworth Miners Memorial	Station Road, Bagworth, Leicestershire 52.673930°N 1.344084°W			Statue	Bronze			Bagworth and Thornton Parish Council		

== Melton district ==
Image	Title / subject	Location and coordinates	Date	Artist / designer	Type	Material	Dimensions	Designation	Owner / administrator	Wikidata	Notes
	Melton Calvary	King Street, Melton Mowbray 52.764600°N 0.886534°W	2007	Ben Coode-Adams	Mural	Galvanised steel	h 220 cm; w 700 cm		Melton District Council		
	Journey through Melton Mowbray	Sainsbury's, Nottingham Road, Melton Mowbray 52.768599°N 0.891616°W	2013	Deborah Bird	Mural				Sainsbury's plc		

== North West Leicestershire district ==
Image	Title / subject	Location and coordinates	Date	Artist / designer	Type	Material	Dimensions	Designation	Owner / administrator	Wikidata	Notes
	Mother and Child	High Street, Coalville 52.724688°N 1.374283°W	1963	Robert John Royden Thomas	Sculpture	Bronze	h 225 cm; w 97 cm; d 45 cm		North West Leicestershire District Council		Returned to Belvoir Shopping Centre from Coalville Library August 2024
	Miners Memorial	High Street, Coalville 52.724771°N 1.371342°W	1998	Judith Holmes Drewry	Sculpture	Silicon Bronze	h 180 cm; w 126 cm; d 67 cm		North West Leicestershire District Council		
	Hands	Grange Road, Hugglescote 52.711011°N 1.366233°W	2010	Hilary Cartmel	Sculpture	Stainless Steel			Hugglescote Parish Council		
	The Hugglescote Bear	Central Road/Fairfield Road, Hugglescote 52.714624°N 1.371642°W	2005	Thomas Kenrick	Sculpture	Bath Limestone	2 m (6 ft 7 in) h		Hugglescote Parish Council		
	Ibstock Landmark Sculpture	High Street, Ibstock 52.683434°N 1.403992°W	1998	Ailsa Magnus	Sculpture	Glazed stoneware	h 122 cm; w 66 cm; d 64 cm		Ibstock Parish Council		
	Wildlife	The Slabs, Quorn, Leicestershire 52.748952°N 1.161951°W	2015	Graeme Mitcheson	Sculpture	Stone					
	The Heart of the Forest	North Street, Ashby-de-la-Zouch 52.748388°N 1.471638°W	2019	Adrian Moakes	Sculpture	Steel			North West Leicestershire District Council		

== Oadby and Wigston district ==
Image	Title / subject	Location and coordinates	Date	Artist / designer	Type	Material	Dimensions	Designation	Owner / administrator	Wikidata	Notes
