= Sean Hedges-Quinn =

British sculptor

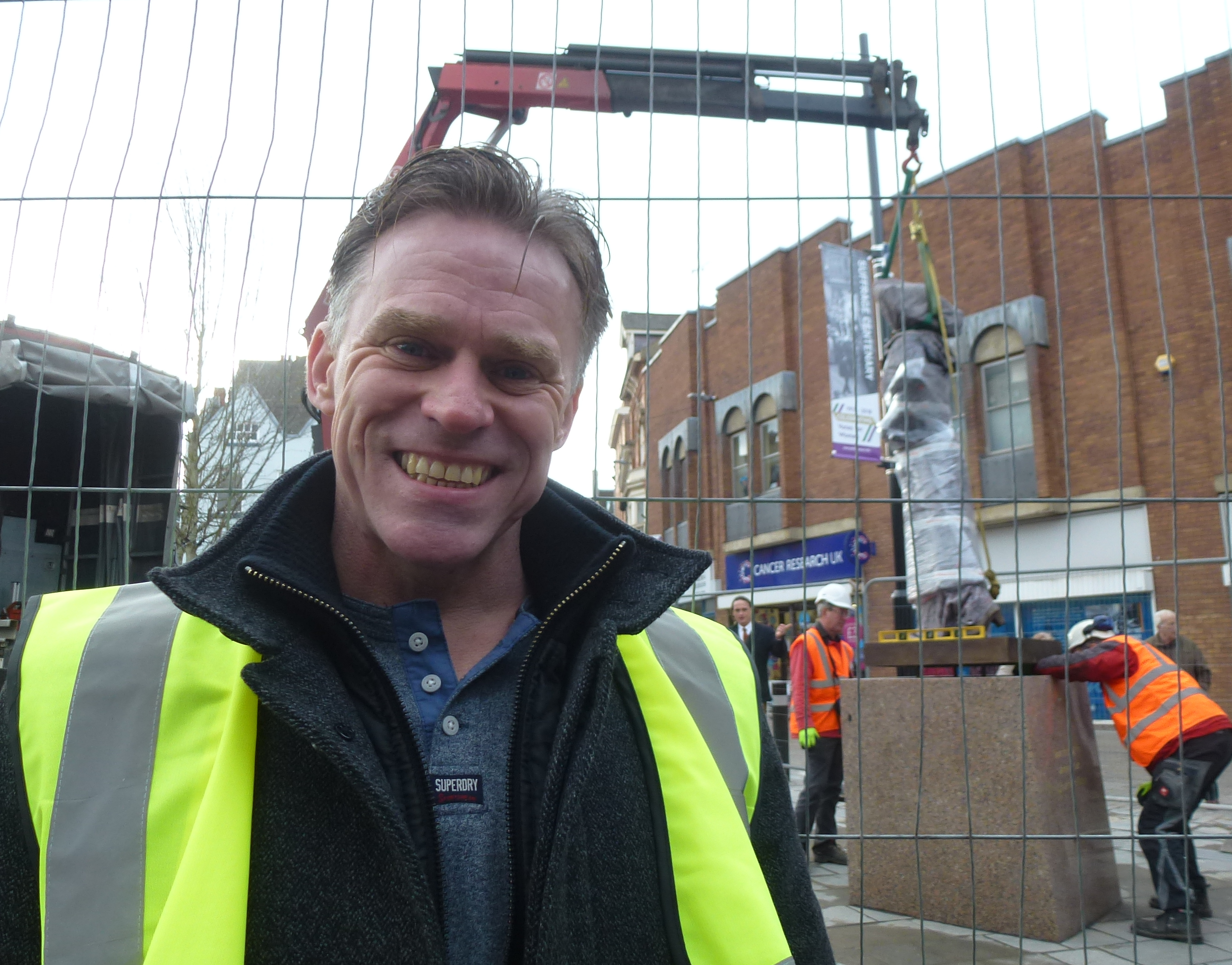
- Sean Hedges-Quinn with his statue of the suffragette Alice Hawkins in Leicester in 2018
- Known for: Sculpture
- Notable work: Bronze statues
- Movement: Bronze Sculpture

Sean Hedges-Quinn is a British sculptor, animator, and film model and prop-maker.

== Life ==
Hedges-Quinn was born in Ipswich in April 1968. After graduating from the University of Hertfordshire, Hedges-Quinn worked in the film industry as a model-maker, prop-master and sculptor. His first role was as a prop-maker on The Borrowers in 1996 before he was taken on by Jim Henson's creature shop in London. He has worked for films such as the 1997 version of Lost in Space, Reign of Fire, The Hours, V for Vendetta, The Phantom of the Opera, 12 Monkeys and as senior prosthetic technician on Clash of the Titans. He has been commissioned to produce statues for several notable footballers including Bobby Robson, Alf Ramsey, Ted Bates, Bob Stokoe, Nat Lofthouse and Kevin Beattie. He has also created statues of Dad's Army's Captain Mainwaring and in 2018, a statue of the suffragette Alice Hawkins which was unveiled in Leicester.

== Personal life ==
Hedges-Quinn works from a studio in Great Bricett near Ipswich, Suffolk.

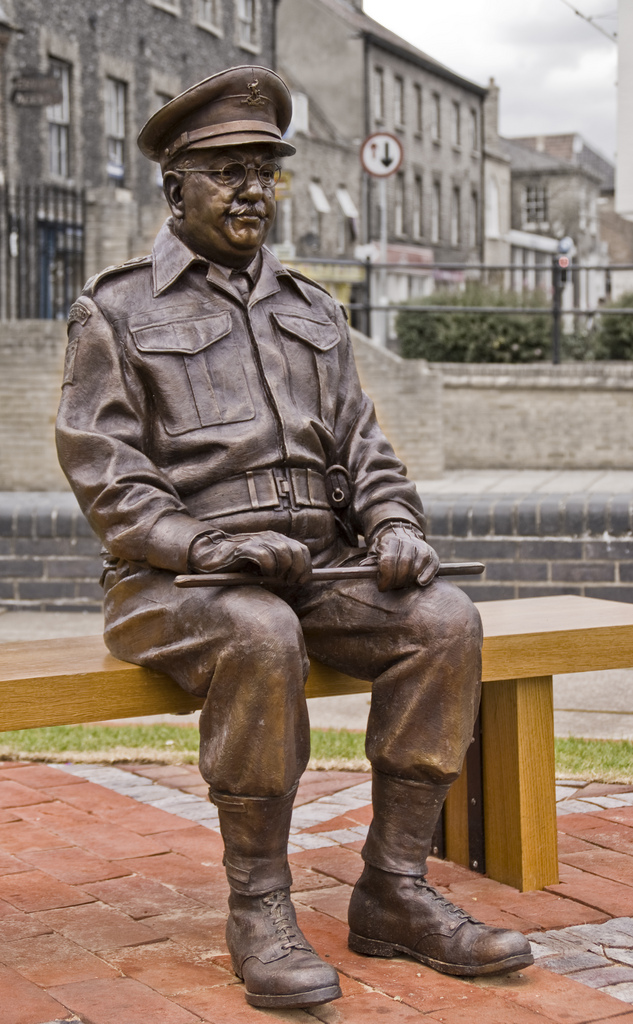
Statue of Captain George Mainwaring, erected in Thetford in June 2010
