= David Webb Peoples =

American screenwriter (born 1940)

- Born: David Webb Peoples; February 9, 1940 (age 86); Middletown, Connecticut, U.S.
- Occupation: Screenwriter
- Spouse: Janet Beebe Peoples
- Children: 2

David Webb Peoples (born February 9, 1940) is an American screenwriter who co-wrote Blade Runner (1982), and later wrote Unforgiven (1992) and 12 Monkeys (1995). He has been nominated for Oscar, Golden Globe, and BAFTA awards. Peoples won the best screenplay awards from the L.A. Film Critics (1991) and National Society of Film Critics (1992) for Unforgiven.

== Early life ==
Peoples was born in Middletown, Connecticut, the son of Ruth Clara (née Levinger) and Joe Webb Peoples, a geologist. He studied English at the University of California, Berkeley.

== Career ==
Peoples worked as a film editor in the 1970s while writing screenplays, but his writing career took off after being hired as co-writer on Blade Runner by director Ridley Scott to rework the script written by screenwriter and Blade Runner executive producer Hampton Fancher. Following the success of Blade Runner, Peoples worked on Ladyhawke (1985) and Leviathan (1989).

During the 1980s, Peoples wrote a script based on DC Comics' Sgt. Rock series. Arnold Schwarzenegger was picked to play the title role; the project was revived three decades later in 2010 involving Joel Silver and Easy Company, although with the expectation to set the narrative in a place other than the battlefields of World War II to distinguish the project from the earlier script.

Other Peoples screenplays were purchased during the 1980s, many after studio development prior to production: Unforgiven, Soldier, and The Blood of Heroes. The Blood of Heroes was directed by Peoples, and starred Rutger Hauer.

Peoples received his greatest recognition for Unforgiven (1992). He had originally written the script in 1976, then entitled The William Munny Killings. Peoples' screwball comedy Hero was filmed and released in 1992, the same year as Unforgiven.

Later in 1992, Peoples worked with his wife, Janet, on 12 Monkeys (1995), a science fiction fable about time travel inspired by Chris Marker's experimental short film La Jetée.

In 1998, Soldier was filmed by British director Paul W. S. Anderson, although it was re-written by Anderson.

== Personal life ==
Peoples and his wife, Janet, have two daughters.

== Filmography ==
Year	Title	Writer	Editor	Director	Notes	Ref.
1969	How We Stopped the War	Yes	Yes	Himself	Short films	
1971	Tricia's Wedding	No	Yes	Milton Miron	Short films	
1973	Steel Arena	No	Yes	Mark L. Lester		
1973	Bizarre Devices	No	Yes	Paul Aratow and Barry J. Spinello		
1974	Lucifer's Women (Note: Also known as Doctor Dracula)	No	Yes	Paul Aratow		
1976	The Joy of Letting Go	No	Yes	John Gregory		
1977	Who Are the DeBolts?	No	Yes	John Korty	Documentary films	
1981	The Day After Trinity	Yes	Yes	Jon H. Else	Documentary films	
1982	Blade Runner	Yes	No	Ridley Scott		
1985	Ladyhawke	Uncredited	No	Richard Donner	Script revisions	
1987	Predator	Uncredited	No	John McTiernan	Script revisions	
1989	Leviathan	Yes	No	George P. Cosmatos		
1989	The Blood of Heroes (Note: Also known as The Salute of the Jugger)	Yes	No	Himself		
1990	Fatal Sky	Yes	No	Frank Shields	Credited as "Anthony Able"	
1992	Unforgiven	Yes	No	Clint Eastwood		
1992	Hero	Yes	No	Stephen Frears		
1995	12 Monkeys	Yes	No	Terry Gilliam		
1998	Soldier	Yes	No	Paul W. S. Anderson		

=== Unproduced screenplays ===
Title	Director	Description	Ref.
My Dog's on Fire	Tony Scott	A comedy about a punk rock band	
Sgt. Rock	Various	An adaptation of the DC Comics character	
Pair-A-Dice	Lawrence Kasdan	A "weird desert island relationship picture"	
To the White Sea	Coen brothers	An adaptation of the novel by James Dickey	
Stompanato (Note: Also known as Johnny Stompanato)	Various	A biopic on the life of gangster Johnny Stompanato	
Vengeance	—N/a	An adaptation of the novel by George Jonas	
The Lone Ranger	—N/a	An adaptation of the radio serial character	
The Prisoner	Christopher Nolan	An adaptation of the 1960s espionage series	
The Grabbers	—N/a	A "new version" of The Treasure of the Sierra Madre	
Mandrake the Magician	Etan Cohen	An adaptation of the comic strip character	
Lone Wolf and Cub	Justin Lin	An adaptation of the Japanese manga series	

== Awards ==
Peoples' highest accolades are for Unforgiven. It received Oscar, Golden Globe and British Academy nominations, and won L.A. Film Critics (1991) and National Society of Film Critics (1992) awards for best screenplay. He was presented with the Distinguished Screenwriter Award at the 2010 Austin Film Festival.

== Sources ==
- Dutka, Elaine (October 5, 1992). "Q&A With David Webb Peoples: A Reluctant Hollywood Hero". Los Angeles Times.
