= Frank Oppenheimer =

American particle physicist and science educator (1912–1985)

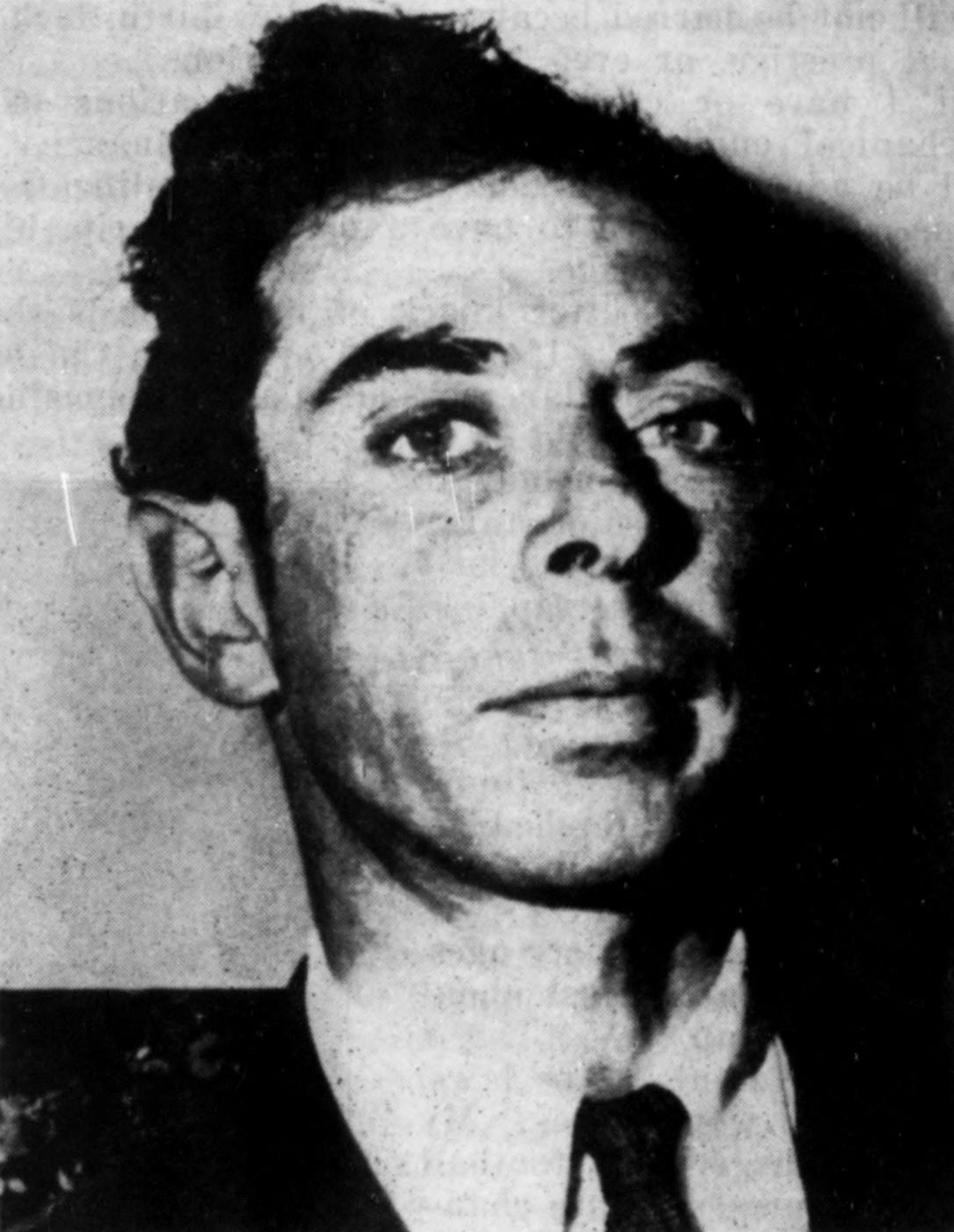
- Born: Frank Friedman Oppenheimer; August 14, 1912; New York City, U.S.
- Died: February 3, 1985 (aged 72); Sausalito, California, U.S.
- Education: Johns Hopkins University (BS); California Institute of Technology (MS, PhD)
- Known for: Target of McCarthyism; Uranium enrichment; Founder and director (1969–1985) of the Exploratorium; Brother of J. Robert Oppenheimer
- Spouses: Jacquenette Quann (m. 1936; died 1980); Mildred Danielson (m. 1982)
- Children: 3
- Relatives: J. Robert Oppenheimer (brother)
- Awards: Guggenheim Fellowship (1965); Oersted Medal (1984)
- Scientific career
- Fields: Particle physicist; Science educator
- Workplaces: Arcetri Observatory; Manhattan Project; Lawrence Berkeley National Laboratory; University of Minnesota; University of Colorado
- Thesis: Beta Ray Spectra (1939)

Frank Friedman Oppenheimer (August 14, 1912 – February 3, 1985) was an American particle physicist, cattle rancher, professor of physics at the University of Colorado, and the founder of the Exploratorium in San Francisco.

The younger brother of renowned physicist J. Robert Oppenheimer, Frank Oppenheimer conducted research on aspects of nuclear physics during the time of the Manhattan Project, and made contributions to uranium enrichment. After the war, Oppenheimer's earlier involvement with the American Communist Party placed him under scrutiny, and he resigned from his physics position at the University of Minnesota. Oppenheimer was a target of McCarthyism and was blacklisted from finding any physics teaching position in the United States until 1957, when he was allowed to teach science at a high school in Colorado. This rehabilitation allowed him to gain a position at the University of Colorado teaching physics. In 1969, Oppenheimer founded the Exploratorium in San Francisco, and he served as its first director until his death in 1985.

== Early life and education ==
Frank Friedman Oppenheimer was born on August 14, 1912 in New York City into a non-observant Jewish family. His parents were Ella (née Friedman), a painter, and Julius Seligmann Oppenheimer, a successful textile importer from Hanau in the Kingdom of Prussia. During his childhood, he studied painting. He also studied the flute under nationally known flutist Georges Barrère, becoming competent enough at the instrument to consider a career as a flautist. He was close to his brother Robert throughout their lives.

Oppenheimer began his schooling at the Ethical Culture School, where he attended until seventh grade. The remainder of his high school education was completed at Fieldston School in Riverdale, a school operated by the Ethical Culture Society.

Following the advice of his older brother Robert, he became a professional physicist. In 1930 he began his studies at Johns Hopkins University, graduating three years later with a B.S. in physics. He then studied for a further 18 months at the Cavendish Laboratory in Cambridge, England. While in England he earned a pilot's license. In 1935, he worked on the development of nuclear particle counters at the Institute di Arcetri in Florence, Italy.

While completing his PhD at the California Institute of Technology, Oppenheimer became engaged to Jacquenette Quann, an economics student at the University of California, Berkeley; she was also active in the Young Communist League. In spite of his brother Robert's advice, Oppenheimer and Jackie were married in 1936 and they both joined the American Communist Party, also against the older brother's advice. Oppenheimer and his wife were atheists.

Oppenheimer received his PhD in 1939 and completed two postdoctoral years at Stanford University.

== Physics career ==
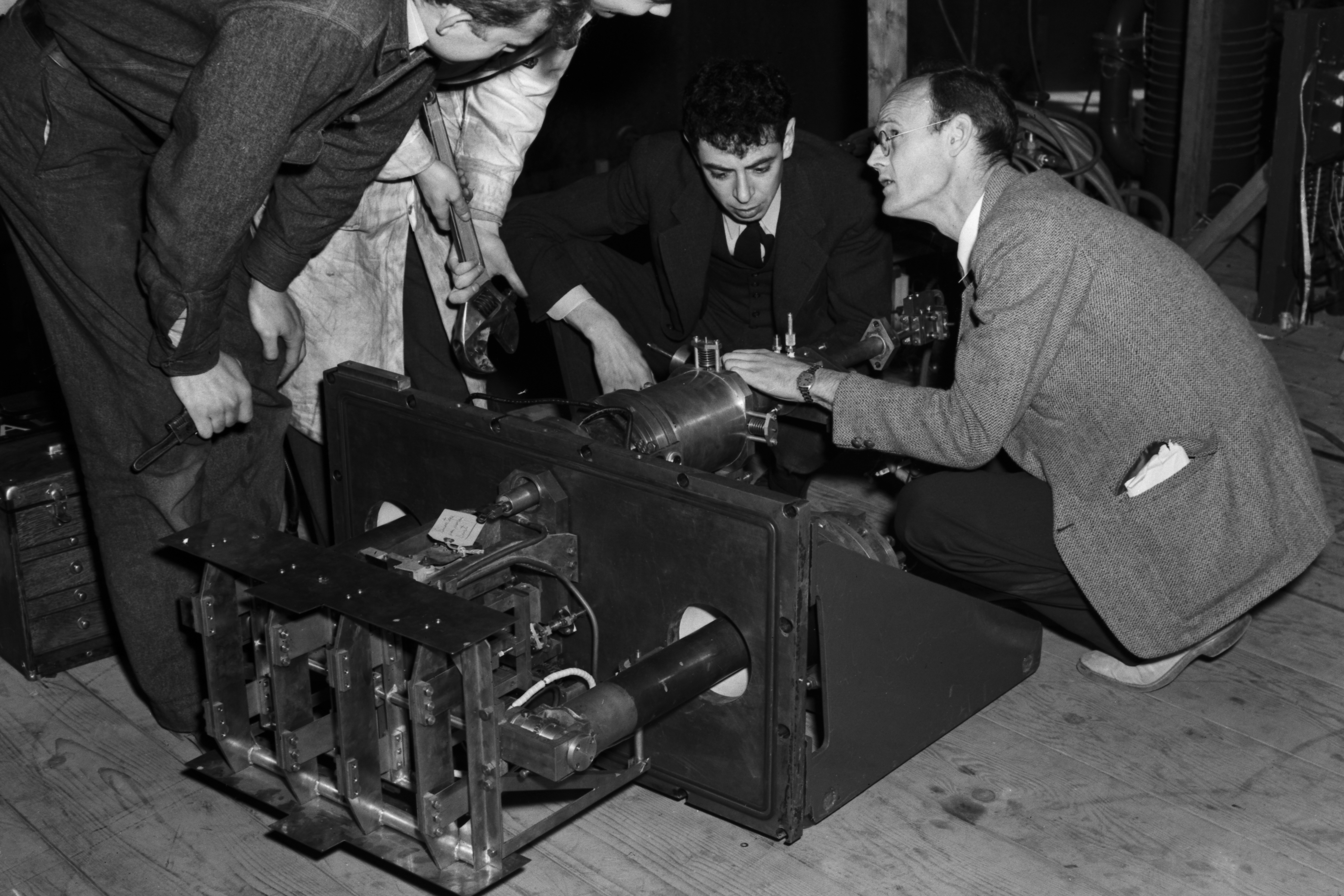
Oppenheimer (center) with part of a calutron at Berkeley (date unknown)

During World War II, Oppenheimer's older brother Robert became the director of the Los Alamos Laboratory, part of the Manhattan Project, the Allied effort to produce the first atomic weapons. From 1941 to 1945 Oppenheimer worked at the University of California Radiation Laboratory on the problem of uranium isotope separation under the direction of his brother's friend, Ernest O. Lawrence. In late 1943 he arrived at the Los Alamos Laboratory, working directly under Kenneth T. Bainbridge. His responsibilities included the instrumentation for the Trinity test site, in New Mexico. In 1945 he was sent to the enrichment facility at Oak Ridge, Tennessee, to help monitor the equipment.

Oppenheimer was involved in the founding of the Association of Los Alamos Scientists, on August 30, 1945. This organization promoted international peaceful control of nuclear power. He later also joined the Federation of American Scientists, and was a member of the American Physical Society.

After the war, Oppenheimer returned to Berkeley, working with Luis Alvarez and Wolfgang Panofsky to develop the proton linear accelerator. In 1947 he took a position as assistant professor of physics at the University of Minnesota, where he participated in the discovery of heavy cosmic ray nuclei.

== Political scrutiny and blacklisting ==
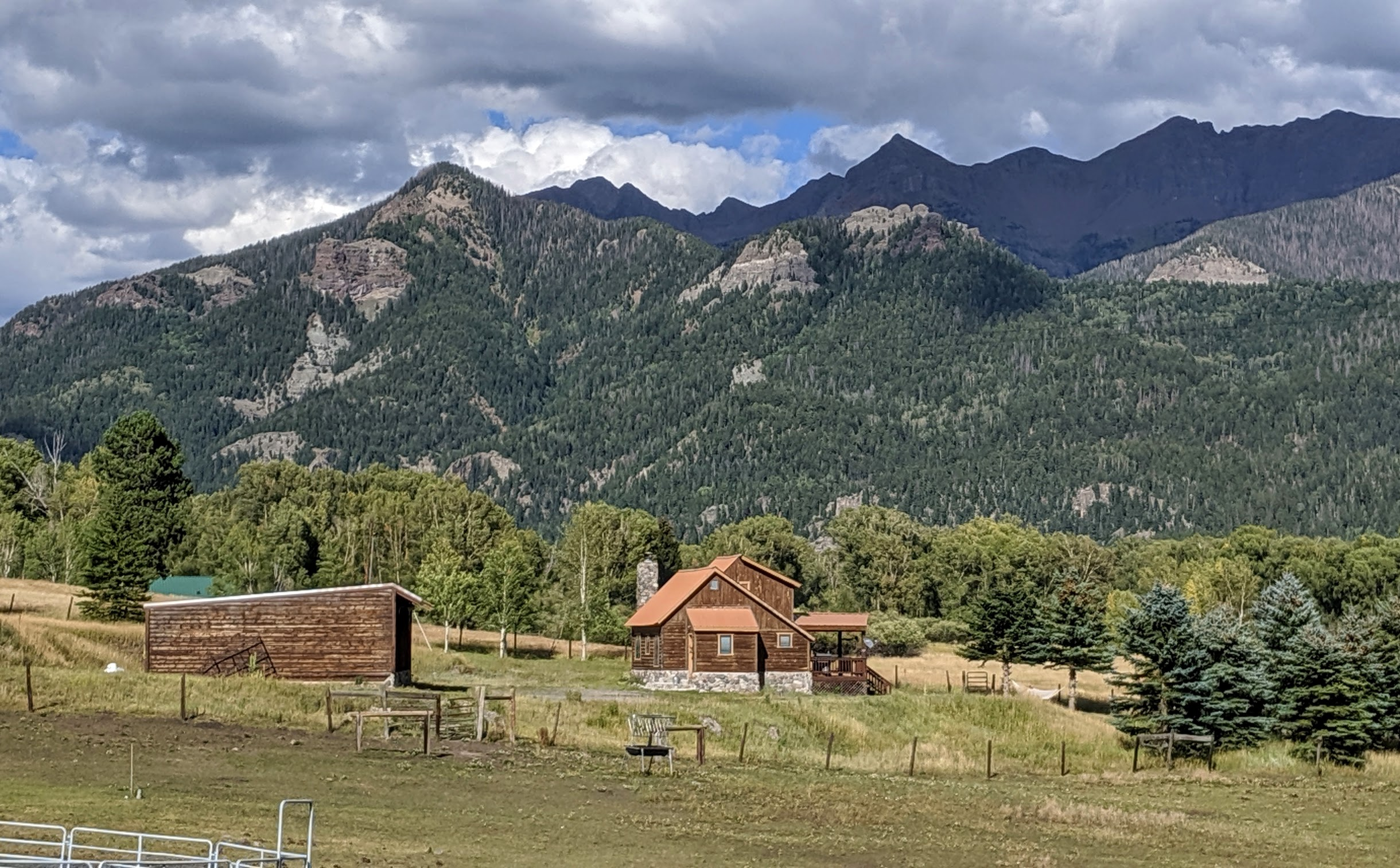
The home that once belonged to Frank Oppenheimer, on his 1,500-acre (610 ha) cattle ranch in the valley of the Rio Blanco in the mountains near Pagosa Springs, Colorado

On July 12, 1947, the Washington Times Herald reported that Oppenheimer had been a member of the Communist Party during the years 1937–1939. At first, he denied these reports, but later said they were true. In June 1949, as part of a larger investigation on the possible mishandling of "atomic secrets" during the war, he was called before the House Committee on Un-American Activities (HUAC). Before the committee, he testified that he and his wife had been members of the Communist Party for about three and a half years. In 1937 they had been involved in local attempts to desegregate the Pasadena public swimming pool, which was open to non-white people only on Wednesday.

Oppenheimer said he and his wife had joined at a time when they sought answers to the high unemployment experienced in the United States during the later part of the Great Depression. He refused to name others he knew to be members. This caused a media sensation — that J. Robert Oppenheimer's brother was a former member of the Communist Party — and led to Oppenheimer resigning his post at the University of Minnesota.

Afterwards Oppenheimer could no longer find work in physics in the United States, and he was also denied a passport, preventing him from working abroad. He and his wife eventually sold one of the Van Gogh paintings that he had inherited from his father, and with the money bought 1,500 acres (610 ha) of ranch land near Pagosa Springs, Colorado, and spent nearly a decade as cattle ranchers.

== Return to teaching ==
In 1957, the Red Scare had lessened to the point that Oppenheimer was allowed to teach science at a local high school.

Frank taught a number of subjects within the field of science such as chemistry, physics, biology in addition to general science at the local High School in Pagosa Springs, Colorado. He expressed his driving force to teach was to simply share his appreciation and skills to the youth, and to prepare them for learning as if they might prepare for higher education in the field of science.

Under Oppenheimer's tutelage, several students from Pagosa Springs High School took first prize at the Colorado State Science Fair. Within two years, supported by endorsements from physicists Hans Bethe, George Gamow, and Victor Weisskopf, Oppenheimer was offered a position at the University of Colorado teaching physics.

While returning to particle physics research, Oppenheimer also took an increasing interest in developing improvements in science education. He was eventually awarded a grant from the National Science Foundation to develop new pedagogical methods, which resulted in a "Library of Experiments"—nearly one hundred models of classical laboratory experiments which could be used in aiding the teaching of physics to elementary and high school children. These models would later become the core of the first exhibits at the Exploratorium. Oppenheimer also worked with the Physical Science Study Committee (PSSC), helping to develop a new high school physics curriculum in the immediate post-Sputnik years.

In his work, Oppenheimer followed the well-known old Latin principle Docendo discimus—"the (best) way to learn is to teach".

== Exploratorium ==
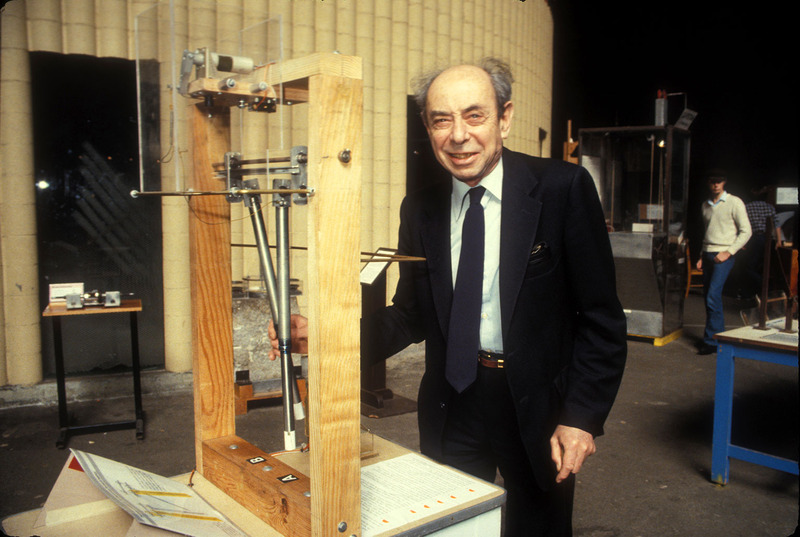
Oppenheimer as Director of the Exploratorium standing next to the Coupled Pendulums exhibit c. 1980

In 1965, Oppenheimer was awarded a Guggenheim Fellowship to study the history of physics and to conduct bubble chamber research at University College London, where he was exposed to European science museums for the first time. Oppenheimer created a similar resource in the United States. Upon his return from Europe, he was offered a job planning a new branch of the Smithsonian Institution in Washington, D.C., but instead chose to work on setting up a completely independent new type of museum in San Francisco.

Four years later, in 1969, the Exploratorium opened its doors, set within the north wing of the Palace of Fine Arts of San Francisco. Oppenheimer was able to fund the opening of the Exploratorium partly due to a grant from the San Francisco Foundation. The San Francisco Foundation gave a $50,000 grant to Oppenheimer to open the 90,000-square-foot (8,400 m^{2}) facility.

Oppenheimer served as the first director of the museum, and later continued to be involved in the museum's daily operations. He had visited the Tel Aviv Science Museum in 1965, and later used several of Ivan Moscovich's designs and exhibits in his revolutionary Exploratorium in San Francisco. The first exhibits in the Exploratorium were constructed with the aid of the Stanford Linear Accelerator Center (SLAC) and the Ames Research Center (NASA).

Oppenheimer had a lifelong belief in the importance of art in an equal and closely connected relationship to science. He recruited artist Bob Miller to create Sun Painting, the first major art installation at the Exploratorium. Another early work was the Tactile Dome (1971), by August Coppola (father of actor Nicolas Cage and brother of the film director Francis Coppola). This was a three-dimensional tightly convoluted passage that was completely dark inside, and which visitors had to explore relying on the sense of touch. Renewed versions of both are still on display today. In 1974, Oppenheimer established an ongoing artist-in-residence program at the Exploratorium, regularly bringing in both emerging and established artists working in art and science.

The Exploratorium provided a form of "educational sightseeing" as well as the understanding of the underlying principles. The exhibits were arranged and structured to allow for free access to any part of the museum. Instead of tour guides, fifteen to twenty college students or secondary students, as well as some adults, were employed as "explainers". They demonstrate the exhibits and explain the principles involved all while circulating among visitors, rather than guiding them along.

== Final years ==
In 1977, Oppenheimer was diagnosed with lymphoma, and underwent two years of successful chemotherapy. Oppenheimer's first wife Jacquenette, died in 1980. In 1982, he married Mildred "Milly" Danielson.

In 1983, lung cancer was discovered (he was a heavy smoker), and he underwent a lobectomy, in spite of which he continued to play the flute. Oppenheimer still remained active, appearing at the Exploratorium nearly daily until the last few weeks of his life. He died at home in Sausalito, California, on February 3, 1985.

== Legacy ==
When Oppenheimer died in 1985, he was survived by his second wife Mildred, son Michael, and daughter Judith — as well as a third child, Sarah, from a relationship he had with the wife of a friend and colleague at the University of Colorado.

Sarah had been raised by her mother and the colleague and only learned of her relationship to Oppenheimer when she was contacted in 2019 by Oppenheimer's son, Michael. Sarah and Michael verified their genetic relationship in 2020. A brief account of the affair can be found in Judy Oppenheimer's book From Deedle to Dr. Judy: A Memoir of Metamorphosis.

Oppenheimer's papers and archives were transferred to the Bancroft Library at the University of California, Berkeley, including over 60 technical and nontechnical papers he'd authored. The bulk of this collection covers his work in physics and education in the years leading up to his founding of the Exploratorium. Also included are papers related to his investigation by the House Un-American Activities Committee (HUAC). Historical archives of the Exploratorium (1957–present) are also kept at the Bancroft. The University of Minnesota holds archives covering Oppenheimer's physics work during 1946–1959.

Oppenheimer considered the Exploratorium and its educational programs to be his most important accomplishment and legacy. A collection of selected Oppenheimer papers on science, art, and education is available online at the Exploratorium website.

The Frank Oppenheimer Fellowship Fund was created at the Exploratorium to provide for the exchange of science museum personnel both nationally and internationally.

=== In media ===
Interviewed by director Jon Else, Oppenheimer appears throughout The Day After Trinity (1980), an Academy Award-nominated documentary about J. Robert Oppenheimer and the building of the atomic bomb.

Garrick Hagon portrayed Oppenheimer in the 1980 BBC series, Oppenheimer. Dylan Arnold plays the role of Frank Oppenheimer in the 2023 biopic film Oppenheimer by Christopher Nolan.

== Awards ==
- Distinguished Service Award, University of Colorado
- Distinguished Alumni Award, Caltech
- Guggenheim Fellowship 1965
- Millikan Award, American Association of Physics Teachers (AAPT) 1973
- Distinguished Service Award, American Association of Museums (AAM) 1982
- Oersted Medal, American Association of Physics Teachers (AAPT) 1984
- Kirkwood Award for Distinguished Service, Caltech

== See also ==
- Hybrid arts
- Science education
- Science museums
