= Alice Hawkins =

English suffragette

- Alice Hawkins selling "Votes for Women"
- Born: Alice Riley; 1863; Stafford, Staffordshire, England
- Died: 1946 (aged 83); Leicester, Leicestershire, England
- Monuments: Statue of Alice Hawkins
- Occupations: Boot and shoe machinist
- Organization: Women’s Social and Political Union
- Known for: Leading suffragette in Leicester
- Political party: Independent Labour Party
- Spouse: Alfred Hawkins
- Children: 6

Alice Hawkins (1863–1946) was a leading English suffragette among the boot and shoe machinists of Leicester. She went to prison five times for acts committed as part of the Women’s Social and Political Union (WSPU) militant campaign. Her husband Alfred Hawkins was also an active suffragist and received £100 when his kneecap was fractured as he was ejected from a meeting in Bradford. In 2018 a statue of Alice was unveiled in Leicester Market Square.

== Life ==
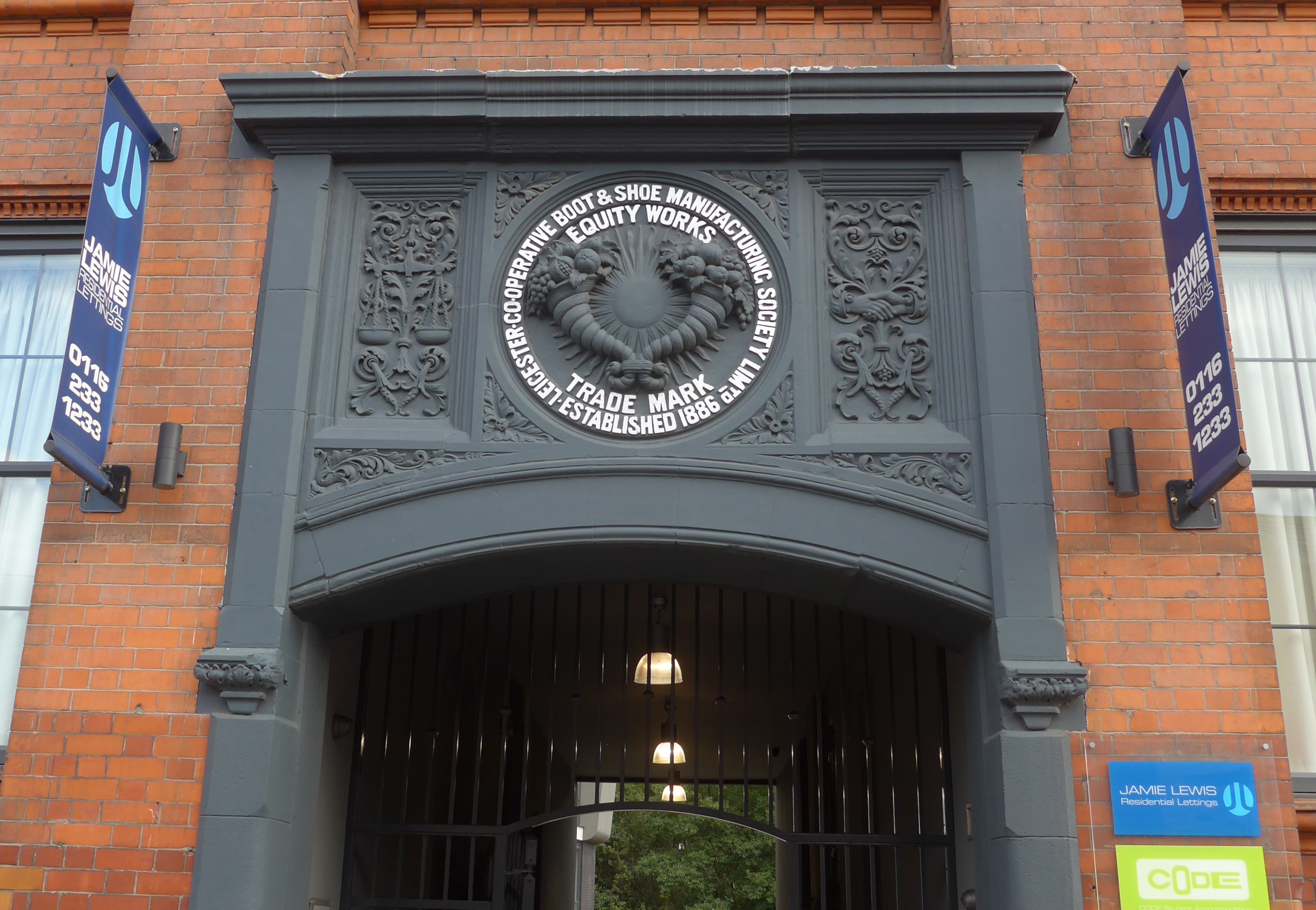
The entrance to the factory where Hawkins worked now has a plaque in her honour

Alice Riley was born in 1863 in Stafford, one of ten children, 7 girls 3 boys. By 23/24 years old, she moved to Leicester creating boots and shoes. In 1884 she married Alfred Hawkins, whom she lived in the next street to.

Hawkins became a mother of six children and continued to work as a machinist at Equity Shoes. In 1896 she joined the new factory's new Women's Co-operative Guild where she learnt about socialism and the writings of Thomas Mann. The factory had a library and allowed time for political education. She corresponded with other socialists, such as Tom Anderson of Glasgow, in 1906.

Hawkins joined the Independent Labour Party in 1894 and through that organisation met Sylvia Pankhurst. Pankhurst came to Leicester in 1907 and Hawkins made introductions. They were soon joined by Mary Gawthorpe and they established a WSPU presence in Leicester.

=== Activism and imprisonment ===
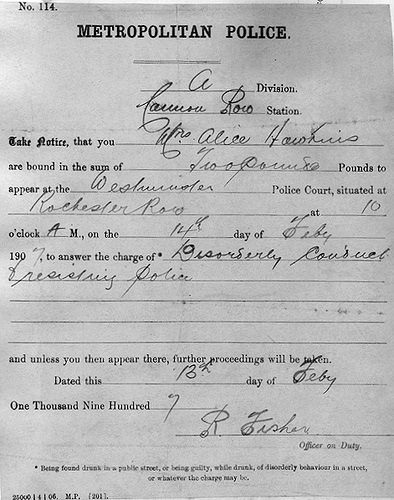
Alice Hawkins bail notice for resisting arrest on 1 February 1907

Hawkins was first jailed in February 1907, after attending her first suffragette rally in Hyde Park, when 300 women then marched to Parliament, after hearing that votes for women was not on the King's Speech. She was among 29 women sent to Holloway Prison after a brutal charge by 20 police on horses and a pitched battle. Her lawyer wrote to the local MP that "in no other civilised country would women be dealt with in this manner." Bail was set at £2 for disorderly conduct and resisting the police, but all the women arrested chose to serve jail sentences instead. Supporters from the suffragette movement stood outside and cheered when the women were released after two weeks in jail, and marched to a celebratory breakfast. Hawkins read out the MP's response which was that the behaviour of the women was "not doing any good for the cause and that the WSPU had now lost the public interest." She returned to Leicester and set up a branch of the WSPU inviting Emmeline Pankhurst to speak, and she signed up the first 30 members.

In June 1908, Flora Drummond invited Hawkins to speak at the Hyde Park rally on 21 June 1908. The event was advertised on a Thames barge outside the Houses of Parliament, saying "Cabinet Ministers Specially Invited." The Pankhursts sent a chauffeur-driven car to collect her and local children followed the vehicle.

Hawkins was jailed a second time in 1909 as she tried to force entry into a public meeting where Winston Churchill was speaking in Leicester, at which suffragettes had been specifically barred. In this case the lead role was played by her husband, Alfred, who volunteered to raise the issue. During Churchill's speech, Alfred asked Churchill to explain how he could "stand on a democratic platform" while women did not have a vote. He was ejected from the event. Alice was protesting outside when she too was arrested. Alfred paid the fine, but Alice again opted for prison. This time she was imprisoned in Leicester jail and she went on hunger strike.

Alfred also defended Alice when heckled by men in a crowd where she was speaking saying "get back to your family!" She was able to say "here is my family they are here to support me" as Alfred was demonstrably for the cause, which some but not by any means all suffragists could claim. Alfred suffered for his support, when he was eventually awarded £100 compensation after having his leg broken during a suffragette protest on 26 November 1910. His case had been taken up by the Men's Political Union for Women's Enfranchisement after he was thrown down some stairs after protesting against Winston Churchill during a Liberal party meeting Bradford. The judge ruled that he had been ejected without warning after merely asking a question and that was an assault.

When then 1911 census was enumerated, Hawkins participated in the suffragette census boycott. Her third imprisonment was later in 1911 after throwing a brick through a Home Office window in full view of a policeman. When Emmeline Pankhurst's son Tom died of a brain tumour in 1912, Hawkins wrote to Pankhurst in deep sympathy.

Hawkins was jailed twice more in 1913, first for throwing ink into a Leicester post box, and then a last time for digging a slogan into a golf course at night. She received a Hunger Strike Medal from the WSPU. Hawkins was one of the prisoners who built a relationship with the female prison warders, who were also working-class women and comforted the prisoners as well as having the job of holding them down to be force-fed.

In 1913 Hawkins was among the representatives chosen to speak with leading politicians David Lloyd George and Sir Edward Grey. The meeting had been arranged by Annie Kenney and Flora Drummond with the proviso that these were working-class women representing their class. The boot and shoe industry was particularly unfair in its treatment of women, who did exactly the same work as men but for unequal pay, lived in the poor quality housing and worked in sweated conditions. All the representatives explained that to improve the terrible pay and working conditions of women, their hope was that a vote would enable women to challenge the status quo in a democratic manner. Hawkins explained how her fellow male workers could choose a man to represent them whilst the women were left unrepresented. She was also suspected of being one of the four women who damaged a golf course writing "no votes, no golf" in horse dung, but this was not proven.

Her protests ceased when war was declared in 1914 and the WSPU agreed to cease protests in exchange for having all prisoners released. Home Office report that 1,300 women were arrested over the years in this cause, along with 100 men like Alice Hawkins' husband Alfred.

In 2023, Leicester City Council erected a blue plaque at number 18, Mantle Road, Leicester, in an area known as Newfoundpool, where Hakwins had lived between 1905 and 1910.

=== Later life ===
Three of Hakwins's sons joined the army in World War I, in different regiments, and all met by chance 10 miles behind enemy lines and a local photographer captured them. When some women were given the vote in the Representation of the People Act (1918), Hawkins was proud of the role that women had taken in the factories and land during the war, and also said that suffragette action had led to this and the right to vote. Due to the property-owning conditions of the Act however, she was unable to vote herself for a further 10 years, at the age of 63. Alfred died in 1928 and Hawkins had to live with her children and families, due to her poverty.

== Death and legacy ==
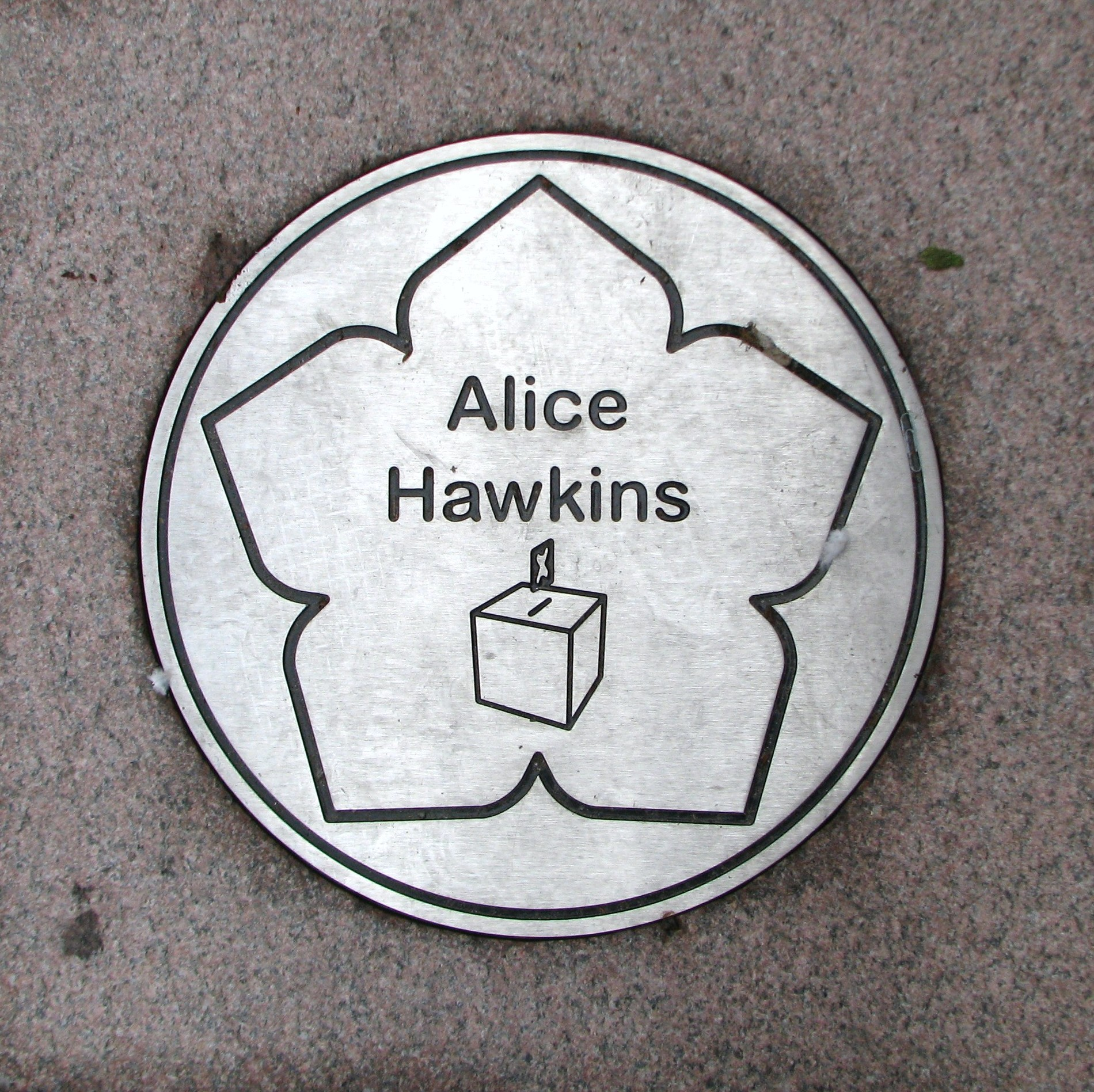
on the Leicester Walk of Fame

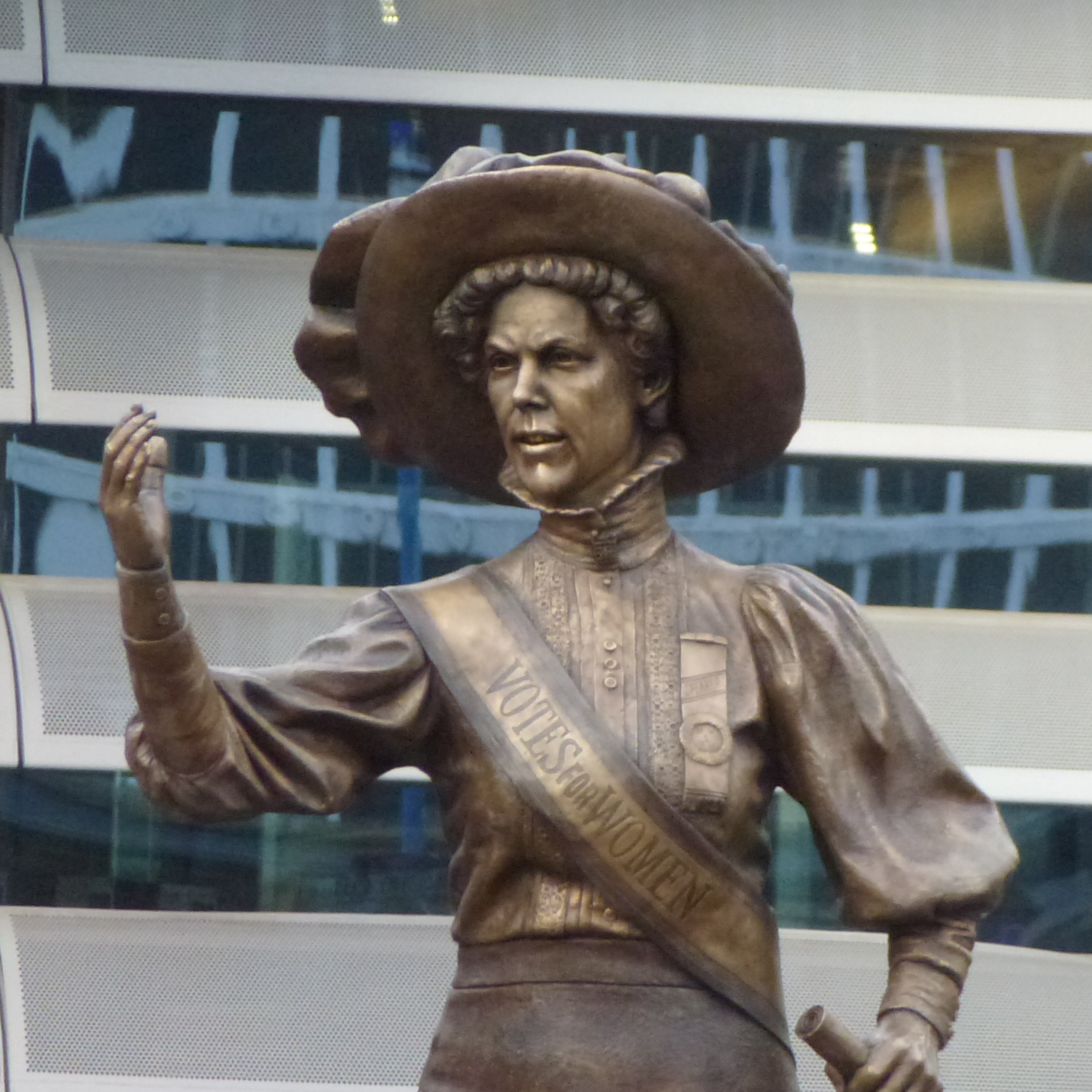
Alice Hawkins statue in Leicester Market

When Hawkins died in 1946, aged 83, her burial had to be paid for by the state, in a "pauper's grave".

She has a plaque at her workplace and another on the Leicester Walk of Fame. In 2018, a five-year funding campaign ended when a seven foot high statue was unveiled in market square by four women including Manjula Sood and Liz Kendall. The ceremony was witnessed by Helen Pankhurst, dozens of her relatives and hundreds of people, as part of the centenary celebrations of Votes for Women.

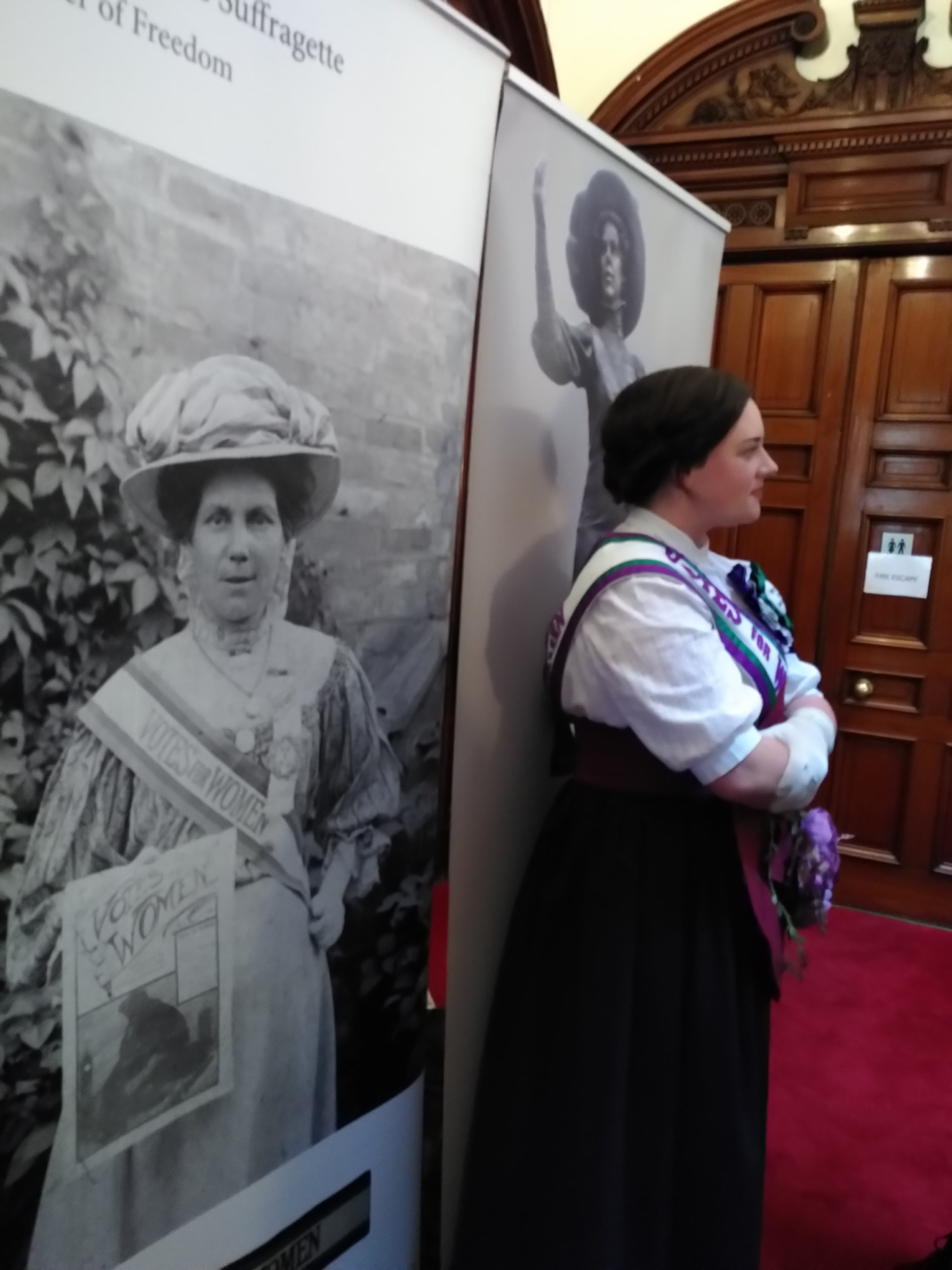
Ruth Pownall as Alice Hawkins Suffragette at Edinburgh Fringe Festival 2023

Her great-grandson, Peter Barratt speaks to schools and at public events, a century later, that Hawkins was fighting for women to have equal pay and that is still not achieved, and encouraging all people to use their right to vote. He found the transcript in the National Archives of the delegation including Hawkins of Working Women to Lloyd George, the chancellor, from January 1913. In 2023, he created and performed an Edinburgh Festival Fringe show, with historical re-enactment actress, Ruth Pownall: Alice Hawkins Suffragette - A Sister for Freedom in which he shared family archive material as well as public material.

Hawkins granddaughter, Vera recounted that her grandmother said: "Vera, you must use your vote, we suffered for it".

== Other sources ==
- Alice Hawkins: And the Suffragette Movement in Edwardian Leicester, 2007
- Tejera, P. (2018). Reinas de la carretera. Madrid. Ediciones Casiopea.
