= The Day After Trinity =

1980 American documentary film

- DVD cover, 2002, with photograph by Philippe Halsman, 1958
- Directed by: Jon H. Else
- Written by: David Peoples; Janet Peoples; Jon Else
- Produced by: Jon H. Else; Peter Baker (executive producer)
- Starring: Hans Bethe; Robert Serber; Robert Wilson; Frank Oppenheimer; I.I. Rabi; Freeman Dyson; Stanislaw Ulam; J. Robert Oppenheimer (archive footage)
- Narrated by: Paul Frees
- Cinematography: Tom McDonough; David Espar; Stephen Lighthill
- Edited by: David Peoples; Ralph Wikke
- Music by: Martin Bresnick
- Production company: KTEH
- Distributed by: Pyramid Films (non-theatrical); PBS (television)
- Release date: January 20, 1981
- Running time: 88 minutes
- Country: United States
- Language: English

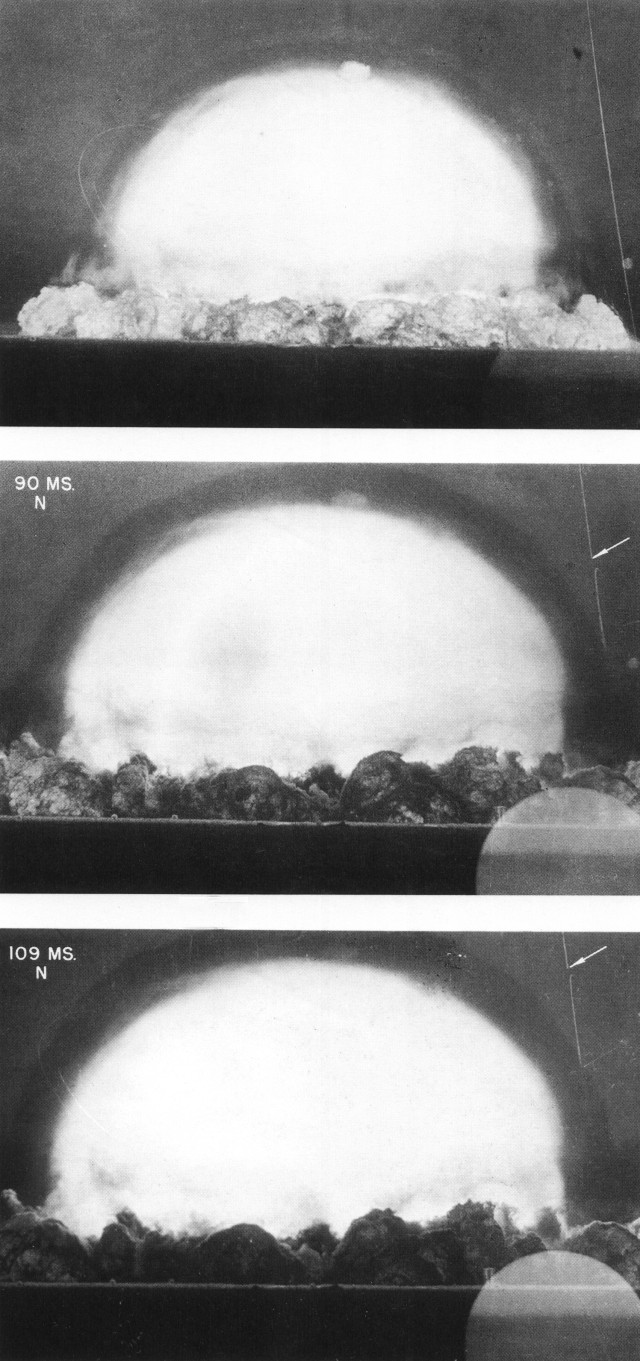
Trinity test, the first nuclear explosion (July 16, 1945)

The Day After Trinity (or The Day After Trinity: J. Robert Oppenheimer and the Atomic Bomb) is a 1981 documentary film directed and produced by Jon H. Else in association with KTEH public television in San Jose, California.

== Synopsis ==
The film tells the story of J. Robert Oppenheimer (1904–1967), the theoretical physicist who led the effort to build the first atomic bomb, tested in July 1945 at Trinity site in New Mexico. It features interviews with several Manhattan Project scientists, as well as newly declassified archival footage.

The film's title comes from an interview seen near the conclusion of the documentary. Robert Oppenheimer is asked for his thoughts on Sen. Robert F. Kennedy's efforts to urge President Lyndon Johnson to initiate talks to stop the spread of nuclear weapons. "It's 20 years too late," Oppenheimer replies. After a pause, he states, "It should have been done the day after Trinity."

== Interviewees ==
In order of first appearance

- Haakon Chevalier – writer, friend of J. Robert Oppenheimer
- Hans Bethe – Los Alamos physicist, Nobel laureate in physics
- Francis Fergusson – writer, friend of J. Robert Oppenheimer
- Robert Serber – physicist, Los Alamos
- Robert Wilson – physicist, Los Alamos
- Frank Oppenheimer – physicist, Los Alamos, brother of Robert Oppenheimer
- I.I. Rabi – Manhattan Project physicist, Nobel laureate
- Freeman Dyson – physicist, Institute for Advanced Study
- Stirling Colgate – physicist, Los Alamos
- Stan Ulam – mathematician, Los Alamos
- Robert Porton – G.I., at Los Alamos during World War II
- Françoise Ulam – writer, wife of Stanislaw Ulam
- Dorothy McKibbin – former head, Manhattan Project office, Santa Fe, New Mexico
- Robert Krohn – physicist, Los Alamos
- Jane Wilson – writer, wife of Robert Wilson
- Jon Else – filmmaker, interviewer
- Holm Bursom – rancher, Socorro, New Mexico
- Dave MacDonald – rancher, Socorro, New Mexico
- Susan Evans – resident, New Mexico
- Elizabeth Ingram – merchant, San Antonio, New Mexico

== Interviewees in archival film ==
- J. Robert Oppenheimer
- General Leslie Groves
- President Harry Truman
- Senator Joseph McCarthy

== Production ==
David Peoples noted the experience of the film, which he worked with his wife Janey and director Jon H. Else:

Janet and I first collaborated on a film very early on when I was still a film editor. Jon Else, who was a giant in documentary filmmaking asked me to edit and write with him on a picture about Robert Oppenheimer. At that point Janet said she was going to write a book about Oppenheimer and she knew more than I did about him, so Jon said why doesn’t she write with us. I went on editing the film. Jan, Jon and I worked on the writing. All three of us admired tremendously, Donald Brittain at the Canadian film board who made a wonderful film called Volcano about the life of Malcolm Lowry who wrote Under the Volcano. It’s a beautiful film about him with no narration and just one interview after another. We all agreed that that’s what we wanted to do – make a documentary with no narration. So, Janet and I set out all the books and forming the narrative. We wrote a fictional documentary with them saying things we wanted them to say. Jon got many wonderful interviews, but we couldn’t get the interviews to tell the whole story and we needed the narration. So, we worked on that. Day After Trinity was a great experience.

== Home media ==
The Day After Trinity was released on VHS cassette by Pyramid Home Video, and on Region 1 DVD by Image Entertainment. A CD-ROM that was released in 1995 included interviews, transcripts, annotations, biographies, and other information.

In July 2023, after the release of Christopher Nolan's Oppenheimer, the Criterion Channel streamed The Day After Trinity for free; it was one of the service's most-streamed films during that time. It is also available for free viewing and download at the Internet Archive.

== Reviews ==
The beginning of the nuclear age is not a single subject, but a series of subjects that lead one to another in an unending chain reaction...That this is tacitly recognized is the most valuable aspect of The Day after Trinity: J. Robert Oppenheimer and the Atomic Bomb, Jon Else's documentary feature that opens today (January 20, 1981) at the Public Theater. The film serves as a kind of introduction to a period of history that is very easily ignored in favor of subjects of far less immediate concern. Mr. Else, and the movie, share with Oppenheimer an awful suspicion that when the first bomb was successfully detonated on the New Mexico desert in July 1945, it signaled the beginning of the end.

— Vincent Canby, The New York Times

== Awards ==
The Day After Trinity was nominated for an Academy Award for Best Documentary Feature of 1980, and received a Peabody Award in 1981. The film also won a CINE Golden Eagle Award.
