= Suite Punta del Este =

Song by Astor Piazzolla
- Released: 1982
- Genre: tango nuevo
- Length: 18:38
- Songwriter: Ástor Piazzolla

I. Introduccion: Allegro pesante.
sample

II. Coral: Adagio.
sample

III. Fuga: Allegro vivace.
sample

Suite Punta del Este is a tango nuevo work for orchestral strings and a bandoneón written by the Argentine composer Astor Piazzolla in 1982. Punta del Este is a Uruguayan seaside resort where the artist spent many summers and particularly enjoyed shark fishing.

It is broken into 3 movements:

1. Introduccion: Allegro pesante
2. Coral: Adagio
3. Fuga: Allegro vivace

Suite Punta del Este is a scored for bandoneón, flute, oboe, clarinet, bassoon, and strings.

== Legacy ==
It has been used as a signature theme for the 1995 science fiction film 12 Monkeys as well as a model for music in a scene in The Simpsons episode "Yokel Chords".
