= Korstia Korchenko =

American professional wrestler

Personal information
- Born: David Strawn; November 3, 1956 (age 69) Tampa, Florida, U.S.

Professional wrestling career
- Ring name(s): Korstia Korchenko; Kostia Korchenko; Boris Korchenko; Vladic Smirnoff; Mike Diamond; Mugsy Malone; Skull Murphy Jr.
- Billed height: 6 ft 4 in (1.93 m)
- Billed weight: 319 lb (145 kg)
- Billed from: Russia (formerly Soviet Union)
- Trained by: Boris Malenko
- Debut: 1978
- Retired: 1989

David Strawn (born November 3, 1956) is an American retired professional wrestler and actor, best known by the ring name Korstia Korchenko, who played a fictional Russian character during his career. He competed in Continental Wrestling Association, Mid-South Wrestling, Central States Wrestling and other Southern territories during the 1980s.

== Career ==
Korchenko made his professional wrestling debut in 1978 in Georgia as Mike Diamond.

In 1982, he became a Russian as Vladic Smirnoff in Mid-South.

In November 1984, he won NWA Mid-America Heavyweight Championship when he defeated Jacques Rougeau Jr. in Memphis, Tennessee. A month later, he dropped the title to Mike Sharpe.

His most remembered stint was in Mid-South, where he partook in one of the most famous angles ever there. Managed at the time by “Hot Stuff” Eddie Gilbert, Korchenko aligned himself with Ivan Koloff and Nikita Koloff during their feud with Mid-South owner Bill Watts in June 1986.

Later in his career, he worked in Kansas City and teamed with the Russian Brute (George Petrovsky).

He retired from professional wrestling in 1989.

Was the promoter for Colorado Championship Wrestling.

Also became an actor in the early 1990s.

== Filmography ==
Year	Title	Role	Notes
1991	Amerikanskiy shpion	Yuri Korchenko	Film
1995	12 Monkeys	Thug #1	Film
1996	Condition Red (film)	Prison Inmate	Film

== Championships and accomplishments ==
- Continental Wrestling Association
  - NWA Mid-America Heavyweight Championship (1 time)
