= Sweatworking =

Bonding workout

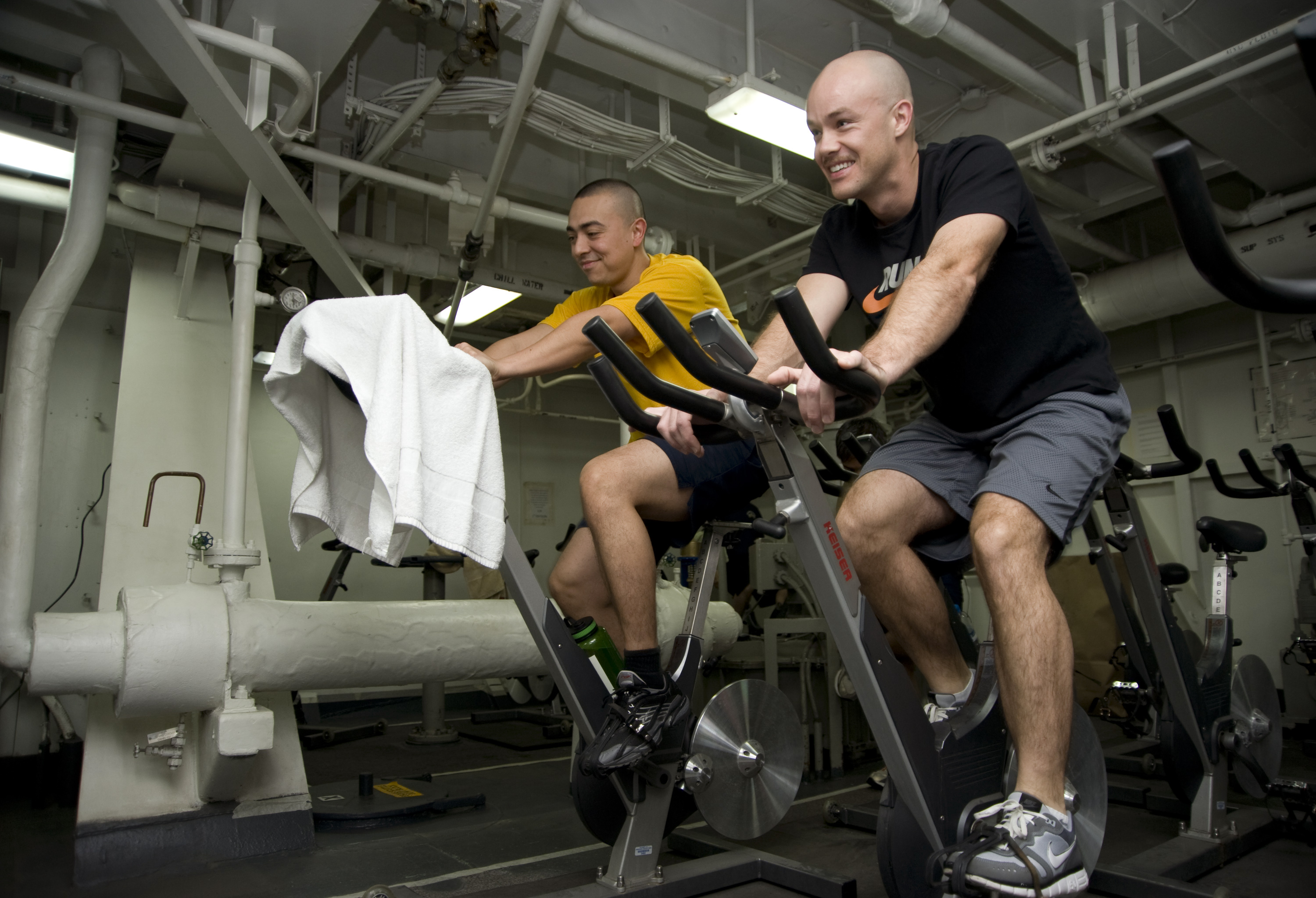
Spinning is a popular mode of exercise for sweatworking because it is simple and accessible; appeals to both sexes; and its difficulty can be varied to enable weak athletes to keep up.

Sweatworking is business networking while taking physical exercise and so working up a sweat. This way of working originated in the US and started to be promoted in London in 2012, where gyms offered facilities and sessions of this kind.

Journalist Lucy Kellaway tried sweatworking with the chairman of Wiggle, Andy Bond, who had experience of similar activity at Asda, playing five-a-side football with Archie Norman. While there was little opportunity to talk during their spinning session at Fitness First, they agreed that the shared experience of suffering was effective in establishing a bond.

Golf is a traditional sporting activity which is often used for business networking but women have felt especially excluded from this.

The first complete guide to Sweatworking was released in November 2025 by wellness pioneer Sean Burch. The book, titled Sweatworking: The Mastery Guide to Revolutionizing Your Life & Professional Relationships Through Wellness, explores how shared physical challenges such as workouts, outdoor events, and endurance experiences can build stronger business relationships, trust, and leadership teams. It serves as a practical guide for companies seeking to reframe networking through the lens of sweat, resilience, and authentic human connection—emphasizing that lasting bonds are forged through shared effort, not small talk.
