= Janet Peoples =

American screenwriter

- Born: 1938 (age 87–88); United States
- Spouse: David Webb Peoples

Janet Peoples (born 1938) is an American screenwriter. She co-wrote the script for the 1995 Academy Award-nominated film 12 Monkeys with her husband David Peoples who has written a number of films, mostly science fiction or fantasy. Peoples and her husband also co-wrote the 1980 documentary The Day After Trinity, which was also nominated for an Academy Award and won a Peabody award.
