= Sing Faster: The Stagehands' Ring Cycle =

1999 documentary film

- Directed by: Jon H. Else
- Produced by: Richard Berge
- Starring: Kenneth 'Spike' Kirkland
- Edited by: Jay Boekelheide
- Music by: Richard Wagner
- Production company: Independent Television Service
- Distributed by: PBS (TV); Direct Cinema
- Release date: January 22, 1999 (Sundance Film Festival)
- Running time: 55 minutes
- Country: US

Sing Faster: The Stagehands' Ring Cycle is a 1999 documentary film directed by Jon H. Else, that explores the work – and leisure activities – of a crew of stagehands at the San Francisco Opera, as they prepare and rehearse for a production of Richard Wagner's complete Der Ring des Nibelungen (The Ring Cycle). The cycle, a set of four operas with a combined performance time of seventeen hours, is regarded as the most ambitious production an opera company can mount. The film was distributed by the American Public Broadcast Service as part of its Independent Lens series.

== Synopsis ==
The film documents preparations for the production of The Ring Cycle one month prior to opening night, two weeks prior, and on opening night. While the cast and orchestra rehearse their performances, the stagehands (members of IATSE Local #16) rehearse cues for lighting, fog, and the choreographed movement of large set pieces, some requiring twenty people to position – including a two-ton, smoke-belching, articulated dragon head. During scenes, the stagehands relax backstage by playing cards, watching television, and knitting, while occasionally wishing for the cast to "sing faster" so that they can proceed with their work between scenes.

Throughout the film, principal stagehand Ken "Spike" Kirkland provides a synopsis of the operas, with his own commentary. In the film's finale, a sixty-second time-lapse sequence shows the full opening night performance.

== Production ==
The majority of the film was shot on a single 16mm camera, using Fuji 500 ASA film, in a 4:3 aspect ratio. The time-lapse shots were recorded with an Arriflex camera mounted to a rail of the theater balcony. Music from the stage production was paired with the footage of the stagehands' work. Though the footage was shot in 1990, the film was not completed until 1998.

== Release and reception ==
The film was released on January 22, 1999 at the Sundance Film Festival, where it received the Filmmaker’s Trophy. It was later broadcast as part of the first season of the PBS series Independent Lens on September 27, 1999.

In 2000, the film won a News & Documentary Emmy Award "for outstanding informational or cultural programming".

Reviewer Allan Ulrich, writing for The San Francisco Examiner, declared that "one could scarcely imagine a more energizing or enlightening introduction to Wagner's Der Ring des Nibelungen than Jon Else's 60-minute documentary". Oxford University Press called the film "as much fun for opera-haters as for opera-lovers".
