= Business golf =

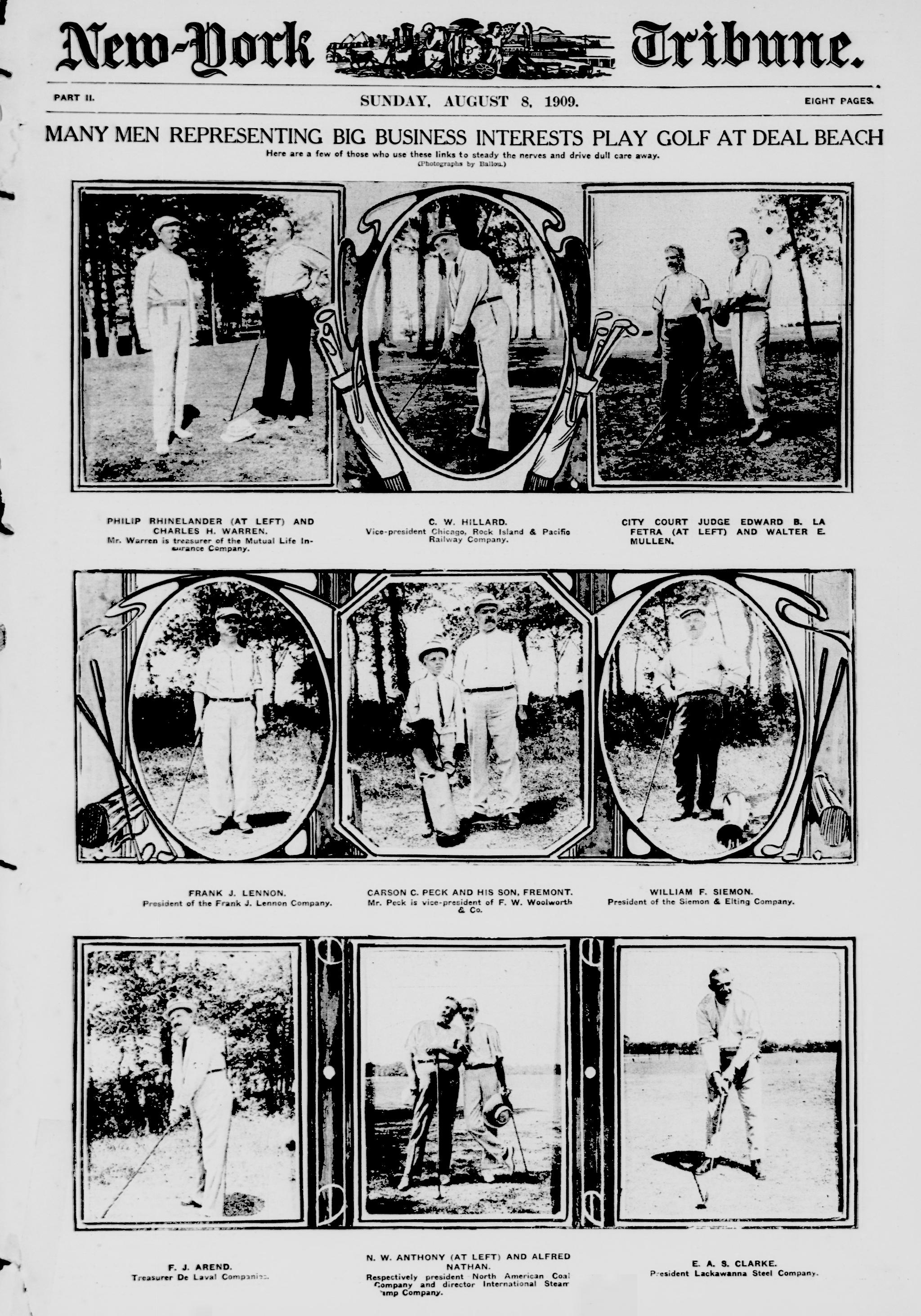

Business golf is the use of golf in business. Typically, the sport is used as a forum for networking and promotional activity.
