= Newfoundpool =

Area of Leicester, England

Coordinates: 52.640°N 1.157°W

Newfoundpool is an area of Leicester lying south of the former Leicester and Swannington Railway.

The land was purchased by market gardener Isaac Harrison in around 1830. Harrison intended to develop the area as a spa, using a spring as the source of water for a Hydrotherapy and bathing establishment, but the venture failed after a few years. Later the building was converted into a residence, Newfoundpool House, in which successive members of the Harrison family lived until 1885, with the land passing to Harrison's nephew, also named Isaac, and then his daughter Beatrice. The house became the Empire Hotel on Fosse Road North.

The area's connection with the Harrison family is commemorated by an acrostic, "IHARRISON", formed by the initial letters of the street names between Pool Road and Beatrice Road.

A Leicester builder, Orson Wright, purchased the land in 1885. Wright laid out roads across the area and sold off the land as building plots. The majority of houses built were of the two-storey terraced type, brick-built, with the corner sites constructed as shops. Along Fosse Road North a number of three- and four-storey red-brick villas were built. Until 1891 Newfoundpool was outside the Borough of Leicester, the border running along Fosse Road North. On the same road the iron-framed parish church of St. Augustine was built in 1888 at a cost of £1,000, and enlarged in 1896 at a cost of £250. The church itself has been abandoned since 2000 and was severely damaged by an arson attack in 2004.

The Newfoundpool School Board was established in 1889 to address the shortage of school places in the area. It estimated that there were 500 children of school age living in Newfoundpool in 1889 and supervised the construction of the Ingle Street Board School (now the building of Inglehurst Junior School) on land purchased on favourable terms from Orson Wright. The Newfoundpool School Board was dissolved in 1891 and incorporated into the Leicester School Board when the Borough boundaries were extended.

The Fosse Cinema on Fosse Road North later became a bingo hall but was demolished to make way for a Tesco Express shop and filling station. https://www.facebook.com/groups/Fossecinema/

Newfoundpool is a part of Fosse Ward and the Leicester West parliamentary constituency.
