= Statue of Liberty, Leicester =

Statue in Leicestershire, England

Statue of Liberty
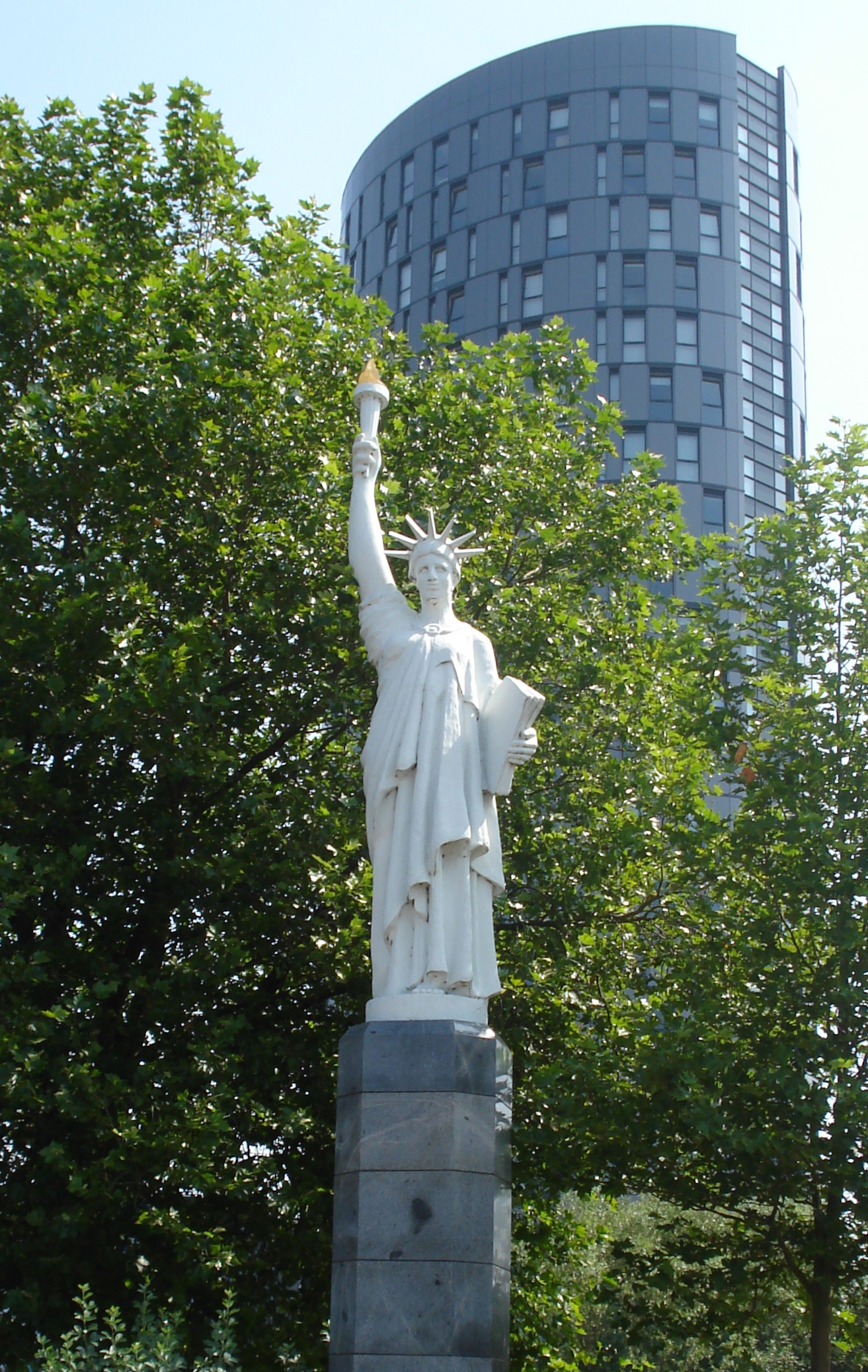
- The statue with The Summit apartments in the background
- Artist: Joseph Morcom
- Location: Soar River bridges, Leicester

The Leicester Statue of Liberty is a small replica of Frédéric Auguste Bartholdi's 1886 Statue of Liberty (Liberty Enlightening the World) by local stonemason Joseph Morcom installed at the twin Soar River bridges in Leicester, England.

== Background ==
The statue was the result of a visit to New York in 1919 by the directors of Lennards "Liberty" shoe factory, and originally stood on top of the shoe factory on the way to Filbert Street. The factory was demolished in 2003, but in 2008 the statue was restored near the original location on the western entrance to the Swan Gyratory, a large roundabout making use of two steel bridges across the Soar on the way to the King Power Stadium.

== See also ==
- Replicas of the Statue of Liberty
