= Statue of Alice Hawkins =

Statue in Leicester, England

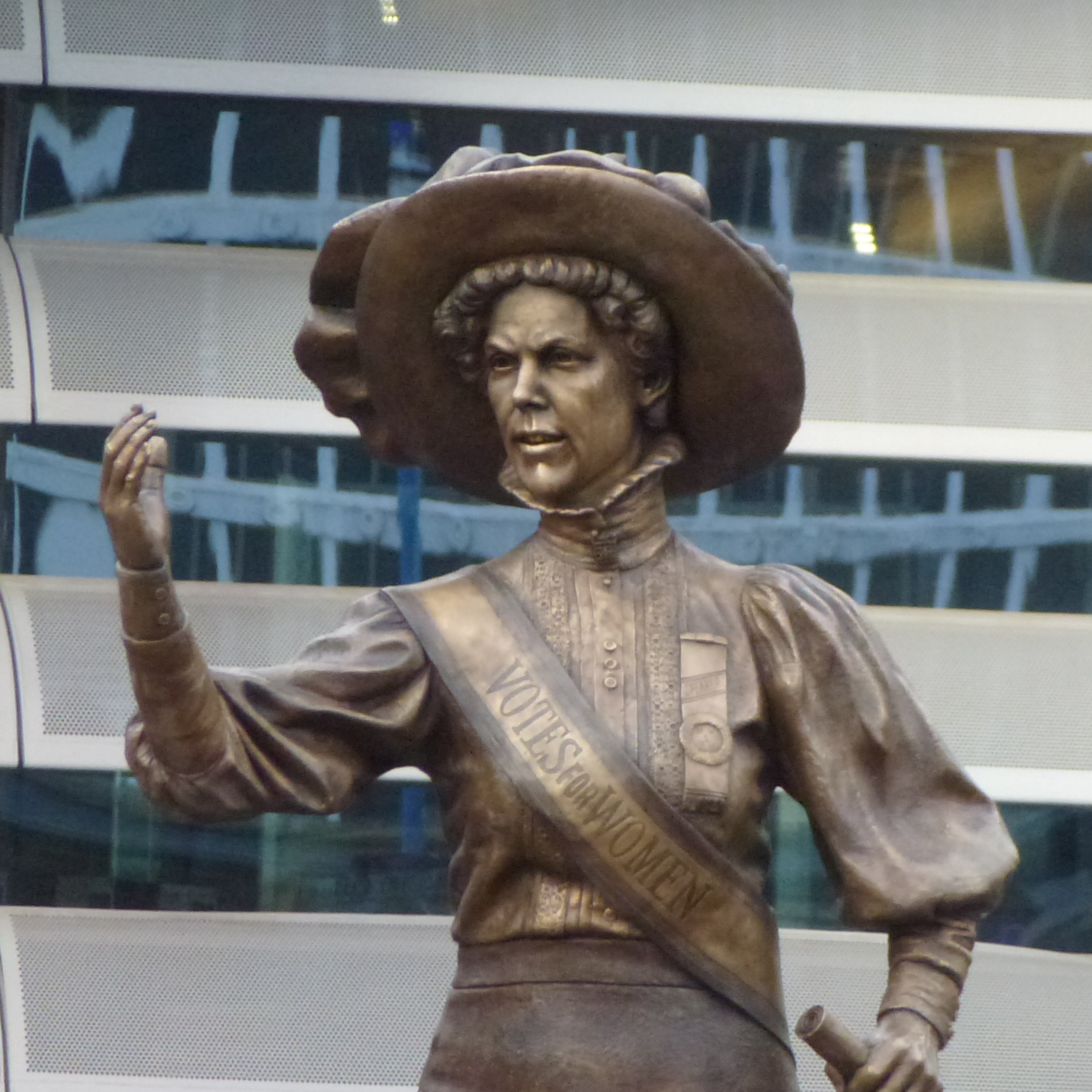
- Artist: Sean Hedges-Quinn
- Year: 2018
- Type: Bronze sculpture
- Dimensions: 2.1 m (7 ft)
- Location: Leicester, England; 52.6345°N 1.1339°W

A statue of suffragette Alice Hawkins is located in Green Dragon Square, Leicester, United Kingdom.

== Description ==
The 7-foot-tall, 800-pound bronze statue was created by sculptor Sean Hedges-Quinn and cast in a foundry in London. It stands on a 4-foot granite plinth and was erected near to the spot Hawkins would have stood when she addressed the public on the topic of women's suffrage. It portrays Hawkins speaking and gesturing with her right arm raised.

== History ==
=== Campaign and funding ===
The statue is the first statue of a named woman in the county of Leicester.

The statue campaign was initiated and led by city Councillor Adam Clarke from 2012. Clarke formed the 'Alice Hawkins Legacy Group' alongside Hawkins' great-grandson Peter Barratt. The group had the sole aim of fundraising for the statue. City Mayor Sir Peter Soulsby committed to the council's funding of a plinth and ongoing maintenance. Funding provided by trade unions supported a design competition that led to the commissioning of sculptor Sean Hedges-Quinn. The statue itself was funded (£62,400) by local businessman Jamie Lewis' charitable fund. Lewis' student accommodation portfolio includes the sensitively converted factory 'Equity Works', where Alice was employed as a shoe machinist.

=== Unveiling ===
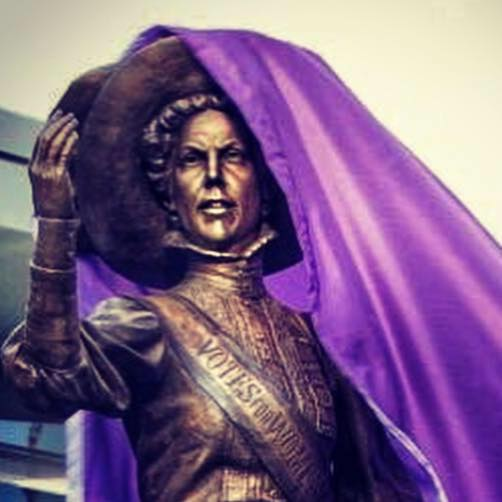
The sculpture in 2018

The statue was unveiled on 4 February 2018, in a ceremony attended by thousands of people, including some of Hawkins' descendants. The unveiling was preceded by a march from Humberstone Gate to the city's new market square. The head of the march included Helen Pankhurst, great-granddaughter of suffragette leader Emmeline Pankhurst. Elaine Pantling, actress and writer of 'Alice in Her Shoes' appeared on the front page of The Guardian and The Scotsman on 5 Feb 2018 leading the march. Images of the unveiling featured in several other national newspapers. The march and unveiling ceremony were covered by BBC, ITV and Sky News and covered live on local radio. Several speakers including Lord Willy Bach (great-nephew of suffragette Emmeline Pankhurst), city mayor Sir Peter Soulsby and Alice's great-grandson Peter Barratt addressed the crowds. The DMU Gospel Choir sang 'Rise Up'. The Statue was unveiled by Alice's great great-granddaughter Kate Barratt, health campaigner Alice Gibbs, Cllr Manjula Sood MBE and Liz Kendall MP. TV and radio arts and news broadcaster Geeta Pendse hosted the ceremony.

The statue was unveiled in the week prior to the centenary of the royal assent of the Representation of the People Act 1918, and was the first of several statues across England to be unveiled during the centenary year.

== See also ==
- List of monuments and memorials to women's suffrage
