= 12 Monkeys =

1995 film by Terry Gilliam

- Theatrical release poster
- Directed by: Terry Gilliam
- Screenplay by: David Peoples; Janet Peoples
- Based on: La Jetée by Chris Marker
- Produced by: Charles Roven
- Starring: Bruce Willis; Madeleine Stowe; Brad Pitt
- Cinematography: Roger Pratt
- Edited by: Mick Audsley
- Music by: Paul Buckmaster
- Production companies: Atlas Entertainment; Classico Entertainment
- Distributed by: Universal Pictures
- Release dates: December 8, 1995 (New York City); December 29, 1995 (United States)
- Running time: 129 minutes
- Countries: France; Germany; Japan; United Kingdom; United States
- Language: English
- Budget: $29 million
- Box office: $168.8 million

12 Monkeys is a 1995 science fiction thriller film directed by Terry Gilliam from a screenplay by David Peoples and Janet Peoples, based on Chris Marker's 1962 short film La Jetée. The film stars Bruce Willis, Madeleine Stowe, Brad Pitt, and Christopher Plummer. Set in a post-apocalyptic future devastated by disease, its plot follows a convict who is sent back in time to gather information about the man-made virus that wiped out most of the human population on the planet. It is an international co-production between the United Kingdom, France, Japan, the United States and Germany.

12 Monkeys premiered in New York City on December 8, 1995, and was released in the United States by Universal Pictures on December 29, 1995. The film received positive reviews from critics and grossed over $168.8 million worldwide against a $29 million budget. At the 68th Academy Awards, the film was nominated for Best Supporting Actor (for Pitt) and Best Costume Design. It garnered seven nominations at the 22nd Saturn Awards, winning three: Best Science Fiction Film, Best Supporting Actor, and Best Costumes. Pitt also won Best Supporting Actor at the 53rd Golden Globe Awards.

== Plot ==
In 2035, James Cole is imprisoned beneath the ruins of Philadelphia after a virus kills 99% of humanity, forcing the survivors underground. In exchange for a pardon, Cole is selected by scientists to travel approximately 39 years into the past to investigate the virus, believed to have been released by a group known as "the Army of the Twelve Monkeys", in the hope of developing a cure. Cole also experiences recurring dreams of a man being shot at an airport terminal.

Instead of arriving in late 1996 as planned, Cole is sent to Baltimore in April 1990, where he is committed to a psychiatric hospital under the care of Dr. Kathryn Railly. There, he encounters fellow patient Jeffrey Goines, an erratic critic of consumerism. Cole attempts to convince the hospital doctors of his mission and contact the scientists using a telephone number they provided, but both efforts fail. Following an unsuccessful escape attempt with Jeffrey's assistance, Cole is abruptly returned to the future. A second attempt to reach 1996 briefly sends him to a World War I battlefield, where he encounters fellow prisoner José and is shot in the leg.

In 1996, Railly gives a public lecture on the Cassandra complex and encounters Dr. Peters, who expresses concern about humanity's environmental impact. After the event, Railly is kidnapped by Cole, who forces her to drive him to Philadelphia. Railly reluctantly accompanies Cole and removes the bullet from his leg. Meanwhile, her disappearance makes Cole a wanted man. Their investigation leads them to Jeffrey, whom they discover is the leader of the Army of the Twelve Monkeys and the son of renowned virologist Dr. Leland Goines.

Shortly before police can apprehend Cole, he is abruptly returned to the future. Railly discovers that the bullet removed from Cole's leg predates the 1920s and subsequently identifies him in a World War I photograph. Believing his account, she contacts Goines and warns him to prevent Jeffrey from accessing his laboratory. This prompts Goines to discuss increased security measures with his assistant, who is revealed to be Peters. Meanwhile, Cole reaffirms his commitment to the mission and persuades the scientists to send him back to 1996.

Upon reuniting with Railly, Cole initially dismisses his memories of the future as delusions and expresses his desire to remain in the past with her. To test his claims, Railly leaves a voicemail message at the number Cole recalls being given by the scientists. Cole recognizes it as a distorted recording previously played to him in the future, confirming that the pandemic is inevitable. To evade police, the two disguise themselves and decide to spend their remaining time together in the Florida Keys. On their way to the airport, they discover that the Army of the Twelve Monkeys is actually an animal rights organization and that its graffiti reading "we did it" refers to the release of animals from the Philadelphia Zoo, rather than the virus.

At the airport, Cole leaves a final message for the scientists explaining that the Army was a false lead and that he will not return to the future. José then appears and gives Cole a handgun, instructing him to complete his mission and threatening to harm Railly if he refuses. Meanwhile, Railly spots Peters preparing to board a flight and realizes that his planned international itinerary corresponds to the locations of the initial viral outbreaks. She alerts Cole, who attempts to stop Peters but is shot by airport security. As Cole dies in Railly's arms, she makes eye contact with a young boy who witnesses the shooting, revealed to be Cole as a child. Peters boards his flight carrying the virus and takes a seat beside Jones, an astrophysicist who oversees Cole's mission in the future. She identifies herself as working in "insurance". Outside the airport, the young Cole watches an airplane take off.

== Cast ==
- Bruce Willis as James Cole
  - Joseph Melito as young James Cole
- Madeleine Stowe as Dr. Kathryn Railly
- Brad Pitt as Jeffrey Goines
- Christopher Plummer as Dr. Leland Goines
- Frank Gorshin as Dr. Fletcher
- Jon Seda as Jose
- Ernest Abuba as Engineer
- Bill Raymond as Microbiologist
- Simon Jones as Zoologist
- Bob Adrian as Geologist
- Carol Florence as Astrophysicist/Jones
- H. Michael Walls as Botanist
- David Morse as Dr. Peters
- Christopher Meloni as Lt. Halperin
- Vernon Campbell as Tiny
- Lisa Gay Hamilton as Teddy
- Matt Ross as Bee
- Felix Pire as Fale
- Annie Golden as Woman Cabbie
- Korstia Korchenko as Thug #1
- Chuck Jeffreys as Thug #2
- Thomas Roy as a street preacher

== Production ==
=== Development ===
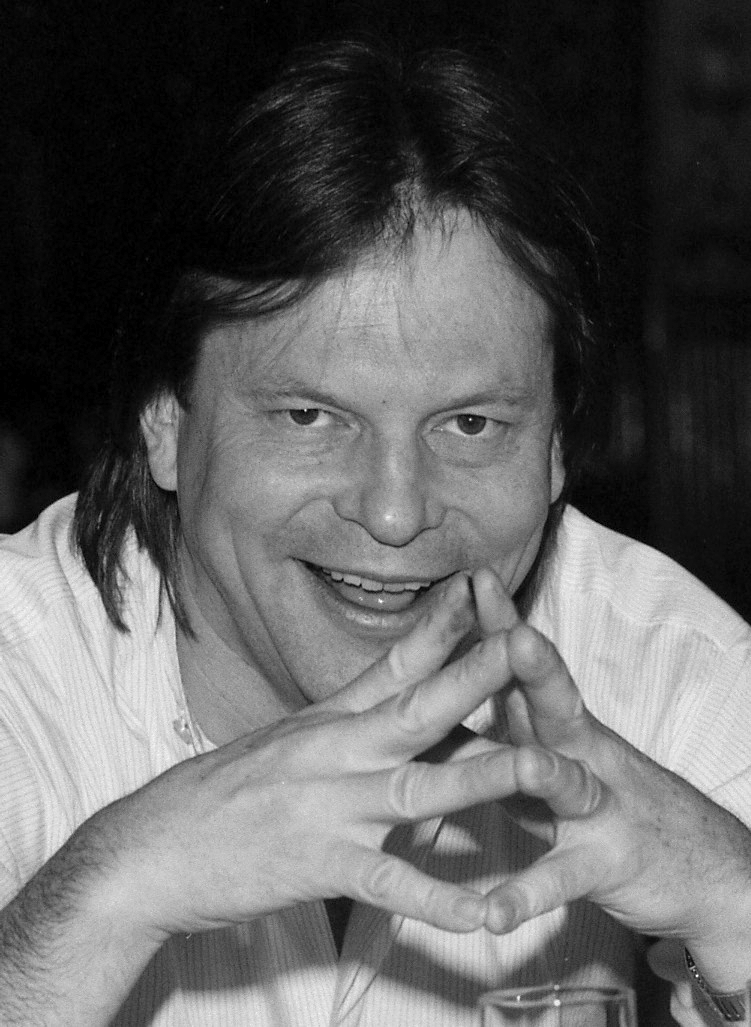
12 Monkeys was directed by Terry Gilliam.

The genesis of 12 Monkeys came from executive producer Robert Kosberg, who had been a fan of the French short film La Jetée (1962). Kosberg persuaded that film's director, Chris Marker, to let him pitch the project to Universal Pictures, seeing it as a perfect basis for a full-length science fiction film. Universal agreed to purchase the remake rights and hired David and Janet Peoples to write the screenplay. Producer Charles Roven chose Terry Gilliam to direct, because he believed the filmmaker's style was perfect for 12 Monkeys' nonlinear storyline and time travel subplot. Gilliam had just abandoned a film adaptation of A Tale of Two Cities when he signed to direct 12 Monkeys, though Gilliam felt the script was "too complex" to take on.

The film represents the second film for which Gilliam did not write or co-write the screenplay. Although he prefers to direct his own scripts, he was captivated by Peoples' "intriguing and intelligent script. The story is disconcerting. It deals with time, madness and a perception of what the world is or isn't. It is a study of madness and dreams, of death and re-birth, set in a world coming apart".

Universal took longer than expected to approve 12 Monkeys, although Gilliam had two stars (Willis and Pitt) and a firm budget of $29.5 million (low for a Hollywood science fiction film). Universal's production of Waterworld (1995) had resulted in various cost overruns. To get 12 Monkeys approved for production, Gilliam persuaded Willis to lower his normal asking price. Because of Universal's strict production incentives and his history with the studio on Brazil, Gilliam received final cut privilege. The Writers Guild of America was skeptical of the "inspired by" credit for La Jetée and Chris Marker. Gilliam said that he had not seen La Jetée when he made 12 Monkeys. In 2003, Marker said he felt the film was "magnificent".

=== Casting ===
Gilliam's initial casting choices were Nick Nolte as James Cole and Jeff Bridges as Jeffrey Goines, but Universal objected. Other actors were suggested for the roles included Nicolas Cage and Tom Cruise, but Gilliam rejected the choices. Gilliam, who first met Bruce Willis while casting Jeff Bridges' role in The Fisher King (1991), believed Willis evoked Cole's characterization as being "somebody who is strong and dangerous but also vulnerable". Gilliam later stated that he wasn't originally interested in casting Willis because of the actor's mouth.

Gilliam cast Madeleine Stowe as Dr. Kathryn Railly because he was impressed by her performance in Blink (1994). The director first met Stowe when he was casting his abandoned film adaptation of A Tale of Two Cities. "She has this incredible ethereal beauty and she's incredibly intelligent", Gilliam said of Stowe. "Those two things rest very easily with her, and the film needed those elements because it has to be romantic."

Gilliam originally believed that Pitt was not right for the role of Jeffrey Goines, but the casting director convinced him otherwise. Pitt was cast for a comparatively small salary, as he was still relatively unknown at the time. By the time of 12 Monkeys' release, Interview with the Vampire (1994), Legends of the Fall (1994), and Se7en (1995) had been released, making Pitt an A-list actor, which drew greater attention to the film and boosted its box-office standing. In Philadelphia, months before filming, Pitt spent weeks at Temple University's hospital, visiting and studying the psychiatric ward to prepare for his role.

=== Filming ===
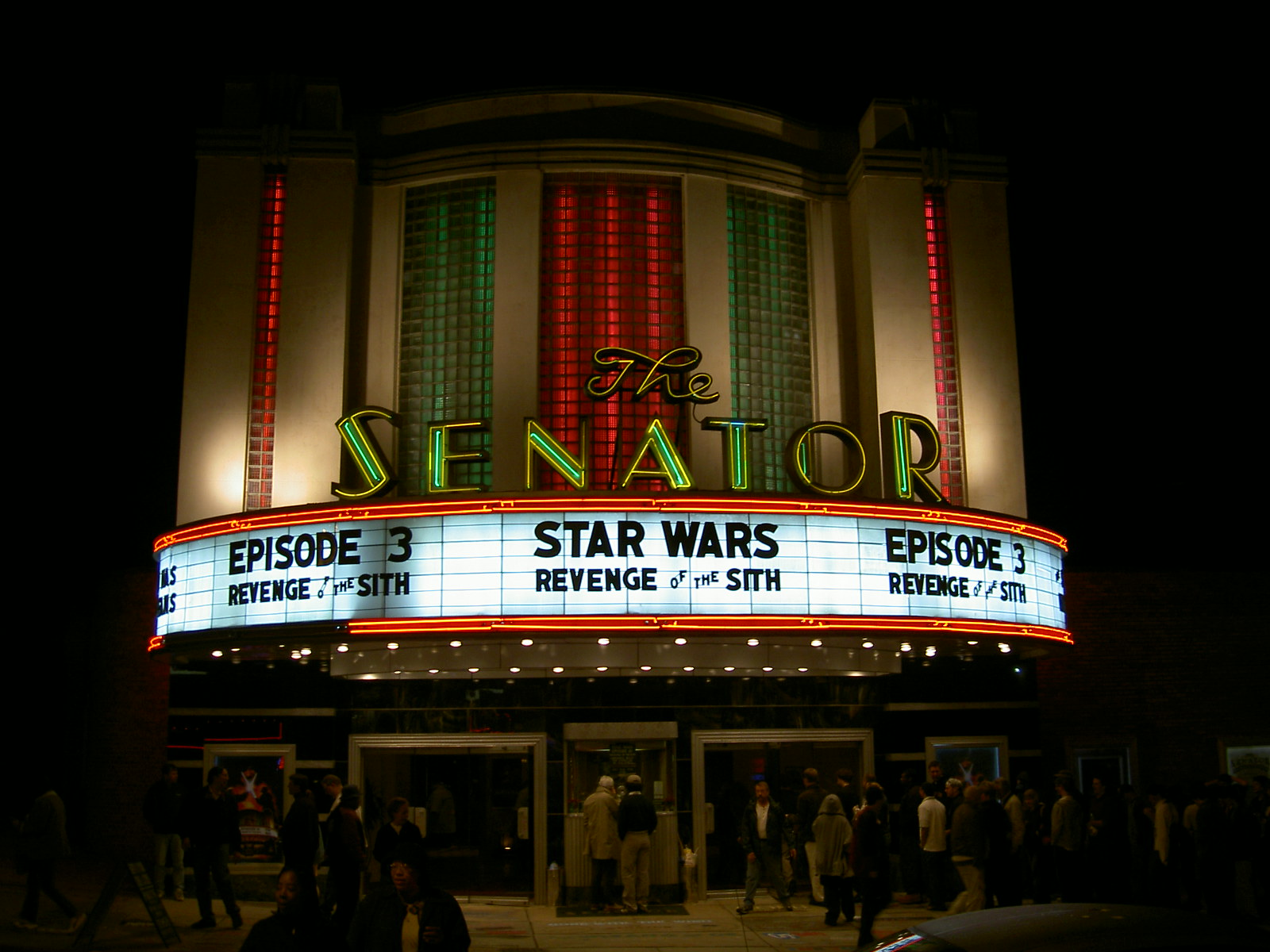
The Senator Theatre was used as a filming location.

Principal photography lasted from February 8 to May 6, 1995. Shooting on location in Philadelphia and Baltimore (including the Senator Theatre) in winter was fraught with weather problems. There were also technical glitches with the futuristic mechanical props. Because the film has a nonlinear storyline, continuity errors occurred, and some scenes had to be reshot. Gilliam also injured himself when he went horseback riding. Despite setbacks, the director managed to stay within the budget and was only a week behind his shooting schedule. "It was a tough shoot", acknowledged Jeffrey Beecroft, the film's production designer. "There wasn't a lot of money or enough time. Terry is a perfectionist, but he was really adamant about not going over budget. He got crucified for Munchausen, and that still haunts him."

The filmmakers were not allowed access to sound stages; thus, they had to find abandoned buildings or landmarks to use. The exteriors of the climactic airport scene were shot at the Baltimore/Washington International Airport, while the interior scenes were shot at the Pennsylvania Convention Center (formerly Reading Terminal). Filming at the psychiatric hospital was done at the Eastern State Penitentiary and Girard College. Some shots took place in abandoned motels in Camden, New Jersey. 12 Monkeys was shot in the 1.85:1 format rather than anamorphic.

=== Design ===
Gilliam used the same filmmaking style as he had in Brazil (1985), including the art direction and cinematography (specifically using Fresnel lenses). The appearance of the interrogation room where Cole is being interviewed by the scientists was based on the work of Lebbeus Woods; these scenes were shot at three power stations (two in Philadelphia and one in Baltimore). Gilliam intended to show Cole being interviewed through a multi-screen interrogation TV set because he felt the machinery evoked a "nightmarish intervention of technology. You try to see the faces on the screens in front of you, but the real faces and voices are down there and you have these tiny voices in your ear. To me that's the world we live in, the way we communicate these days, through technical devices that pretend to be about communication but may not be".

The art department made sure that the 2035 underground world only used pre-1996 technology, to depict the bleakness of the future. Gilliam, Beecroft and set decorator Crispian Sallis went to several flea markets and salvage warehouses looking for materials to decorate the sets. The majority of visual effects sequences were created by Peerless Camera Company, which Gilliam founded in the late 1970s with Kent Houston, the film's visual effects supervisor. Additional digital compositing was done by The Mill, while Cinesite provided film scanning services.

== Music ==
The film's score was composed, arranged, and conducted by English musician Paul Buckmaster. The main theme is based on Argentine tango musician/composer Astor Piazzolla's Suite Punta del Este.

== Themes ==
=== Thematic elements ===
Cole has been thrust from another world into ours and he's confronted by the confusion we live in, which most people somehow accept as normal. So he appears abnormal, and what's happening around him seems random and weird. Is he mad or are we?

— Director Terry Gilliam

In the biographical novel Gilliam on Gilliam, director Terry Gilliam described the film as "very much about the twentieth century's inundation of information and about deciphering what among all this noise and imagery is useful and important to our lives"; these themes are expressed in conflicts between the protagonist and antagonistic elements in the relative 'past' and 'future'.

References to time, time travel, and monkeys are scattered throughout the film, including the Woody Woodpecker cartoon, Time Tunnel (1969), playing on the TV in a hotel room, the Marx Brothers film Monkey Business (1931) on TV in the asylum, and the subplots involving monkeys (drug testing, news stories and animal rights).

=== Allusions to other films and media ===
12 Monkeys is inspired by the French short film La Jetée (1962); as in La Jetée, characters are haunted by the images of their own deaths. Like La Jetée, 12 Monkeys contains references to Alfred Hitchcock's Vertigo (1958). Toward the end of the film, Cole and Railly hide in a theater showing a 24-hour Hitchcock marathon and watch scenes from Vertigo and The Birds. Railly then transforms herself with a blonde wig, as Judy (Kim Novak) transforms herself into blonde Madeleine in Vertigo; Cole sees her emerge within a red light, as Scottie (James Stewart) saw Judy emerge within a green light. Brief notes of Bernard Herrmann's film score can also be heard. Railly also wears the same coat Novak wore in the first part of Vertigo. The scene at Muir Woods National Monument, where Judy (as Madeleine) looks at the growth rings of a felled redwood and traces back events in her past life, resonates with larger themes in 12 Monkeys. Cole and Railly later have a similar conversation while the same music from Vertigo is repeated. The Muir Woods scene in Vertigo is also reenacted in La Jetée. In a previous scene in the film, Cole wakes up in a hospital bed with the scientists talking to him in chorus. This is a direct homage to the "Dry Bones" scene in Dennis Potter's The Singing Detective. James Cole is a notable Christ figure in the film. The film is significant in the genre of science-fiction film noir, and it alludes to various "canonical noir" films.

== Release ==
=== Theatrical ===
In the United States, 12 Monkeys received a limited theatrical release on December 29, 1995, followed by a wide release on January 5, 1996.

=== Home media ===
Universal Pictures released 12 Monkeys on VHS on January 28, 1997. It was also released on a "Signature Collection" LaserDisc of the film on February 18, 1997, containing an audio commentary by director Terry Gilliam and producer Charles Roven, The Hamster Factor and Other Tales of Twelve Monkeys (a making-of documentary), an archive of production art, and production notes. It was first released on DVD on March 31, 1998, containing the same extras as the LaserDisc. It was re-released as a Special Edition DVD on May 10, 2005, with a new transfer of the film and identical extras. It was also released on HD DVD on March 4, 2008, with the same extras. It was released on Blu-ray Disc on July 28, 2009, with the same extras. Arrow Films released a new Blu-ray of the film on October 15, 2018, containing a new transfer of the film, remastered in 4K from the original negative, all of the previous extras, as well as a vintage 1996 interview with Terry Gilliam, and an interview with Gilliam scholar Ian Christie.

=== Lebbeus Woods lawsuit ===
Throughout the film, Cole is brought into an interrogation room and told to sit in a chair attached to a vertical rail on the wall. A spherical machine with screens of varying sizes showing close-ups of the faces of the scientists interrogating Cole, supported by a metal armature is suspended directly in front of him, probing for weaknesses as the inquisitors interrogate him. Architect Lebbeus Woods filed a lawsuit against Universal in February 1996, claiming that his work "Neomechanical Tower (Upper) Chamber" was used without permission. Woods won his lawsuit, requiring Universal to remove the scenes, but he ultimately allowed their inclusion in exchange for a "high six-figure cash settlement" from Universal.

=== Trilogy claims ===
After the release of The Zero Theorem in 2013, claims were made that Gilliam had meant it as part of a trilogy. A 2013 review for The Guardian said, "Calling it [The Zero Theorem] the third part of a trilogy formed by earlier dystopian satires Brazil and Twelve Monkeys [sic]"; but in an interview with Alex Suskind for Indiewire in late 2014, Gilliam said, "Well, it's funny, this trilogy was never something I ever said, but it's been repeated so often it's clearly true [laughs]. I don't know who started it but once it started it never stopped".

== Reception ==
=== Box office ===
12 Monkeys grossed $57.14 million in the United States and Canada and $111.69 million in other territories, for a worldwide total of $168.83 million. The film topped the U.S. box office for two consecutive weeks following its wide release before falling from the No. 1 position amid competition from From Dusk till Dawn, Mr. Holland's Opus, and Black Sheep.

=== Critical response ===
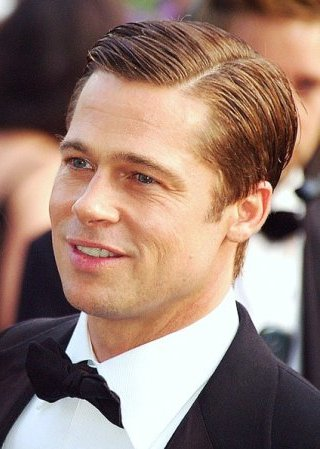
Brad Pitt received critical acclaim and his first Academy Award nomination.

On the review aggregator website Rotten Tomatoes, 88% of 73 critics' reviews are positive, with an average rating of 7.6/10. The website's consensus reads: "The plot's a bit of a jumble, but excellent performances and mind-blowing plot twists make 12 Monkeys a kooky, effective experience." Metacritic, which uses a weighted average, assigned the film a score of 75 out of 100, based on 20 critics, indicating "generally favorable" reviews. Audiences polled by CinemaScore gave the film an average grade of "B" on an A+ to F scale.

The film's startling depiction of the world in 2035—where human life has been driven underground by a 1990s viral outbreak that annihilated 99% of human life—may not always make sense. But 12 Monkeys rattles with insightful sound and fury, and its bleak visions are hard to shake.

— Peter Stack, writing for the San Francisco Chronicle

Roger Ebert found 12 Monkeys' depiction of the future similar to Blade Runner (1982, also scripted by David Peoples) and Brazil (1985, also directed by Terry Gilliam). "The film is a celebration of madness and doom, with a hero who tries to prevail against the chaos of his condition, and is inadequate", Ebert wrote. "This vision is a cold, dark, damp one, and even the romance between Willis and Stowe feels desperate rather than joyous. All of this is done very well, and the more you know about movies (especially the technical side), the more you're likely to admire it. [...] And as entertainment, it appeals more to the mind than to the senses."

Janet Maslin of The New York Times stated, "This apocalyptic nightmare, a vigorous work of dark, surprise-filled science fiction, is much tougher and less fanciful than the director's films have often been. [...] 12 Monkeys is fierce and disturbing, with a plot that skillfully resists following any familiar course. The film's hero fears that he's half-crazy, and for two hours Mr. Gilliam artfully keeps his audience feeling the same way." Desson Thomson of The Washington Post praised the art direction and set design. "Willis and Pitt's performances, Gilliam's atmospherics and an exhilarating momentum easily outweigh such trifling flaws in the script", Thomson wrote. Peter Travers from Rolling Stone magazine attributes the film's success to Gilliam's direction and Willis' performance. Internet reviewer James Berardinelli believed the filmmakers had an intelligent and creative motive for the time-travel subplot. Rather than being sent to change the past, James Cole is instead observing it to make a better future. Richard Corliss of Time magazine felt the film's time-travel aspect and apocalyptic depiction of a bleak future were clichés. "In its frantic mix of chaos, carnage and zoo animals, 12 Monkeys is Jumanji for adults", Corliss wrote.

== Accolades ==
Brad Pitt was nominated for the Academy Award for Best Supporting Actor, but lost to Kevin Spacey for The Usual Suspects. Julie Weiss was also nominated for the Academy Award for Best Costume Design, but lost to James Acheson for Restoration. However, Pitt won the Golden Globe Award for Best Supporting Actor in a Motion Picture. Terry Gilliam was honored for his direction at the 46th Berlin International Film Festival.

The film also received positive notices from the science fiction community. It was nominated for the Hugo Award for Best Dramatic Presentation and the Academy of Science Fiction, Fantasy and Horror Films awarded it the Saturn Award for Best Science Fiction Film at the 22nd Saturn Awards. Pitt and Weiss won awards at the ceremony as well; Gilliam, Bruce Willis, Madeleine Stowe, and writers David and Janet Peoples also received nominations.

== Television series ==
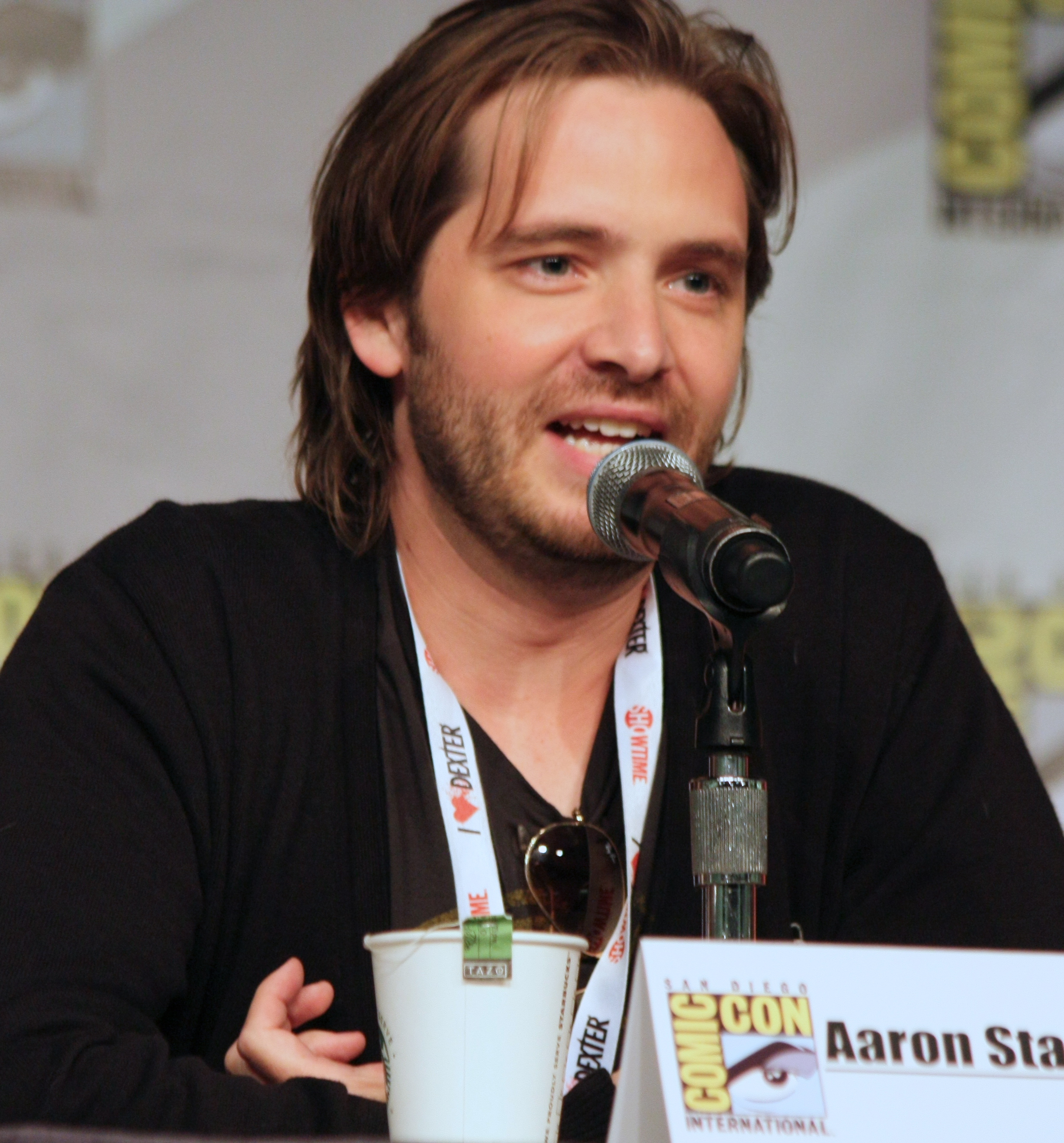
Actor Aaron Stanford, who portrays James Cole in the television adaptation

On August 26, 2013, Entertainment Weekly announced that Syfy was developing a 12 Monkeys television series based on the film. Production began in November 2013. The pilot was written by Terry Matalas and Travis Fickett, who had previously written for the series Terra Nova. Due to the series being labeled as "cast contingent", the series did not move forward until the roles of Cole and Goines were cast. In April 2014, Syfy green-lit the first season, which consisted of 13 episodes, including the pilot filmed in 2013. The series premiered on January 16, 2015. On March 12, 2015, the series was renewed for a second season that began airing in April 2016. Actress Madeleine Stowe made an appearance in one Season 2 episode, being the only cast member of the film to appear on the series. On June 29, 2016, the series was renewed for a 10-episode third season, set to premiere in 2017. The third season aired over three consecutive nights, from May 19 to May 21, 2017. A fourth and final season was announced on March 16, 2017. The eleven-episode fourth season ran from June 15 to July 6, 2018.
