= Jon H. Else =

American documentary filmmaker (born 1944)

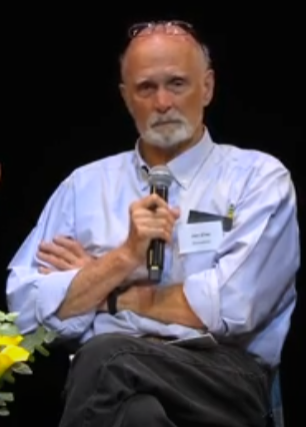
- Born: June 16, 1944 (age 82); Worcester, Massachusetts, U.S.
- Education: UC Berkeley
- Occupation: Filmmaker

Jon H. Else (born 1944) is an American documentary filmmaker and professor at the UC Berkeley Graduate School of Journalism. He directs the documentary program.

== Biography ==
Born in Worcester, Massachusetts, Else moved west for college. He earned a B.A. (English, 1968) from the University of California, Berkeley, and an M.A. (Communication, 1974) from Stanford University.

He directed and produced major documentaries beginning in 1980, such as The Day After Trinity, about the work during World War II at Los Alamos in developing and testing the atomic bomb and Eyes on the Prize in 1987, a documentary about the civil rights movement from 1954 to 1965, based on the history of the same name. He was awarded a MacArthur Fellowship in 1988.

He created additional documentaries on a wide variety of subjects, as well as working as a writer or cinematographer on Emmy Award-winning works.

== Awards ==
- 1981 Academy Award Nominee Best Documentary Feature - The Day After Trinity
- 1988 MacArthur Fellows Program
- 1989 Emmy - Yosemite: The Fate Of Heaven, director
- 1993 Emmy - The Great Depression, writer
- 1998 Emmy - America's Endangered Species: Don't Say Good-bye, cinematographer
- 1999 Emmy - Sing Faster: The Stagehands' Ring Cycle
- 1999 Sundance Filmmaker's Trophy - Sing Faster: The Stagehands' Ring Cycle

== Filmography ==
- The Day After Trinity: J. Robert Oppenheimer and the Atomic Bomb (1980)
- Palace Of Delights: The Exploratorium (1982, aired on Nova), producer, director, cinematographer
- Eyes On The Prize: America's Civil Rights Years (1987, covering 1954–1965), series producer for PBS and cinematographer
- Yosemite: The Fate Of Heaven (1989, aired in American Experience (season 2)), producer, director, cinematographer
- Eyes on the Prize II: America at the Racial Crossroads 1965–1985 (1990), series producer and cinematographer.
- Wonders Are Many: The Making of Doctor Atomic (2008)
- Cadillac Desert: Water and the American West (1997), director, producer, cinematographer
- Sing Faster: The Stagehands' Ring Cycle (1999), producer, director, cinematographer
- Open Outcry (2001), producer, director, cinematographer
- The Island President (2011), executive producer
