= Leicester Market =

Ancient market of the city of Leicester, England

Coordinates: 52°38′5.2″N 1°7′59.0″W

Map of central Leicester showing the location of Leicester Market (marked in green) among the key sites of Leicester Old Town. The Roman and medieval walls are marked by the dotted line. The churches are marked in red, the dissolved monasteries in black, secular sites in blue, and the one surviving Roman ruin in purple.

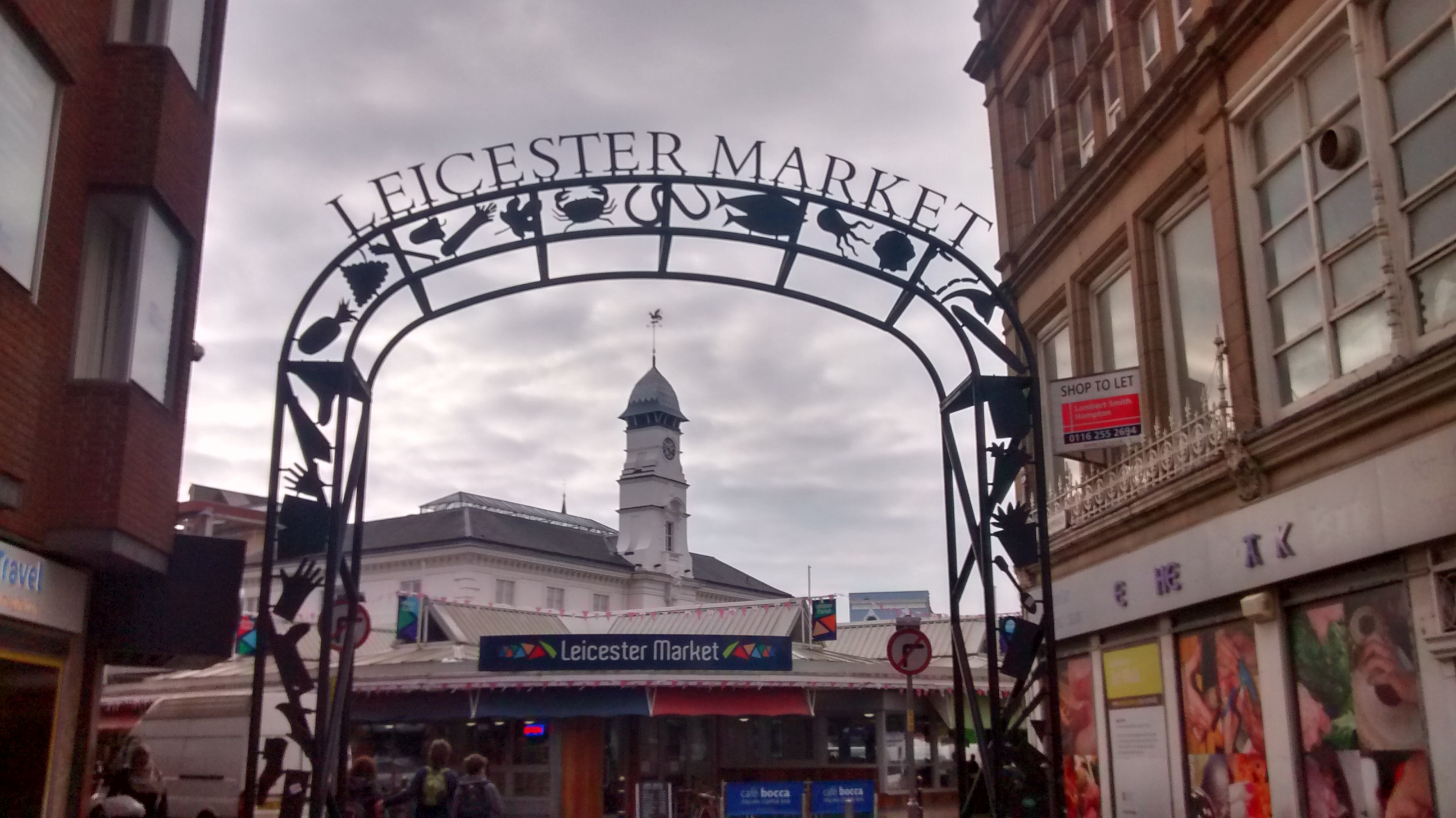
Leicester Market

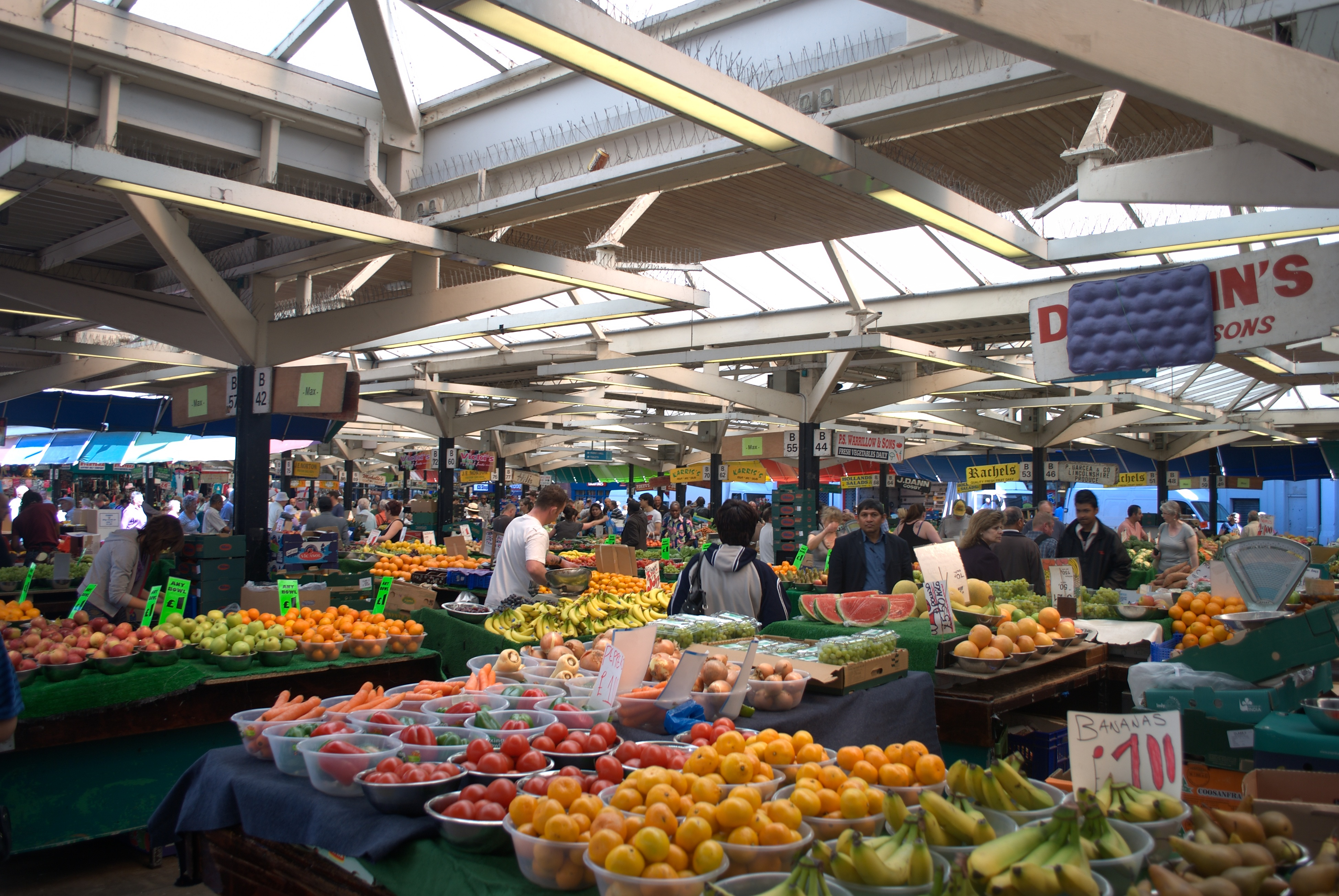
Stalls in Leicester Market selling fruit and vegetables

Leicester Market is a market in The City of Leicester, England, on Market Place just south of the clock tower. It is around 800 years old and was moved to the current site around 700 years ago. It is the largest outdoor covered market in Europe.

It is open Monday to Saturday 9 am– 6 pm and has over 10 to 15 stalls. The outdoor market sells a wide variety of goods, particularly fruit and vegetables, but also flowers, clothes, second-hand-books, bric-a-brac and jewellery. It also has a number of permanent units, containing clothes, cosmetics, fabrics, greetings cards, a cafe and pet products.

The former indoor market, built in 1973, was a multi-level building containing the fish market and delicatessen, as well as stalls selling clothes, haberdashery, footwear, jewellery, gemstones, and confectionery. It was demolished between December 2014 /June 2015 and the levelled site turned into New Market Square. The traders who were based there either moved to the new Food Hall - built adjacent to The Corn Exchange as a partial replacement and opened in April 2014 – or to stalls on the Outdoor Market.

In the centre of the market stands the Leicester Corn Exchange (1850), originally built as a trading centre, but now serving as a bar and restaurant. A statue of John Manners, 5th Duke of Rutland stands close to the Corn Exchange.

A monthly Farmers' Market is held nearby on Gallowtree Gate on the last Wednesday of every month, specializing in locally produced organic meat, fruit and vegetables.

== History ==
Sound recording of Leicester Market on a Saturday afternoon

The market is protected by a Royal Charter that goes back to its origin over 700 years ago. This prohibits other markets from operating within a specified distance (6 2/3 miles) of the Leicester market.

In recent years the City Council which holds the Royal Charter has begun to allow some other markets within the City. In 2009 the City Council proposed to grant a licence to a private market promoter to operate a Sunday Market at the Walkers Stadium.
