= List of 12 Monkeys episodes =

12 Monkeys is an American television series on Syfy created by Terry Matalas and Travis Fickett. It is a science fiction mystery drama based on the 1995 12 Monkeys film, written by David Peoples and Janet Peoples and directed by Terry Gilliam, which itself was based on Chris Marker's 1962 short film La Jetée. The series aired between January 16, 2015, and July 6, 2018.

During the course of the series, 47 episodes of 12 Monkeys aired over four seasons.

== Series overview ==
Season	Episodes	Originally released	
Season	Episodes	First released	Last released
1	13	January 16, 2015	April 10, 2015
2	13	April 18, 2016	July 18, 2016
3	10	May 19, 2017	May 21, 2017
4	11	June 15, 2018	July 6, 2018

== Episodes ==
=== Season 1 (2015) ===
No. overall	No. in season	Title	Directed by	Written by	Original release date	US viewers (millions)
1	1	"Splinter"	Jeffrey Reiner	Teleplay by : Terry Matalas & Travis Fickett	January 16, 2015	1.353
In 2043, scientists led by Katarina Jones complete a Project Splinter time machine to stop an apocalyptic plague before it happens. Their best lead is a corrupted 2017 recording from virologist Cassandra "Cassie" Railly which identifies Leland Frost with the plague's origins and prophetically asks for James Cole, whom Jones recruits as a chrononaut. Cole questions Cassie in 2013, proving he is a time traveller by causing a scratch to appear on a future version of her watch, but she does not yet know about Frost. Cassie investigates on her own, and, when they meet again in 2015, she has identified Frost as Markridge Group CEO Leland Goines who is working on biological weapons. Cole fails to assassinate Goines, and they are captured. Goines realizes that Cole is a time traveller he met in 1987 when Cole was looking for the Army of the 12 Monkeys. Knowing he will survive to do this, Cole puts the two versions of Cassie's watch together, creating an explosive paradox. He kills Goines but it does not rewrite the post-apocalyptic future. Elsewhere, psychiatric patient Jennifer Goines inherits her father's fortunes and is shown drawing the monkey logo.
2	2	"Mentally Divergent"	David Grossman	Natalie Chaidez	January 23, 2015	1.104
Cole is directed to find information about a patient in a Philadelphia mental institution who is somehow linked to the Army of the 12 Monkeys. The scientists attempt to send him to 2015, but he finds himself in North Korea in 2006. An interrogator finds his note with the institution's address. After being redirected to 2015, Cole finds the mentally unstable Jennifer Goines in the institution. Cassie gets Aaron Marker to take her to her parents' old bookstore to hide and tells him there is a cover-up about Leland Goines's death. Aaron tells her of intelligence that Cole was in North Korea in 2006 and gives her the address from Cole's note. At the institution Jennifer tells Cole that she worked for her father and is one of only two people left who know the location of his secret laboratory, the Night Room. Just as Cassie arrives at the institution to get Cole, a mysterious pallid man with a scar arrives and kidnaps Jennifer. He is revealed to be the man who killed Jennifer's two coworkers at her father's lab (leading to her mental breakdown) and Cassie's ex-NSA contact Jeremy.
3	3	"Cassandra Complex"	Michael Waxman	Rebecca Kirsch	January 30, 2015	0.903
Cole and Cassie attempt to track down Henri Toussaint, the only person besides Jennifer to know where the Night Room is. They discover he was murdered by an unknown assailant while working with Cassie to contain an epidemic in Haiti in 2014. Cole is sent back to 2014 Haiti, where he locates Henri, but the Pallid Man catches up to them. The 2014 Cassie—paranoid that the Haitian outbreak is the 2017 plague—has a breakdown and is relieved of duty. Cole helps Henri escape the Pallid Man, and Henri tells him how to find the Night Room. The Haitian epidemic turns out not to be the plague, and Cole rejoins Cassie in 2015. Cassie takes a job at the CDC to gather further information on the Night Room. It is revealed (though not to Cassie) that Cole murdered Henri to stop the Army from interrogating him. In 2043, Ramse encounters Max, a woman he knew from when he and Cole were members of a group called the West VII. He is suspicious of her claim that she has left the West VII but lets her go. She reports to Deacon, leader of the West VII, that she has found Cole.
4	4	"Atari"	David Grossman	Terry Matalas & Travis Fickett	February 6, 2015	0.731
In 2043, the West VII assault the temporal facility where the time machine is housed, entering through a hidden tunnel. Ramse and Jones are apparently killed but not before Jones sends Cole back to 2015. Flashbacks reveal how Cole and Ramse joined the West VII and how Cole and Max became intimately involved. Some time later, Ramse challenges Deacon's brutality, and Deacon asks Cole to kill him. At the last minute, Cole refuses and flees the West VII with Ramse, leaving Max behind. In 2043, the time machine malfunctions and sends Cole back just a few days. He is captured by Deacon and forced to reveal the location of the hidden tunnel (his going back in time made the attack possible in the first place). Max frees Cole and they use his foreknowledge of how the attack happened to defeat Deacon's soldiers, saving Ramse and Jones. Deacon sees the time machine and escapes and Max joins Project Splinter. Cole then returns to 2015, where Cassie has discovered the location of the Night Room.
5	5	"The Night Room"	David Boyd	Richard E. Robbins	February 13, 2015	0.664
Cole and Cassie break into the Night Room, finding the Army of the 12 Monkeys had got there first after being told where it is by Jennifer. The Pallid Man tortures Cole for information on how to break into the Night Room's vault, revealing to Cassie that Cole had killed Henri. Later, Cole explains to Cassie why he killed Henri and reveals more of his past to her. In 2043, Ramse discovers that Jones had sent other chrononauts into the past before Cole, some of whom had died. He confronts Jones but grudgingly agrees to go along with her after she promises to protect Cole. In 2015, the Army manages to cut open the vault door, revealing the source of the plague virus, a centuries-old preserved human torso. The Pallid Man tricks Jennifer into deactivating the vault's final failsafe, but Cole and Cassie incinerate the viral specimen. Cassie is captured by the Army and Cole splinters away, finding himself in an alternative 2043 where the West VII have taken over the temporal facility.
6	6	"The Red Forest"	Alex Zakrzewski	Christopher Monfette	February 20, 2015	0.686
Cole learns that in alternative 2043, Cassie was killed in 2015, causing drastic changes to the timeline, the plague emerged earlier and was linked to an event called Operation Troy. Cole convinces the leader of the West VII—who, in this timeline, is Ramse—to let Jones send him back in time so he can prevent Cassie's death. After being shot in an argument, the dying Jones sends Cole back to 2015, telling him to ask his version of Jones about "sacrifice". In 2015, Cole kidnaps Aaron Marker and forces him to help him rescue Cassie. The Pallid Man drugs Cassie with a hallucinogen and an unnamed female member of the Army guides her through the hallucinations, saying that she is taking Cassie to meet "the Witness". Cole and Aaron track down and free Cassie, and Cole splinters in front of Aaron. Aaron apologizes to Cassie for not believing her, and they resolve to investigate Operation Troy. Back in 2043, Cole finds his timeline has been restored. He asks Jones about the alternate Jones's last words, and Jones admits that traveling through time is slowly destroying his body and will eventually kill him.
7	7	"The Keys"	John Badham	Sean Tretta	February 27, 2015	0.696
Cassie and Marker investigate Operation Troy and the artefact fragments Cole found, deducing that Markridge Group's M5-10 is being used to kill CIA-leaker Adam Wexler in Chechnya. Cole splinters away and hours later calls Cassie from Chechnya, explaining that information she and Marker will give him one week in the future allowed him to take possession of the virus before the Army of the 12 Monkeys. Mercenaries capture Cole and Wexler opens the case, exposing them all to the virus. As the mercenaries begin dying, they offer to trade Wexler for medical aid and Cole convinces Wexler to open fire on the mercenaries. Before dying, Wexler tells Cole that the Army of the 12 Monkeys were involved in a 1987 yakuza war in Tokyo. Cole calls Cassie, allowing the CIA to trace his location to burn the virus with Predator drones and begs her not to tell him of his fate when they meet in a week. Marker threatens the CIA with exposure to gain his and Cassie's release, and Cassie follows through with Cole's wishes to not let him know he is going to his death.
8	8	"Yesterday"	Michael Waxman	Story by : Natalie Chaidez & Oliver Grigsby; Teleplay by : Oliver Grigsby	March 6, 2015	0.843
In 2043, Jones sends Ramse and Whitley to Spearhead, a military colony, to ask for help stabilizing the time machine's energy core. It is revealed that Jones and Whitley once lived at Spearhead but left after its leader, Colonel Foster, took power in a bloody coup. Foster declines Jones's request, saying he needs the resources to work on a cure for the plague. Ramse encounters Elena, an old flame and discovers he is the father of her son, Sam. When a failed attempt to retrieve Cole destroys the energy core, Jones comes to Spearhead to request the use of their core. Foster eventually agrees on the condition that Jones return to Spearhead to work on the cure. Ramse suggests accepting Foster's offer, but Jones remains convinced that the virus is incurable and resolves to obtain Spearhead's energy core by any means necessary. In 2015, Cassie travels to the site of the airstrike to determine if Cole is truly gone. She concludes that he has been erased from the timeline and the plague has been averted. It is revealed that Cole is alive but stranded in 2017 where the plague is well underway.
9	9	"Tomorrow"	TJ Scott	Story by : Terry Matalas & Travis Fickett; Teleplay by : Rebecca Kirsch	March 13, 2015	0.708
In 2043, Jones orders her team to seize Spearhead's energy core. She kills Foster, her group captures the core and reenergizes the time machine at the cost of many lives, including Whitley's father. Ramse takes Sam and Elena to safety; the latter claims Foster had a cure for the virus and suggests Jones is lying. Jones is seen destroying a page from Foster's research showing that the 2040 virus was cured. Flashbacks to 2041 reveal how Cole and Ramse met Jones and how Ramse coerced Cole into joining Project Splinter. In 2017, Cole is brought to the CDC to see a dying Cassie. She tells him that a lot happened between them after 2015 and gives him an important address before dying. Jennifer appears, preaching to a group of refugees about "daughters" and an "army". As Cole splinters away, the scratch he made on Cassie's watch in 2013 disappears. Back in 2043, he argues with Ramse, who says Jones lied about Foster's cure and wants to end Project Splinter to ensure his family is not erased from the timeline. Cole retorts that the project is the only way to stop the virus and save Cassie, and the two come to blows.
10	10	"Divine Move"	Magnus Martens	Story by : Terry Matalas & Travis Fickett; Teleplay by : Christopher Monfette	March 20, 2015	0.727
Cole appears in 2015, shocking Cassie and Aaron. He and Cassie find the journal of Dr. Oliver Peters, the plague's creator, which points them to Tokyo in 1987. After Cole returns to 2043, Cassie tracks down Peters, who was forced to recreate the virus by the Army. He begs Cassie to kill him, but she lets him go. The unnamed female member of the Army meets Aaron and asks him what he would do to protect Cassie. In 2043, Ramse destroys Jones's research on the history of the plague and steals the drug that allows Cole to splinter. Fleeing, he encounters the Daughters, an all-female sect led by an aged Jennifer. She tells him about the Witness and says Ramse will be a friend to them. In pursuit of Ramse, Jones's men kill Elena. Ramse returns to the temporal facility and tries to blow up the time machine, failing but killing Max. Trapped, he injects himself with the time-travel drug and splinters to 1987 Tokyo. Before sending Cole after Ramse, Jones warns him he must complete the mission this time as his body can only take one more jump before failing; Cole vows to kill his friend should the latter interfere.
11	11	"Shonin"	Mark Tonderai	Sean Tretta	March 27, 2015	0.677
In 1987 Tokyo, Cole tries to stop Leland Goines from acquiring the plague virus but is stabbed, apparently fatally, by Ramse. During his imprisonment for the stabbing, Ramse is contacted by Olivia, the mysterious member of the Army of the 12 Monkeys. Upon his release in 1995, he is initiated into the Army. Flashbacks cover events from the 1990s to 2015, revealing that the Army invested in Markridge's development of the plague virus and that Ramse, believing he killed Cole in 1987, used his knowledge of Cole's actions to help the Army foil all of Cole's attempts to stop the plague and ensure that all events happened as he remembers them from 2043. In 2015, Aaron loses his job and becomes involved with the project that will become Spearhead. He sees that Olivia will direct that project. Jennifer is found by the Army and taken in by Olivia. In 2043, a desperate Jones sends the injured Cole from 1987 to 2015, stranding him in that time. Jones's subordinates abandon her, believing Project Splinter is over. In 2015, Cole gasps to Cassie that the identity of the Witness, who has helped the Army remain one step ahead of them, is Ramse.
12	12	"Paradox"	Dennie Gordon	Story by : Terry Matalas; Teleplay by : Richard E. Robbins	April 3, 2015	0.580
In 2015, Cassie finds the 2015 version of Jones using the address she gave Cole in 2017 and convinces her to help Cole, who is dying from the effects of time travel. To cure him, they need a blood sample from the young 2015 version of Cole, so they bring Cole's father and young Cole to see the adult Cole. Aaron gives the Army Cole's location in exchange for ensuring Cassie's safety. When the Army comes for Cole, Cole's father dies defending him. Cole injects himself with the blood sample, causing an explosive temporal paradox that cures him and drives off the Army. Cole, Cassie and Jones leave the young Cole in foster care, and Jones tells Cole that the cure has removed his ability to travel through time. Jennifer stages a hostile takeover of the Markridge Group and installs herself as the new CEO. In 2043, Jones is attempting to rebuild Project Splinter, when an unknown group of 12 individuals, guided by Deacon, assaults the temporal facility.
13	13	"Arms of Mine"	David Grossman	Terry Matalas & Travis Fickett	April 10, 2015	0.661
In 2015, Cole and Cassie interrogate Aaron about the Army; after attempting to flee, Aaron is caught in a fire and apparently killed. Acting on information gained from Jennifer, Cole and Cassie break into Raritan National Laboratories, which houses the operational time machine and come face-to-face with Ramse, who plans to return to 2043. It is revealed that Ramse is not the Witness, and Cassie and Ramse are shot. Cole uses the machine to send Cassie to 2043, in the hope that Jones will be able to save her and helps the less-gravely wounded Ramse escape. Olivia readies 12 mysterious newborn infants for the Army's plans, which will come to fruition in 28 years. Jennifer embarks on a air trip, apparently to spread the plague virus. In 2043, Deacon and the group of 12 he is guiding storm the temporal facility and attempt to seize the time machine. By threatening to blow it up, Jones negotiates the release of her subordinates and then turns the machine over to the group of 12, just as the injured Cassie arrives from 2015.

=== Season 2 (2016) ===
No. overall	No. in season	Title	Directed by	Written by	Original release date	US viewers (millions)
14	1	"Year of the Monkey"	David Grossman	Terry Matalas & Travis Fickett	April 18, 2016 (Note: The first episode of the second season, "Year of the Monkey", was released online on April 4, 2016, two weeks before its television premiere.)	0.476
In 2016, Cole and Ramse are on the run from the Army. They ask Benjamin Kalman, an ex-Markridge scientist, to remove a tracking device from Ramse. Kalman, who is still in the Army's employ, paralyzes Ramse and reveals that Jennifer Goines will release the plague in New York. Cole disposes of Kalman, and Ramse decides to accompany him to New York to find Jennifer. In 2043, the Messengers, the mysterious group of 12, use the time machine to send 6 of their members to other times. Cassie, now imprisoned by the Messengers, offers to treat Deacon's chronic illness if he helps stop them; he frees her and has the West VII blow up the time machine, killing the remaining Messengers. Back in 2016, Cole tracks Jennifer down and urges her not to release the virus. Agents of the Army interrupt and attempt to kill Cole, but Cassie splinters in from 2044 and shoots them, telling Cole that she and Jones deduced that Jennifer started the plague. She prepares to shoot Jennifer, but Cole raises his own gun to stop her, ending in a standoff.
15	2	"Primary"	Magnus Martens	Sean Tretta	April 25, 2016	0.318
In 2016, Cole persuades Jennifer not to release the plague. He and Cassie destroy Jennifer's supply of virus, altering history, although they, Ramse, and Jones still remember the previous timeline thanks to the time-travel drug. After Cole stops Cassie from killing Ramse, she splinters to 2044 with the latter, abandoning Cole in 2016. Jennifer takes Cole to the Emerson Hotel, where the manager gives Cole the key to room 607, which Cole purchased in 1944. Inside, Cole finds a photo of him and Cassie from 1944. Jennifer, feeling purposeless after deciding not to start the plague, attacks and seduces Cole, then cuts herself. Cole calms her and tells her to find a new purpose, and she leaves. In 2044, history has changed: the plague began a few years later, and Jones has a lover, Dr. Eckland, of whom she has no memory. Deacon and Cassie unsuccessfully interrogate Ramse about the Messengers. The older Jennifer has the Daughters force Jones to retrieve Cole from 2016, repaying him for helping her younger self. Cole talks with Cassie about how his actions have affected her and how saving, not killing, people is the only thing he has done that changed history. He leaves Cassie to contemplate the 1944 photo.
16	3	"One Hundred Years"	David Grossman	Michael Sussman	May 2, 2016	0.405
Cole and Cassie travel to 1944 to stop two of the Messengers from murdering a scientist, Thomas Crawford. They are unable to prevent Crawford's death but deduce that the Messengers' real target is his son Tommy Jr., who, like Jennifer, is a "Primary" with a special connection to time. They manage to get to Tommy first; he addresses both of them by name and says he is fated to be killed by the Messengers. One of the Messengers takes Cole hostage and tortures him, forcing Cassie to surrender Tommy. The Messenger kills Tommy in a ceremonial ritual using bone taken from his remains in the future, triggering an explosive temporal paradox that renders her, Cole, and Cassie unconscious and strands the latter two in 1944. In 2044, Jones allows Deacon to do as he wishes with Ramse. Just as he is about to kill Ramse, a massive temporal anomaly erupts, and Ramse runs to escape it, dragging Deacon along with him.
17	4	"Emergence"	David Grossman	Richard E. Robbins	May 9, 2016	0.425
Ramse is sent to 1944 to rescue Cole and Cassie. Though unable to stop Tommy's murder, he frees them from FBI agent Robert Gale. Gale deduces Cole is a time traveler and lets him interrogate the female Messenger who killed Tommy. She reveals that the Witness seeks to destroy time itself, then escapes. After the three travelers return to 2044, Gale leaves Cole and Cassie's photo in the Emerson Hotel for Cole to find in 2016. In 2044, a baffled Jones turns to Jennifer for help as the temporal anomaly grows. In a drug-induced vision about the nature of time, she learns that the Army plans to destroy time by killing the Primaries. Upon returning, Cole, Cassie, and Ramse grudgingly agree to work together to save the Primaries. In 1971, the female Messenger dies after inducting her son, the Pallid Man, into the Army. In 2016, Jennifer checks herself into a mental clinic as the Pallid Man watches outside.
18	5	"Bodies of Water"	Mairzee Almas	Kristen Reidel	May 16, 2016	0.367
In 2044, Jennifer sends Cassie to 2016 to get the Primaries' identities from her younger self. Desperate to get rid of Deacon, Cole and Ramse betray him to one of his enemies, the Foreman. Deacon kills the Foreman, and instead of retaliating, congratulates the duo on becoming as ruthless as he. In 2016, the Witness gives Olivia a new mission: find and prepare Cassie. Cassie and Jennifer return to the latter's old home, which triggers childhood memories of Jennifer's mother trying to drown her. Cassie comforts Jennifer, who is then able to tell Cassie another Primary's name: Kyle Slade. The Pallid Man captures them, and Olivia gives Cassie a hallucinogen. In a vision, Cassie sees Aaron's face behind the Witness's mask. Jennifer breaks loose and sees a manuscript, "the Word of the Witness," containing her death date: September 23, 2044. She rescues Cassie and stabs Olivia. The Witness puts the Pallid Man in charge of the Army's mission, replacing Olivia. Cassie tells Cole about Slade and decides to stay in 2016 to look after Jennifer. In 1975, Slade senses that Cole is coming for him.
19	6	"Immortal"	David Greene	Ian Sobel & Matt Morgan	May 23, 2016	0.348
Cole and Ramse travel to 1975 to prevent the Messengers from "paradoxing" Kyle Slade, a Vietnam vet turned serial killer. They rescue Victoria Mason, Slade's last recorded victim, then tip off the police who arrest Slade. However, Slade claims that he knows where the Witness is, so Cole frees him, abandoning Ramse. A Messenger holds Victoria hostage, and Ramse kills him and frees her. Slade tells Cole his victims were Primaries whom he killed to stop the Army from sacrificing them and leads Cole to his lair, where he is holding captive a man he claims is the Witness. Cole recognizes the man as a Messenger, not the Witness. Realizing Slade is completely insane, Cole and Ramse kill the Messenger, then Slade. Upon their return to 2044, the temporal anomaly has partially receded. In 2016, Cassie sees the Witness, who appears to her in a vision as Aaron, then as Cole. Jennifer leaves Cassie to look for other ways of fighting the Army. Cassie is left questioning her sanity as she continues to have visions of the Witness.
20	7	"Meltdown"	Grant Harvey	Richard E. Robbins	May 30, 2016	0.423
In 2044, Cassie's hallucinations worsen. The time machine suddenly malfunctions, transporting people from random points in the timeline into the temporal facility, including soldiers from 1959 and horribly mutated former test subjects for Project Splinter, with whom the team members are confronted. Eckland sacrifices himself to prevent the time machine from destroying the facility. When Cole and Ramse try to power down the machine, Cassie takes Sam hostage and holds him at gunpoint to stop them. Cole and Ramse realize she is under the influence of the Witness, who used her to sabotage the machine. To snap her out of her trance, Cole has Ramse shoot him, knowing she will not let him die. Ramse shuts down the power, but Sam is struck by a backlash of temporal energy and splinters. Jones administers Cassie a drug to prevent the Witness from possessing her again, and a grieving Ramse leaves the temporal facility. Sam is met in an unspecified time period by an unseen figure.
21	8	"Lullaby"	Steven A. Adelson	Sean Tretta	June 6, 2016	0.425
Despondent over Eckland's death, Jones sends Cassie to 2020 to assassinate her younger self and prevent Project Splinter from ever beginning. There, Cassie finds the Jones of 2020 watching over her deathly ill daughter, Hannah. After she kills Jones, Cassie wakes up at the beginning of the same day, along with Cole, who has come to stop her. Eventually they discover they are trapped in a temporal loop. With help from the Jennifer of 2020, they break the loop and return to 2044. They explain to Jones that her creation of Project Splinter was fated and attempting to alter that fate caused the loop. To escape it, they saved Hannah and gave her to Jennifer's Daughters to raise, letting Jones believe she was dead so that she would start the project. They then reunite Jones with the adult Hannah. Cole tells Cassie about his feelings for her, but she rebuffs him, fearing that they stand to lose too much if she reciprocates. Ramse appears in her room, threatening to shoot her for her role in Sam's disappearance. Instead she proposes that the two of them kill the Witness; he agrees.
22	9	"Hyena"	Bill Eagles	Story by : Christopher Monfette; Teleplay by : Christopher Monfette and Sean Tretta	June 13, 2016	0.349
In 2044, Cassie and Ramse search for an archivist known as the Keeper, hoping to learn about Titan, a place linked to the Witness. He points them to a Dr. Kirschner in 1961 East Germany. Cole travels to 2016 to meet with Jennifer, who now leads the Hyenas, a group of former psychiatric patients whom she gathered to fight the Army. The Hyenas capture Oliver Peters, who has created a vaccine for the plague virus, and use him as bait to lure out the Pallid Man. The Hyenas eventually turn on Jennifer and Cole, who manage to capture the Pallid Man and run away from the Hyenas. Cole tortures the Pallid Man for information on the last Primary; he says the final paradox takes place in 1957 New York. He then reveals he let himself be captured in order to get to Jennifer and detonates a bomb which kills Peters and all the Hyenas, then escapes. After consoling Jennifer on the Hyenas' deaths, Cole splinters away, and she finds another version of Cole at her door. The Pallid Man hires Dr. Elliot Jones, Jones's ex-husband and inventor of the time machine, to work on a project called "Titan."
23	10	"Fatherland"	Guy Norman Bee	Oliver Grigsby	June 20, 2016	0.389
In 2044, Ramse and Cassie go rogue and manage to trick Jones into sending them and Cole to 1961; once there, they drug Cole and go to East Berlin, where they find Nazi war criminal Dr. Kirschner but are captured by Mossad agents. Cole enlists the help of FBI agent Gale to help him rescue Cassie, Ramse, and Kirschner. The group realizes that Kirschner is the member of the Army who created the Messengers. Gale sacrifices himself to help the others cross the Berlin Wall. In his West Berlin laboratory, Kirschner shows them the Word of the Witness and reveals the fruits of his research: a young Olivia, who was created using Mantis's ova. Mantis arrives with a group of Army agents to take Olivia, and Kirschner is killed. As the three time travelers are splintered back to 2044, Ramse tears off a corner of the Word of the Witness relating to Titan. Mantis then inducts Olivia into the Army, revealing that the Pallid Man is Olivia's brother. In 2016, Olivia abandons the Army, feeling betrayed by the Witness. Back in 2044, a furious Cole has Ramse and Cassie arrested for going rogue.
24	11	"Resurrection"	Kevin Tancharoen	Richard E. Robbins	June 27, 2016	0.398
In 2044, the temporal storms threaten to destroy the Project Splinter facility. Ramse, Cassie and Adler are set free by Whitley, and together mount a coup against Jones and Cole, hoping to use the time machine to travel to Titan and directly confront the Witness. Cole recruits Deacon's help, and persuades Jennifer and the Daughters to help retake the time machine so he can go to 1957 to stop the final paradox. In the process, Jennifer is fatally shot and Deacon is wounded. Cole retrieves young Jennifer from 2016, and 2044 Jennifer tells her younger self that she will have a choice: to lead the Daughters to Titan to battle the 12 Monkeys, or to lead them to find refuge, hoping Cole will succeed in his mission. As the older Jennifer dies, her younger version decides to go to Titan with Ramse's group and the Daughters. As the others evacuate the facility, Cole splinters to 1957; at the last minute, Cassie changes her mind about Titan and chooses to go to 1957 too. The temporal storms finally consume the temporal facility, including Jones and the machine.
25	12	"Blood Washed Away"	David Grossman	Sean Tretta	July 11, 2016 (Note: The twelfth episode of the second season, "Blood Washed Away", first aired on July 6, 2016 in Australia.)	0.472
In 2044, the Project: Splinter members and the Daughters have grown weary of looking for Titan. One of the Daughters rebels and challenges Ramse to a duel to the death, but Jennifer intervenes to stop Ramse from striking the final blow. The group finally finds Titan and confronts the Witness. In 1957, Cole and Cassie spend a year searching desperately for the final Primary. After identifying a likely candidate, they find they have been tricked by one of the Messengers, who has fallen in love with and married his target, the final Primary. The Messenger stabs his wife with her bone and triggers the last paradox. The explosion knocks Cassie into a coma for over six months. When she finally awakes she finds Cole has bought the house she has seen many times in her visions of the Red Forest. There, the pair consummate their relationship while in 2044, the Witness's guardians ambush the Project members at Titan, killing them.
26	13	"Memory of Tomorrow"	David Grossman	Terry Matalas	July 18, 2016 (Note: The thirteenth episode of the second season, "Memory of Tomorrow", first aired on July 16, 2016 in Australia.)	0.431
With no way back, Cole and Cassie build a life together in the house from the Red Forest visions, and Cassie becomes pregnant. Cole experiences time freezes leading him to Lillian, a Primary who teaches him to use red tea, made from the leaves of plants affected by temporal anomalies, to untether his consciousness from time to stop the 1957 paradox. He does so, reluctantly erasing his timeline with Cassie, returning them to Jones in 2044. The three splinter spatially to Titan and with Jennifer and the Daughters prevent Ramse and Hannah dying. They realize Titan is a vast time machine as it activates around them. In the chaos, Deacon dies saving Jennifer who splinters to the trenches of World War I after being hit by a beam from Titan's time machinery; Ramse follows a rogue cell of the army led by Olivia who has custody of Sam; Cassie, now re-acquiring memories from her timeline with Cole, is captured within Titan as it splinters; and Cole demands to follow Cassie to an uncertain 2163. In 2163, Cassie is brought before the assembled Army where The Pallid Man hails her as the mother of The Witness.

=== Season 3 (2017) ===
No. overall	No. in season	Title	Directed by	Written by	Original release date	US viewers (millions)
27	1	"Mother"	Terry Matalas	Terry Matalas	May 19, 2017	0.585
In 2163, Cole finds Titan, just before it travels to 2047. Before he can try to rescue Cassie, he is splintered away by a future version of himself. Future Cole tells him to abandon his search for Cassie and look for Jennifer in the early 20th century. Future versions of Cassie and Cole speak briefly about the path present-day Cole must travel. In 1917, Jennifer has a vision of the Four Horsemen of the Apocalypse—four members of the Army—carrying a mysterious box. In 2163, Cassie is pregnant and in captivity, watched over by Magdalena, an Army member tasked to ensure she stays healthy to give birth to the Witness. Cassie escapes with the help of a maid, Arianna, and leaps off a ledge, hoping to kill herself and the Witness. Magdalena uses a wearable time machine to splinter back and alert her past self, who kills Arianna, preempting Cassie's escape. Several months later, Cassie gives birth to the Witness.
28	2	"Guardians"	David Grossman	Sean Tretta	May 19, 2017	0.399
In 1922, Jennifer enacts one-woman shows in a Paris theater, hoping Jones will notice them in the future in historical records and rescue her. When one of the Horsemen tries to kill her, Cole and Jones splinter in and kill him, then search for the other Horsemen. In 2046, Olivia takes Ramse to an adult Sam, who is near death from an attack by the Witness's men. Sam makes Ramse vow not to undo his death via time travel and to help Olivia kill the Witness; then Ramse euthanizes him. In 2047, Cassie watches as her infant son is placed in the mysterious box—his cradle—and splintered to 1922 with the Four Horsemen. In 1922, Cole and Jones kill two of the remaining Horsemen, and Cole comes upon the Witness's cradle; however, the fourth Horseman, Magdalena, splinters back in time to warn her past self of Cole and Jones's intervention, allowing her to reset the timeline and undo everything that happened after Cole and Jones arrived in 1922. Cole, Jones, and Jennifer then splinter back to 2046. Jennifer accepts Cole's offer to stay in 2046. Ramse brings a captive Olivia to the temporal facility, shouting for Cole.
29	3	"Enemy"	David Grossman	Christopher Monfette	May 19, 2017	0.374
In 2046, Jones has Olivia imprisoned and interrogated. When the latter fails to talk, Jones tortures her by locking her into a time loop where she is splintered repeatedly in and out of existence. Seeing it is not working, Cole instead travels three months back in time with Olivia and confines her in a dungeon reminiscent of the "box" she grew up in. Afterwards, a seemingly broken Olivia agrees to tell them how to find the Witness. In 2047 in Titan, Deacon is brought back from the brink of death by Mallick, one of the Army's enforcers. While he recuperates, he argues with a hallucination of his dead, abusive father about his life, his brother, and the person he became. When he is fully healed, Mallick has him free Cassie from the Army. Back in 2046, Jones sends Cole and Ramse to 2007 to kill the Witness. It is revealed that Olivia told Ramse about the Witness's parentage and that she turned herself in to Project: Splinter in order to manipulate Jones into sending Ramse to 2007 so that he can fulfill his true, secret mission: killing Cassie.
30	4	"Brothers"	Joe Menendez	Story by : Travis Fickett; Teleplay by : Travis Fickett and Kristen Reidel	May 19, 2017	0.324
In 2046, Jennifer has repeated dreams of an unidentified dying man in a church, and begins sketching her visions. Becoming suspicious of Olivia's motives, she questions the woman about her real reasons in coming to Project: Splinter. In 2007, Ramse maintains the charade that he and Cole are there to kill the Witness while secretly plotting to kill Cassie. After a first failed attempt, Cole inadvertently gives him information on her location. Ramse slips away from Cole and goes to the location, only to find Cole waiting for him, having deliberately misinformed Ramse after deducing his real target. Ramse tells a stunned Cole that the Witness is his and Cassie's son. The two argue, and Cole mortally wounds Ramse. Before he dies, Ramse reconciles with Cole and pleads with him not to use time travel to undo his death. In 2047, Cassie and Deacon escape from Titan with Mallick's help and make their way back to the temporal facility, finding it totally destroyed. Noticing a sign from the past left for her, Cassie unearths time-travel tethers that allow her and Deacon to splinter back to 2046, where they reunite with Cole.
31	5	"Causality"	David Greene	Kristen Reidel	May 20, 2017	0.397
In 2046, Cole and Cassie decide to keep the identity of their son, Athan, secret from Jones. Jones agrees to Jennifer's elaborate plan to obtain the Word of the Witness by splintering her to 1989 and posing as her own mother at an auction so that Cole and Cassie can get access to the Word and make a copy, then return it to its hiding place in order not to disturb the causal chain. The plan goes awry when Jennifer exceeds her bidding limit during the auction, causing Leland Goines to intervene and forcing Deacon to take the bidders hostage. When Cole and Cassie fail to find the Word, Jennifer manages to track it down and make a copy, briefly confronting her father and her 1989 self. Upon returning to 2046, Cole and Cassie fear the Word will reveal the Witness's true identity, but it is revealed Jennifer deliberately blotted out that portion of the Word when copying it.
32	6	"Nature"	Kat Candler	Ian Sobel and Matt Morgan	May 20, 2017	0.315
In 2046, Jennifer's visions intensify, and on Deacon's advice, she begins conversing with them. Following a lead from the Word of the Witness, Cole and Cassie splinter to 1953, where they recruit FBI Agent Gale to help them. Gale learns that several locations mentioned in the Word are sites of disasters, and that people in those sites are disappearing. Cassie poses as a woman widowed by a mining accident to lure out the Army; a mysterious man makes contact and invites her to a revival gathering. Cassie tells Gale that she and Cole will be responsible for his death in 1961. At the revival, Cole and Cassie learn the mysterious man is a missionary; his wife is the female Messenger, Mantis, and his son is the Pallid Man. There, Athan, in this time a young boy, is revealed to be a Primary. He chooses one of the audience members to be initiated into the Army, then gasses the remaining audience to death. Cole and Cassie steal a personal time machine from a Horseman and escape back to 2046. Cassie tells Cole she cannot kill their son, even after seeing what he is; Cole replies that he can.
33	7	"Nurture"	Steven A. Adelson	Story by : Adam Sussman; Teleplay by : Adam Sussman and Christopher Monfette	May 20, 2017	0.313
In 2046, Jones learns how to disrupt the personal time machines and prevent the Horsemen from resetting the timeline. She sends a team to 1953 to kill Athan. Cassie requests to be sent instead to 1990, where she asks her mother, a psychiatrist, to analyze the Word of the Witness. The elder Cassie concludes its author is deeply uncertain of himself and loathes killing, reassuring Cassie Athan is not a monster. She returns to 2046, finding Jones has traveled in time to learn that the Witness is her and Cole's son. Furious at her betrayal, Jones imprisons Cassie, who steals the personal time machine and splinters to 1953. In 1953, Jones's team assaults the Army's hideout in pursuit of Athan. Hannah is severely wounded, and Jennifer briefly converses with Athan, Primary-to-Primary. Cassie kills Magdalena. When Cole is unable to bring himself to kill Athan, Deacon prepares to do so, but Cassie shoots him down, and Athan splinters away with a Horseman. Cole steals a personal time machine and splinters away with Cassie to search for Athan. The rest of the team returns to 2046, where Jones and Deacon prepare to hunt down Cole and Cassie.
34	8	"Masks"	David Grossman	Story by : Tony Elliott; Teleplay by : Tony Elliott and Sean Tretta	May 21, 2017	0.278
In 1879, Sebastian, the Horseman who helped Athan escape 1953, encourages Athan to write his visions down in the document that becomes the Word of the Witness. In 2046, Jones has difficulty tracking Cole and Cassie as they jump through time. She consults Olivia, who tells her Jennifer is protecting them by misdirecting her. Before Jones can catch her, Jennifer splinters away. In 1899 London, Cole and Cassie attend a masked ball which was mentioned in the Word. They find Sebastian but are captured by Jones, Deacon, and Hannah. Cole unsuccessfully tries to convince Jones that Athan can be saved. Jennifer appears and creates a distraction, allowing Cole, Cassie, and Sebastian to escape. Sebastian says he and Athan parted in 1879 but gives them the address of Athan's old home. He is shot by Jones, buying Cole and Cassie time to splinter away to Athan's house. Back in 2046, Deacon imprisons Jennifer and releases Olivia. In 1899, an adult Athan bids farewell to the dying Sebastian.
35	9	"Thief"	David Grossman	Sean Tretta	May 21, 2017	0.232
In 1899 London, Cole and Cassie read Athan's journals to learn about his past. Cursed with the ability to foresee others' deaths, Athan constantly splinters from era to era to stay sane. Eventually his time machine malfunctions, stranding him in 1891 London. He falls in love with a doctor, Eliza, whose death he cannot foresee. When Eliza is killed, he repairs the machine and uses it to prevent her death, but she dies of another cause. Despite hundreds of attempts to avert her death with time travel, she always dies on the same day. Athan splinters to the 2000s to see Cassie for advice. Having just lost her first patient, she suggests time is a "thief," wishing for it to stop forever; Athan then decides to embrace his destiny as the Witness and destroy time so that he can be reunited with Eliza. In 2046, Jennifer struggles to make sense of her visions. She determines she must save the dying man she saw, who is linked to a mausoleum. Eventually, she has Jones send her "home" with the time machine. In 1891 London, Cole and Cassie confront Athan.
36	10	"Witness"	Grant Harvey	Terry Matalas	May 21, 2017	0.246
Cole and Cassie meet Athan in 1959, at the House of Cedar and Pine, and try to convince him he can choose his own destiny. Jones's forces appear, having been told the location and time by Olivia. Titan splinters in around the house. Jones shoots and apparently kills Athan, whose personal time machine splinters him away. Mallick takes Cole, Cassie, and Jones to meet Olivia, the Army's new leader. It is revealed Olivia and Mallick had conspired to manipulate the members of Project Splinter into finding and killing the Witness. Unexpectedly, Athan splinters in. A flashback reveals he had splintered to Jennifer in 2017. She had summoned medical help to save him, and he had spent a year helping her work with her visions before returning to 1959 to rescue Cole, Cassie, and Jones. The latter flee and return to 2046 while Athan confronts Olivia. He tells her she, not he, is the true Witness. Shocked, she kills him and gives orders that Titan be splintered to 2046 and the temporal facility destroyed. In 2015, Cole's father gives young Cole a cryptic note from Cole's mother.

=== Season 4 (2018) ===
No. overall	No. in season	Title	Directed by	Written by	Original release date	US viewers (millions)
37	1	"The End"	David Grossman	Sean Tretta	June 15, 2018	0.336
In medieval times, a group of Primaries is burned alive by warriors. The sole surviving Primary, a young girl, is entrusted with an ouroboros artifact, and recites Cole's name. In 2046, Cassie revives Jones after her heart stops. Titan splinters in and the temporal facility is attacked. Deacon delays Olivia's forces while Jones's group splinters the entire facility away; Deacon is left behind, and Whitley and Lasky are killed. Jones receives a massive radiation dose. The temporal facility rematerializes under the Emerson Hotel. The time machine is drained of power: Cole proposes to steal a power core from the temporal facility's previous location to repair the machine. Traveling there, Cole sees his past self and realizes Jones's group splintered back to 2043 when they escaped. In 2018 Prague, Jennifer, working with another version of herself, steals the ouroboros artifact from a museum.
38	2	"Ouroboros"	Terry Matalas	Terry Matalas	June 15, 2018	0.259
In 2043, the Cole, Cassie, and Jones of 2046 infiltrate the temporal facility, taking care not to interfere with their own past timelines. Jones discusses time travel with her 2043 self, then uses the 2043 time machine to send Cassie to 1971, where the latter plans to kill a young Olivia. Cole and Jones then pose as their 2043 selves to steal the power core from the 2043 time machine. In the process, Cole and Jones have emotional conversations with 2043 Ramse and 2043 Whitley, respectively. In 2018 Prague, Bonham, an Interpol agent, investigates Jennifer's theft of the artifact. Jennifer learns her Primary abilities are gone, and her alternate personality vanishes. While attempting to flee, she is intercepted by Bonham at a train station; the latter reveals his knowledge of the 12 Monkeys. In order to escape, Jennifer throws herself into the path of an oncoming train.
39	3	"45 RPM"	Christopher Byrne	Sean Tretta	June 15, 2018	0.215
In 1971, teenaged Olivia has apparently abandoned the Army and is on the run from her mother, Mantis. She lives with a friend and is surviving by theft. Mantis and her protectors find her; she escapes but is caught by police and held in a cell. Cassie, in 1971 to kill Olivia, is involved in a shootout while spying on her and is caught by police; she is put in a cell next to Olivia's. It is revealed Olivia is pregnant. Cassie tries to help her change her fate by talking to her as a mother. It is revealed Olivia was devoted to the Witness all along, and it was her mother who was trying to remove her. Cassie shoots at Olivia, but Mantis steps in to take the bullet. Olivia's child is born and left near a tree in a forest. In 2018, Future Cole saves Jennifer from the oncoming train. He warns her that Present Cole is coming to meet her. Cole and Jennifer get the Ouroboros back from the Interpol agent, and Cole opens it by remembering the story from his childhood. Inside, he finds a slip of paper with the notation "Blackleaf 1852": the next mission. Cole reunites with Cassie at the Emerson Hotel and assures her they will break the loop. At Titan, Deacon is dug out, still alive and angry at being left behind. Olivia kills Mallick, and Deacon becomes her new right-hand man.
40	4	"Legacy"	Joe Menendez	Christopher Monfette	June 22, 2018	0.336
Cole, Cassie, Hannah, and Jennifer splinter to Blackleaf, Montana in 1852. There, Hannah recognizes her father, Dr. Elliot Jones, and the team learns that Elliot is working with the Pallid Man and the Army to construct the main tower of Titan in Blackleaf. Hannah splinters back to 2043 with Elliot to the Project Splinter facility where Elliot and Jones deduce that the Army plans to use the Titan to create a paradox to destroy time and create the Red Forest. Cassie figures out that Jennifer has lost her "Primary" abilities. Cole, Cassie, and Jennifer encounter Tihkoosue of the Siksika who tells them about a weapon that past Primaries made to destroy the Witness. Despite Tihkoosue's warning, Jennifer takes a drink to speak to the old Primaries about the weapon, revealing the team's time and location in Blackleaf to Olivia along with the existence of the weapon. Elliot and Hannah splinter back to Blackleaf and the team devises a plan to destroy the power cores for Titan. Olivia sends Deacon to Blackleaf and foils the plan. Before being killed by Deacon, Elliot manages to steal the designs for Titan and give them to Hannah. The team splinters back to the Project Splinter facility where Cole reveals that the story from his childhood about the weapon came from Cole's mother. In the early development of Project Splinter's time machine, Elliot's assistant Emma is revealed to be a member of the Army as well as Olivia's daughter.
41	5	"After"	Sheree Folkson	Oliver Grigsby	June 22, 2018	0.273
In 2043, Jennifer searches the FBI database for the message "Climb the Steps, Ring the Bell" which she believes is a clue to finding the weapon that can be used against the Army. After her search uncovers a picture of the message written on the wall of a motel room in 1966, the team believes that Soviet spies are attempting to buy the weapon. Cole and Cassie splinter to 1966 and attempt to obtain the weapon. The Army interferes and poisons Cole. Cassie splinters to 2043 and then back earlier in 1966 to warn Cole. Jennifer also splinters to 1966 to help save Cole with the help of FBI agent Robert Gale, who is revealed to have prevented his own death in 1961. Jennifer figures out that the message on the wall was actually written by herself. Cassie, Jennifer, and Gale succeed in saving Cole. Working for the Army, Deacon obtains a case believed to contain the weapon, but he implies to Jennifer that he has actually not switched sides. Gale provides information to the team that leads them to believe that the Ahnenerbe, an SS organization in Nazi Germany, uncovered the weapon during World War 2. Through a conversation with the Pallid Man's father, Cassie begins to believe that the creation of the Red Forest may be the only way she and Cole can be together.
42	6	"Die Glocke"	David Grossman	Sarah C. Mueller and Terry Matalas & Sean Tretta	June 22, 2018	0.264
In 1940 France, a Nazi SS officer acquires a manor and holds a gala for exhibiting artifacts collected by the Ahnenerbe. One of those artifacts is "Die Glocke" which the Project Splinter team believes is "the bell" referenced in the clue "Climb the Steps, Ring the Bell." Cole, Jones, Cassie, and Jennifer splinter to 1940 with a plan to infiltrate the gala and obtain Die Glocke. Deacon also splinters to the gala and joins the team, revealing that he is still on Project Splinter's side despite ostensibly working for the Army. The team encounters French Resistance operatives who plan to use a bomb to assassinate Adolf Hitler, who will be attending the gala. Although their plan is complicated by the Resistance's efforts, the team manages to obtain Die Glocke. Deacon and Jennifer also kill Hitler by detonating the Resistance's bomb. It is revealed that the case Deacon obtained in 1966 contained a useless artifact. Upon examining Die Glocke, the team discovers the message "1491, Hertfordshire, England." In 2043, Deacon and Jones agree to allow Deacon to maintain the appearance of working for the Army by capturing Jones and delivering her to Olivia.
43	7	"Daughters"	Mairzee Almas	Christopher Monfette	June 29, 2018	0.293
Emma is brought to 2043 to complete Titan while Jones sends Hannah on a mission to 2007 with a sealed letter that is to be opened on March 8, 2009. In 2043, Olivia psychically interrogates Jones, trying to obtain the location of the Primaries' weapon. Jones finally confesses that it is in 1491 England, and Olivia orders Titan to splinter away to that time. It is revealed Jones confessed deliberately so that Adler could use Titan's temporal signature as a beacon to splinter Jennifer, Cole, and Cassie to 1491. In 2009, Hannah opens the letter and learns her mission is to find Marion Woods, Cole's mother. She rescues Marion from the Army's assassins and discovers Marion is Emma. It is then revealed Emma abandoned the Army after completing Titan and fled to 2009. In 1491, Olivia sends Deacon out to search for the weapon and reveals to Jones her knowledge of Deacon's duplicity, threatening to kill him and everyone she loves.
44	8	"Demons"	David Grossman	Sean Tretta	June 29, 2018	0.243
In 1491 England, Andrus, a rogue Primary who has allied with the Army, helps Olivia search for the Primaries' weapon and kill the Primaries who created it. Jennifer is imprisoned as a witch but is freed by Cole and Cassie. They meet with Nicodemus, a scholar who created the ouroboros artifact. Nicodemus reveals that Jennifer retains her Primary abilities; the Primaries simply chose not to communicate with her for a time to avoid alerting Olivia of their plans. Nicodemus shows them the location of the weapon, which turns out to be a time machine. They ring Die Glocke, activating the machine, but Olivia and Andrus arrive, disabling it. Olivia kills Deacon, but before she can kill the others, Adler manages to send a personal time machine to Cole from 2043. Cole, Cassie, and Jennifer use it to escape to 2043, however Olivia destroys the weapon with a massive temporal paradox, ensuring Deacon's permanent death and rendering the weapon inaccessible for all time. In 2043, older Jennifer advises her younger self to begin listening to her Primary visions again.
45	9	"One Minute More"	David Grossman	Kristen Reidel	June 29, 2018	0.254
In 2043, Jones's group try to decipher Jennifer's final message from the Primaries. Jones realizes that the message contains the dates of all their splinter voyages, and one date to which they have not traveled: 2018, just before the plague's release. Cole and Cassie splinter to 2018 and steal the plague virus from the Army, planning to destroy it. They encounter Hannah at the Emerson Hotel, and realize that the Primaries actually intended them to initiate the plague to ensure time travel would be developed by Jones. As they prepare to release the plague, one of Olivia's agents tries to kill Cole, but Hannah sacrifices herself to save him, and Cassie reluctantly chooses to release the plague in order to ensure causality. Cole finds a letter from Hannah that reveals she is Cole's mother: she and Emma were attacked by the Army and sought help from Cole's father; Emma was fatally wounded, and Hannah took the name of Marion and fell in love with Cole's father, leaving Cole with him to protect him from the Army. Cole and Jones splinter to 2017 to enjoy one last moment as a family with Hannah. Jones deduces she was mistaken about the Primaries' message and that the purpose of their weapon was to erase Cole from all time so that the proper causality could be restored. Olivia initiates the Red Forest paradox.
46	10	"The Beginning Part 1"	Terry Matalas	Terry Matalas	July 6, 2018	0.384
The group realizes that they need to load the Primaries' program into the Project Splinter time machine to erase Cole from time entirely. Cole uses a personal time machine to splinter back to 2163 as his past self finds Titan and rescues him, then splinters to 2018 to rescue Jennifer as she falls onto the train tracks. After he returns, he finds out that their computers will never be able to compile the Primaries' program before the Red Forest paradox destroys time. However, Titan's computers can, so Cole decides to take it over. He retrieves Ramse from just before he dies and recruits him to their cause. Jones then splinters the entire temporal facility into Titan, and the group launches an all-out assault.
47	11	"The Beginning Part 2"	Terry Matalas	Terry Matalas	July 6, 2018	0.331
A massive battle breaks out between Jones's group and the Army of the 12 Monkeys, with the Daughters and the West VII soon joining in. Cassie confronts Olivia and, after a fight, shoves her into a temporal energy beam, splintering the upper half of her body into the distant past, where it becomes the corpse from which the virus originated. Cassie nearly lets time collapse so she can be with Cole forever, but Cole talks her out of it, and she stops the countdown before the Red Forest paradox initiates. Ramse, Jennifer, and Cassie are sent back to their own times while Cole and Jones share a last conversation before Jones dies. Cole loads the Primaries' program into the time machine and activates it, erasing himself from time. A new timeline is created in which time travel is never invented. James Cole, the virus, and the Army of the 12 Monkeys never come to exist, and everybody else lives a different life. Cassie, however, remembers what happened. Cole finds himself on a beach, where Jennifer tells him that Jones modified the program to reinsert him into the new timeline. Cole and Cassie each find their way to the farm house where they once lived together, and the two begin their hard-earned happy ending.

=== Ratings ===
12 Monkeys : U.S. viewers per episode (thousands)

Season	Episode number													Average
Season	1	2	3	4	5	6	7	8	9	10	11	12	13	Average
1	1353	1104	903	731	664	686	696	843	708	727	677	580	661	795
2	476	318	405	425	367	348	423	425	349	389	398	472	431	402
3	585	399	374	324	397	315	313	278	232	246	–			346
4	336	259	215	336	273	264	293	243	254	384	331	–		290

Audience measurement performed by Nielsen Media Research
