= Marcus Whitley =

Marcus Whitley may refer to:

- Marcus Whitley (political candidate), see Claiborne County, Mississippi
- Marcus Whitley, character in 12 Monkeys (TV series)
