= Star Trek: Picard season 3 =

Season of a TV series

Star Trek: Picard
- Season 3
- Promotional poster
- Showrunner: Terry Matalas
- Starring: Patrick Stewart; Jeri Ryan; Michelle Hurd; Ed Speleers
- No. of episodes: 10

Release
- Original network: Paramount+
- Original release: February 16 – April 20, 2023

Season chronology
- ← Previous; Season 2

The third and final season of the American television series Star Trek: Picard features the character Jean-Luc Picard in the year 2401 as he reunites with the former command crew of the USS Enterprise (Geordi La Forge, Worf, William Riker, Beverly Crusher, Deanna Troi, and Data) while facing a mysterious enemy who is hunting Picard's son. The season was produced by CBS Studios in association with Secret Hideout, Weed Road Pictures, and Roddenberry Entertainment, with Terry Matalas serving as showrunner.

Patrick Stewart stars as Picard, reprising his role from the series Star Trek: The Next Generation as well as other Star Trek media. Jeri Ryan, Michelle Hurd, and Ed Speleers also star. The season features guest stars who also reprise their roles from previous Star Trek media, including Stewart's Next Generation co-stars Jonathan Frakes (Riker), Gates McFadden (Crusher), LeVar Burton (La Forge), Michael Dorn (Worf), Marina Sirtis (Troi), and Brent Spiner (Data). A third season of Picard was informally green-lighted by January 2020, allowing it to be filmed back-to-back with the second season. Some third-season scenes were filmed during production on the second, which began in California in February 2021, before filming segued fully to the third in September. Stewart officially announced the season soon after, and filming ended in March 2022. The return of the other Next Generation cast members was confirmed a month later. Matalas hoped to make the season a satisfying ending for Picard's story and the whole Next Generation cast.

The season premiered on the streaming service Paramount+ on February 16, 2023, and ran for 10 episodes until April 20. It was praised by critics and nominated for two Primetime Creative Arts Emmy Awards as well as several other awards.

== Episodes ==
No. overall	No. in season	Title	Directed by	Written by	Original release date
21	1	"The Next Generation"	Doug Aarniokoski	Terry Matalas	February 16, 2023
In the 25th century, Dr. Beverly Crusher and her son Jack are attacked aboard the SS Eleos. Beverly is injured and sends an emergency message to her former Starfleet captain, the retired Admiral Jean-Luc Picard. Picard and his romantic partner Laris are planning a trip to Chaltok IV when he receives the message, and she encourages him to go. Beverly had told Picard not to involve Starfleet, so he goes to his former first officer, Captain William Riker. Riker and Picard stage a surprise inspection of the USS Titan-A, the successor to Riker's former ship, planning to convince its captain, Liam Shaw, to go to Beverly's location without revealing why. Shaw declines, but his first officer is Picard's friend Seven of Nine who ignores Shaw's orders and changes the Titan's course. On M'talas Prime, Starfleet intelligence officer Raffi Musiker searches for a stolen portal device that her mysterious handler fears will be used in a terrorist attack; she fails to find it before it is used to destroy a Starfleet facility. Picard and Riker board the Eleos via shuttlecraft and find Beverly in stasis. They meet Jack as a large ship appears.
22	2	"Disengage"	Doug Aarniokoski	Christopher Monfette & Sean Tretta	February 23, 2023
Picard stops the large ship, the Shrike, from transporting Jack off the Eleos, but it captures the Eleos itself with a tractor beam. Seven persuades Shaw to intervene, and Beverly is transported to the Titan's medical bay while Picard, Riker, and Jack are brought to the bridge. The Shrike's captain, a bounty hunter named Vadic, reveals that Jack is an intergalactic criminal with a large bounty on his head. Shaw has Jack arrested and intends to turn him over to save the crew, despite the protests of Picard and Riker. Raffi's handler orders her to stop investigating the attack, but she meets with the Ferengi criminal Sneed in hopes of finding those responsible. Sneed almost kills her but is killed himself by Raffi's handler, Worf. Jack escapes from custody and attempts to transport himself over to the Shrike in an effort to save his mother, but Riker helps Beverly to the bridge, and when Picard sees her he realizes that Jack is his son from a brief relationship he had with Beverly decades earlier. Knowing that Picard will not hand over his son, Shaw orders the Titan into a nearby nebula as a delighted Vadic gives chase.
23	3	"Seventeen Seconds"	Jonathan Frakes	Jane Maggs & Cindy Appel	March 2, 2023
The Shrike attacks the Titan, injuring Shaw who transfers command to Riker. Beverly says she did not tell Picard about Jack to keep their son safe from his enemies. Riker attempts to escape the nebula but they are cornered by the Shrike using portal technology. Picard advises Riker to lure the Shrike into a trap, but Riker wants to flee and prioritize saving the crew. Jack and Seven deduce that Vadic is tracking a gas leak on the Titan and find an ensign sabotaging the ship. He is revealed to be a Changeling and escapes their custody. Using the freighter La Sirena, Raffi and Worf capture a criminal that they believe is responsible for the attack on M'talas Prime. They discover that he is also a Changeling, part of a group that has been fighting the Federation since the end of the Dominion War, and realize that the attack was just a distraction. Convinced by Picard's insistence that they fight back, Riker fires on the Shrike. Their weapons are redirected back at them with a portal and the Titan sustains heavy damage. Riker blames Picard and orders him off the bridge as they drift towards a gravitational anomaly in the nebula.
24	4	"No Win Scenario"	Jonathan Frakes	Terry Matalas & Sean Tretta	March 9, 2023
With only a few hours of power remaining on the Titan, Riker admits Picard was right and suggests he spend his last moments bonding with Jack. In the holodeck, Picard and Jack tell each other some of their experiences. They are joined by Shaw who bitterly recounts his experience as a Starfleet engineer during the Battle of Wolf 359, when Picard had been assimilated by the Borg and was attacking the Federation as "Locutus of Borg". Vadic, who is a Changeling, is ordered to pursue the Titan at all costs. Doing so within the nebula requires disengagement of the portal technology. Jack, Riker, Beverly, and Picard form a risky plan to use an energy pulse from the nebula to recharge the Titan's systems. Shaw and Seven help them succeed, and Seven identifies and kills the Changeling impostor. The Titan damages the Shrike on its way out of the nebula, which "gives birth to" many jellyfish-like space creatures. As they warp away, Picard realizes that he briefly met Jack five years earlier and inadvertently dismissed his attempt at connection. Alone, Jack has vivid hallucinations and hears voices calling to him.
25	5	"Imposters"	Dan Liu	Cindy Appel & Chris Derrick	March 16, 2023
Riker returns command of the Titan to Shaw, who contacts Starfleet. The USS Intrepid arrives to arrest Picard and Riker, led by Commander Ro Laren who betrayed Starfleet and Picard years earlier but has since returned from imprisonment. Ro forces Picard into the holodeck where she reveals her suspicions that the Changeling conspiracy has compromised Starfleet's highest levels. Picard reconciles with Ro and she gives him her treasured Bajoran earring. As Ro returns to the Intrepid via shuttle, she discovers a bomb planted by Changeling saboteurs and decides to fly into the Intrepid, sacrificing herself and damaging that ship. The saboteurs attempt to transport Jack off the Titan but his visions influence him into killing them. Picard and Riker realize the earring contains the intelligence Ro gathered on the Changelings and is also a communicator. Worf and Raffi learn that something besides the portal technology was stolen from Daystrom Station. Worf attempts to contact his own handler, Ro, and reaches Picard and Riker. As the Titan flees the damaged Intrepid, Jack reveals his visions to Beverly.
26	6	"The Bounty"	Dan Liu	Christopher Monfette	March 23, 2023
Worf and Raffi join the Titan and transport to Daystrom Station with Riker. At the same time, several Starfleet vessels arrive and Picard is forced to flee with the Titan. He seeks help from Geordi La Forge, his former chief engineer, who is now a commodore in charge of the Starfleet Museum. The away team on Daystrom discover a synthetic being created by the late Altan Inigo Soong that contains his memories along with those of former androids Data, B-4, Lal, and Lore. Jack, and La Forge's daughters Sidney and Alandra take a cloaking device from a Klingon ship at the museum so the Titan can hide from Starfleet, and Geordi reluctantly agrees to join them. They return to Daystrom and recover Worf, Raffi, and the synthetic being, which Geordi reactivates. Data reveals that the Changelings stole Picard's original body, which died of the neurological disease Irumodic Syndrome; Picard's mind was transferred into his own synthetic body. Beverly believes Jack inherited Irumodic Syndrome from Picard. Riker is captured by Vadic who reveals that she has already captured his wife, Deanna Troi.
27	7	"Dominion"	Deborah Kampmeier	Jane Maggs	March 30, 2023
Picard believes that the Changelings want to create a perfect replica of himself to target Starfleet's upcoming celebrations for the 250th Frontier Day. Geordi attempts to maintain Data's control of the synthetic body as it is overcome by the devious Lore. Picard devises a plan that traps Vadic and her crew on the Titan with force fields, using Jack—who is developing telepathy—as bait. Picard and Beverly interrogate Vadic and she reveals that she is hunting Jack for someone else. She also explains that she was one of ten Changelings whom Starfleet doctors experimented on to develop a breed of super-spies. Upon their escape, she swore revenge and formed the rogue Changeling faction, taking her torturer's form. Beverly confirms these facts, and Picard decides that he has to kill Vadic. However, Geordi fails to revive Data in time to stop Lore from taking over the Titan's computers and disabling the force fields, allowing Vadic and her underlings to escape. They capture Seven, Shaw, and the rest of the bridge crew. Vadic tells Jack that she knows his true nature and asks him to come to the bridge.
28	8	"Surrender"	Deborah Kampmeier	Matt Okumura	April 6, 2023
Vadic threatens to execute the crew if Jack does not surrender, which he does after she kills a lieutenant. Data realizes that he cannot overpower Lore and instead surrenders his memories, which consume Lore and allow Data full control of the body. The rest of the crew rush to the computer core to plug Data into the Titan's systems, which he reprograms to protect Jack and vent the bridge, killing Vadic. On board the Shrike, Worf and Raffi rescue Riker and Troi, who spent much of their detainment discussing their marital issues. They find Picard's original body and discover that the Changelings have removed portions of the parietal lobe—specifically those supposedly infected with Irumodic Syndrome. After downloading the Shrike's database, the group are transported to the Titan and the Shrike is destroyed. The reunited crew of Picard's USS Enterprise-D gather in the Titan's briefing room to discuss their next moves. With Frontier Day mere hours away and the full extent of the Changelings' plan still not known, Troi attempts to help Jack discover the truth behind his visions using her own empathic abilities.
29	9	"Võx"	Terry Matalas	Sean Tretta & Kiley Rossetter	April 13, 2023
Troi discovers that Jack's visions are coming from the Borg and Picard's supposed Irumodic Syndrome was actually undetected, organic Borg technology from his time as Locutus. This was passed to Jack and activated while his frontal cortex developed. The Changelings stole Picard's original body so they could copy this technology into Starfleet's transporter systems and infect officers under the age of 25. Jack uses his visions to find the Borg Queen, intending to kill her, but is assimilated. Above Earth, Fleet Admiral Elizabeth Shelby on the USS Enterprise-F begins the Frontier Day celebrations and initiates the new "Fleet Formation" protocol that connects all Starfleet ships. The Borg Queen uses Jack to activate the technology in Starfleet's youth, assimilating them and seizing control of the fleet; Shelby is killed. Shaw sacrifices himself to allow Picard and the former Enterprise-D crew to escape, and hands command of the Titan to Seven before he dies. At the Starfleet Museum, Geordi reveals that he has restored the Enterprise-D which is now the only functioning Starfleet ship not controlled by the Borg.
30	10	"The Last Generation"	Terry Matalas	Terry Matalas	April 20, 2023
The Enterprise-D crew find the Queen's Borg Cube in the clouds of Jupiter. Picard, Riker, and Worf board the Cube and find it filled with dead Borg drones that the Queen has been sustaining herself on. The assimilated fleet destroys Earth's planetary shields and starts targeting major cities. Picard connects himself to the Borg collective and rescues Jack from the Queen's influence. Data pilots the Enterprise-D through the Cube so they can retrieve Picard, Jack, Riker, and Worf. They destroy the Cube, killing the Queen and returning the assimilated Starfleet personnel to normal. Picard and his crew receive full pardons and the Enterprise-D is returned to the museum. Crusher modifies Starfleet's transporters to remove the Borg technology and expose the remaining Changeling infiltrators. One year later, the Titan is rechristened the USS Enterprise-G with Seven as captain, Raffi as first officer, and Jack—now a Starfleet ensign—as special counselor. The Enterprise-D crew reminisce over drinks and a game of poker. Later, Jack is visited by the extra-dimensional being Q who says Jack's trial has just begun.

== Cast and characters ==
=== Main ===
- Patrick Stewart as Jean-Luc Picard
- Jeri Ryan as Seven of Nine
- Michelle Hurd as Raffi Musiker
- Ed Speleers as Jack Crusher

=== Recurring ===
- Jonathan Frakes as William Riker
- Gates McFadden as Beverly Crusher
- Todd Stashwick as Liam Shaw
- Ashlei Sharpe Chestnut as Sidney La Forge
- Michael Dorn as Worf
- Amanda Plummer as Vadic
- Marina Sirtis as Deanna Troi
- LeVar Burton as Geordi La Forge
- Brent Spiner as Data / Lore and Altan Inigo Soong
- Mica Burton as Alandra La Forge

=== Notable guests ===
- Orla Brady as Laris
- Thomas Dekker as Titus Rikka
- Michelle Forbes as Ro Laren
- Daniel Davis as Professor Moriarty
- Tim Russ as Tuvok
- Alice Krige as the voice of the Borg Queen
- Elizabeth Dennehy as Elizabeth Shelby
- Majel Barrett as the voice of the Enterprise-D's computer
- Walter Koenig as Anton Chekov
- John de Lancie as Q

== Production ==
=== Development ===
In February 2019, during development of the series Star Trek: Picard, star Patrick Stewart said "we are set up for possibly three years of this show". Showrunner Michael Chabon and the writers were reported in January 2020 to have begun work on a second and third season, with Terry Matalas joining them to fill the void that would be created by Chabon's planned departure later that year. CBS officially announced the second season, but did not confirm an informal green-light for the third season. The second and third seasons were set to be filmed back-to-back, to save costs and simplify scheduling. Matalas became co-showrunner of the second season with executive producer Akiva Goldsman, but half-way through production on the season Matalas switched to being sole showrunner of the third. This happened later than planned because of the COVID-19 pandemic and issues with writing the second season. Matalas brought several creatives from his series 12 Monkeys to work on the third season, including writers Christopher Monfette and Sean Tretta, editor Drew Nichols, composer Stephen Barton, and several actors. Stewart officially announced the third season in September 2021, shortly after filming had begun. In February 2022, Goldsman confirmed that the third season would be the last for the series.

=== Writing ===
The third season begins just over a year after the second. It tells a new story, despite the two seasons being developed together, and Matalas said the third season was "incredibly different" from the first two. He hoped it would be a satisfying conclusion for Picard's story, and said it would be less intimate and have some "game-changing Star Trek Universe ideas". Matalas added that some elements from Star Trek: The Original Series and the films starring the Original Series cast would be used in the season to "tie some Star Trek together", including the Spacedock and boatswain's whistle from those films. The season also has references to the films' "more nautical, cat and mouse submarine-movie" ideas. Star Trek II: The Wrath of Khan (1982) was a "major touchstone" for the season, which features mind games between Picard and a new villain.

In April 2022, when it was revealed that other Star Trek: The Next Generation cast members would be starring in the season, Matalas recalled watching that series as a child and said it was "most fitting that the story of Jean-Luc Picard ends honoring the beginning, with his dearest and most loyal friends from the USS Enterprise". The producers felt the group's final appearance in the film Star Trek: Nemesis (2002) had not been a proper send off and wanted to use the final season of Picard to "send [them] off the right way", similar to what the film Star Trek VI: The Undiscovered Country (1991) had done for the Original Series cast. This was Matalas's core pitch to Stewart and the other returning actors, and he developed each of their storylines with them to avoid telling a story that they were not happy with. He aimed to create endings that also promise more story for the characters. Kurtzman said the season would take its time showing where each character is before bringing them all together, which Matalas compared to Star Wars: The Force Awakens (2015) revealing where the original Star Wars characters are after many years. Matalas also compared the season to a serialized version of a theoretical The Next Generation season eight, and said it was "passing the torch from one generation to the next" like when actors from The Original Series guest starred on The Next Generation. He suggested that a more appropriate title for the season would be Star Trek Legacy rather than Star Trek: Picard, but still felt it was "truly a Picard story".

There were discussions about using the new Borg collective that are introduced at the end of the second season, including clarifying who that group is in relation to the original Borg, exploring the anomaly they discover in the second season, and having them help defeat the original Borg Queen in the third-season finale. Matalas said they avoided exposition-heavy scenes that explained who the new Borg collective are because they felt these would be uninteresting to audiences. The anomaly was not included because the third-season scripts were too far along by the time that idea was introduced to the second-season scripts, and he disliked the idea of the new Borg fighting the original Borg. For the latter, he also questioned the use of resources for such a small moment, and felt it would take away from the storytelling being done with Seven of Nine and the Enterprise-D in the finale.

=== Casting ===
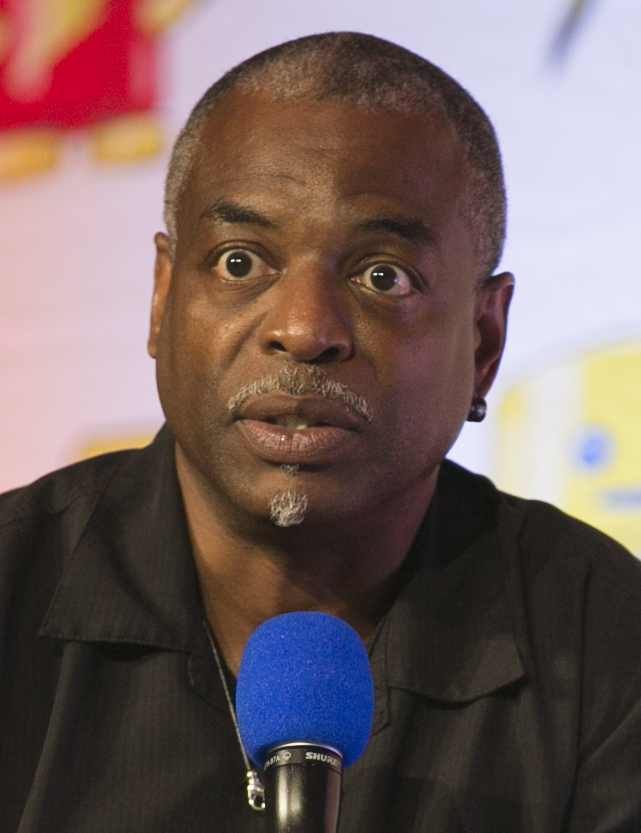
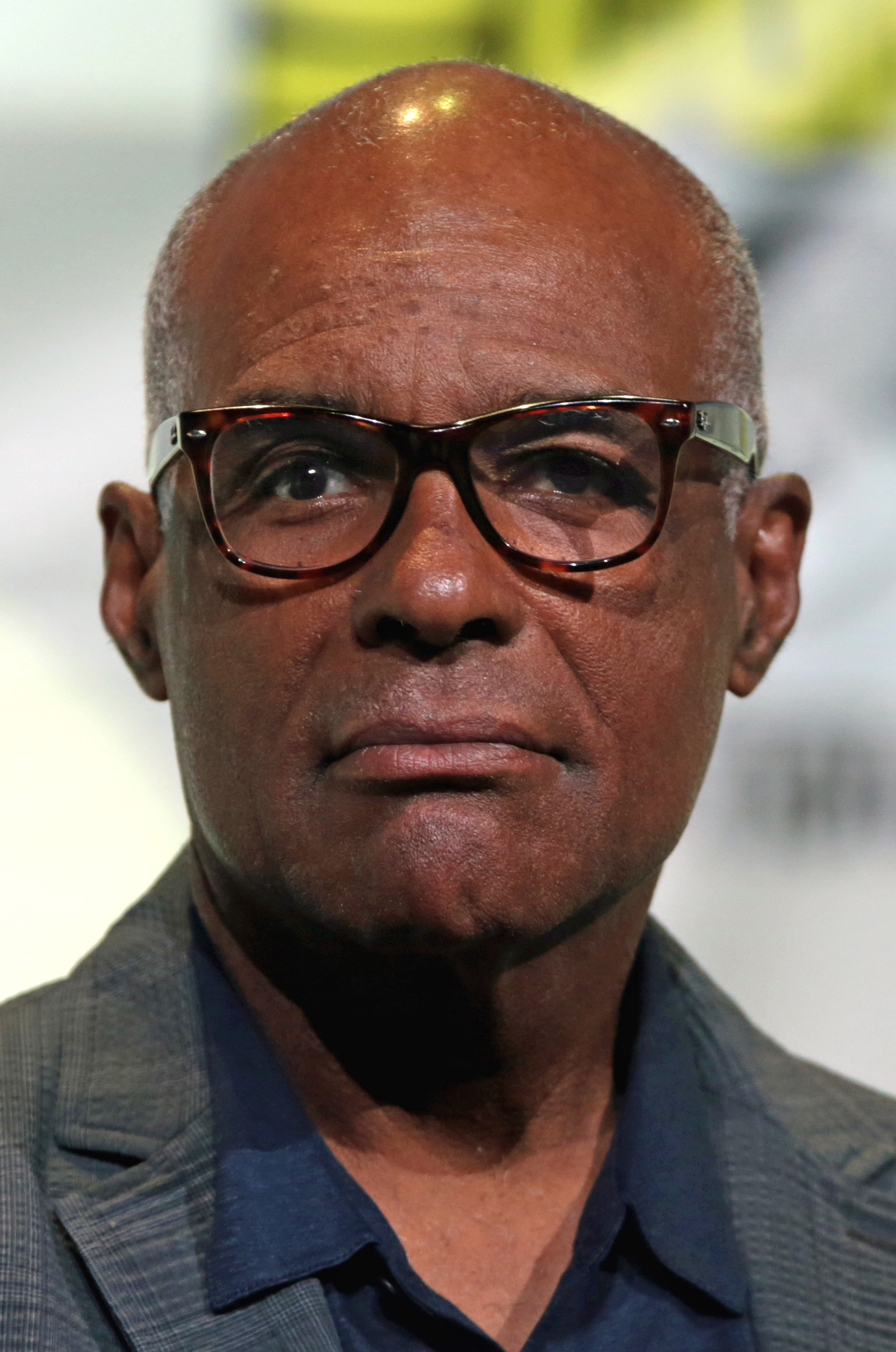
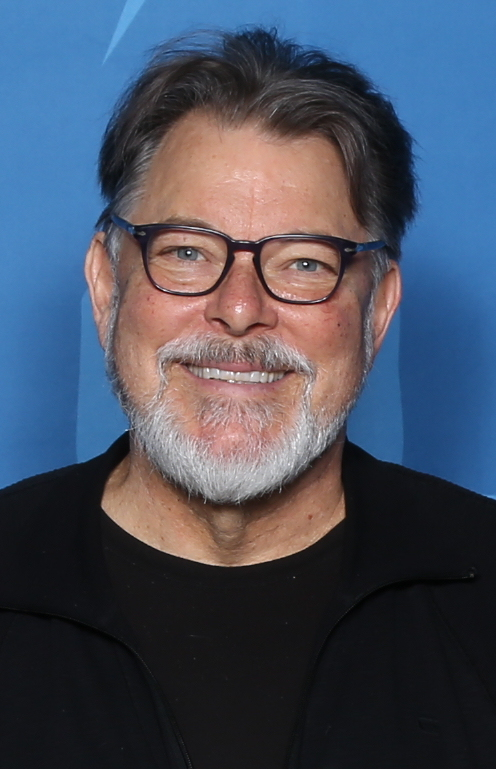
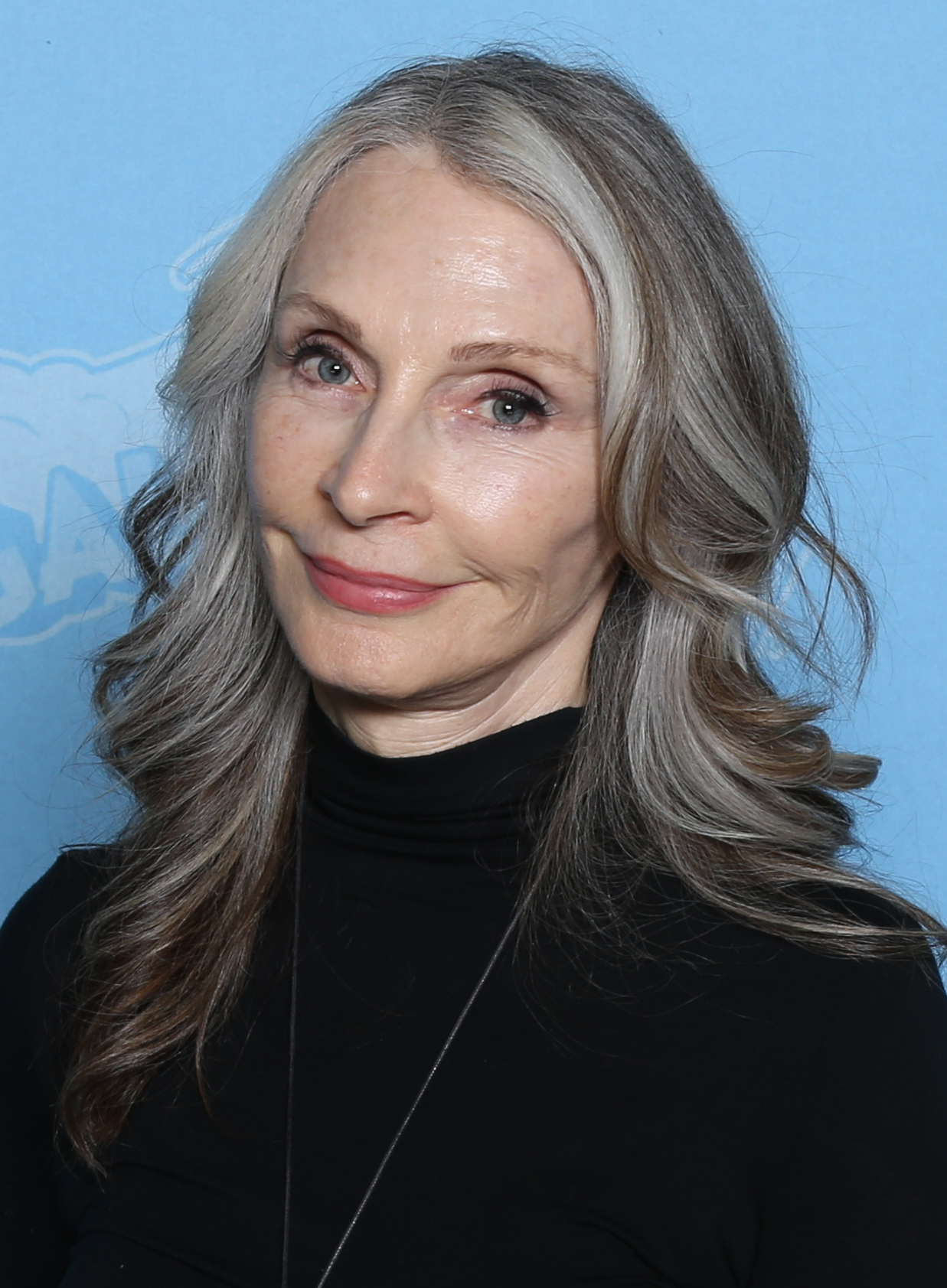
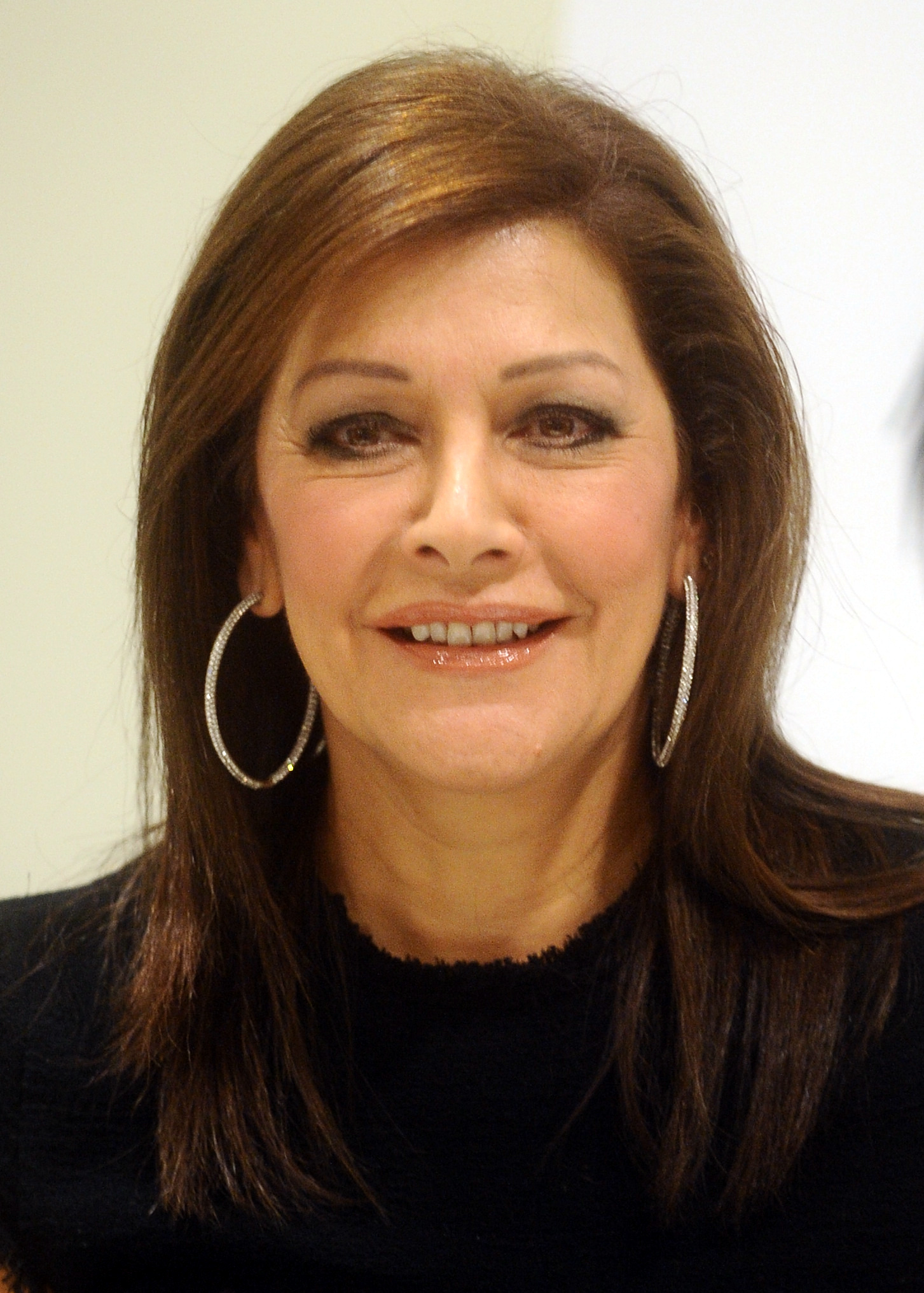
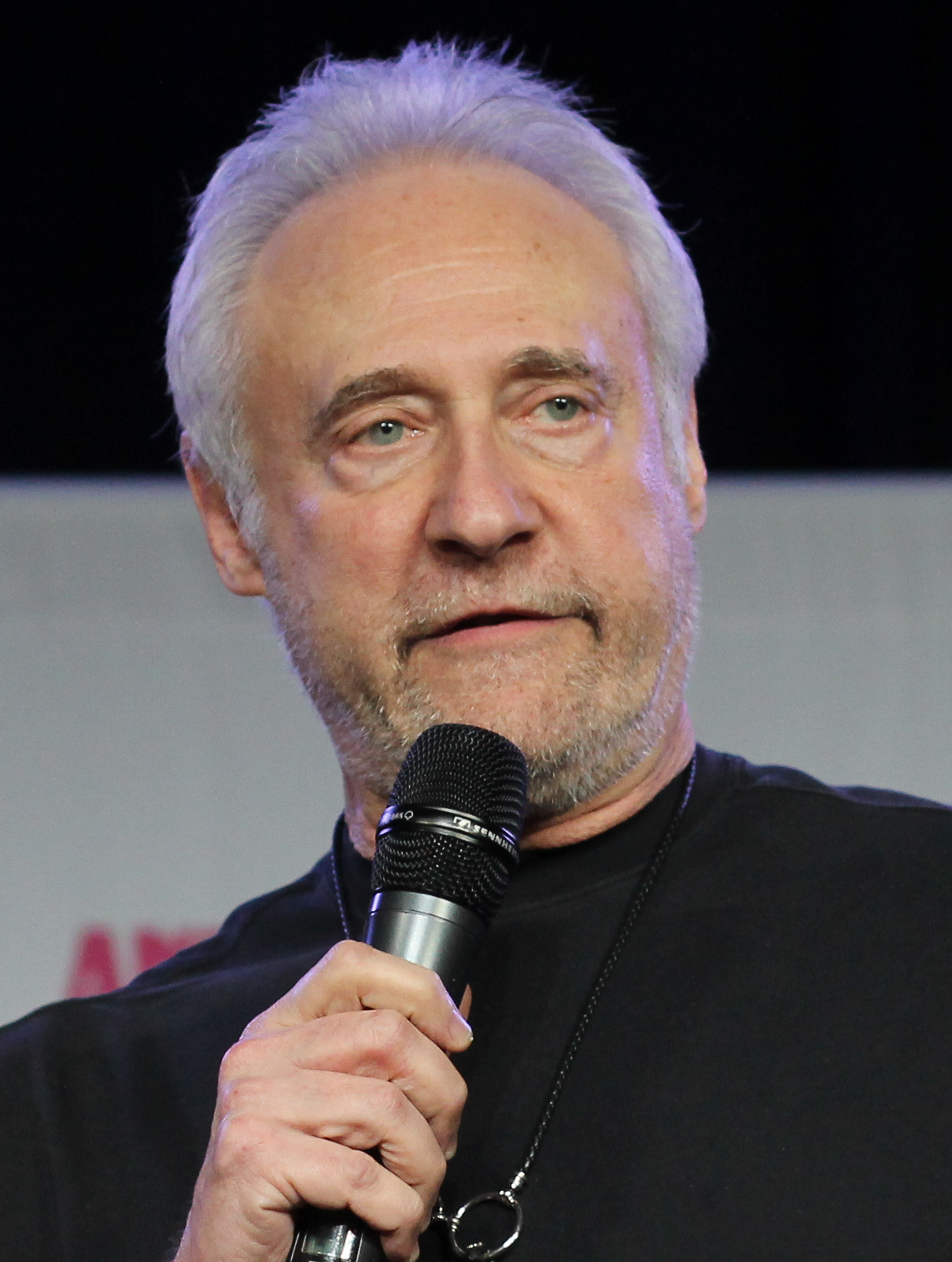
Main cast members from Star Trek: The Next Generation return to star in the season, including LeVar Burton, Michael Dorn, Jonathan Frakes, Gates McFadden, Marina Sirtis, and Brent Spiner

When originally developing the series, the creative team discussed not bringing back any other characters from The Next Generation to allow Picard to stand alone and not become reliant on nostalgia. Part of this was to allow newcomers who had not seen the previous series to enjoy Picard. However, the writers wanted to be respectful to longtime fans of Star Trek and felt they were missing opportunities by not including certain characters, so they decided to add some returning guests who organically served the new story. In January 2020, Stewart said it was his hope that all of the main cast of The Next Generation would appear on Picard before the end of the series.

In April 2022, members of the Next Generation cast were confirmed to be starring in the third season with Stewart: LeVar Burton as Geordi La Forge, Michael Dorn as Worf, Jonathan Frakes as William Riker, Gates McFadden as Beverly Crusher, Marina Sirtis as Deanna Troi, and Brent Spiner. Matalas confirmed that these would not be brief cameo appearances and said all of the cast would appear together in the season. After initially avoiding bringing back the full cast, executive producer Alex Kurtzman said they had a good story reason to reunite them in the third season and the producers felt that they had earned the right to do so after the first two seasons. McFadden said she loved the story that had been written for the cast in the season, while Sirtis said they had been "cherished" by the producers in contrast to their experience on Nemesis. Burton said he would be happy if he did not portray La Forge again after getting to "put a period at the end of this sentence and close the book" on the character with this season. After Spiner decided that he would not portray his Next Generation character Data again after the first season, Matalas said he would play a "new old character that you have seen and never seen before" that connects to the plot of the third season. This was revealed in October 2022 to be a version of the android Lore, Data's evil twin.

Wil Wheaton, who starred as Wesley Crusher in The Next Generation and made a cameo appearance in the second-season finale, was not included in the season. After the second-season finale was released in May 2022, series regulars Santiago Cabrera, Alison Pill, Evan Evagora, and Isa Briones revealed that they did not return for the third season. Jeri Ryan, Michelle Hurd, and Orla Brady did return as Seven of Nine, Raffi Musiker, and Laris, respectively. Matalas said budget and time limitations meant some "hard choices" had to be made about which characters to bring back for the season, especially with the need to sign on all of the returning Next Generation actors.

Matalas stated in late May that the season's villain was portrayed by a well-known actor who had not appeared in Star Trek before, and said they had given "one of the all-time great Star Trek villain performances". That June, Burton revealed that his daughter Mica had been cast as one of La Forge's daughters in the season. In August, Matalas said there would be more "legacy characters" appearing in the season beyond the main Next Generation cast. The writers considered including a grown-up version of the Star Trek: Voyager character Naomi Wildman for a specific sequence that was ultimately deemed too expensive to film. Also that month, Denise Crosby said her Next Generation character Tasha Yar would appear in the season, despite the actress previously stating that she was not involved in the series during filming. Matalas soon confirmed that the character would appear in the season as a reference to her Next Generation role. At New York Comic Con in October, Amanda Plummer was revealed to be portraying the season's villain, Vadic. Her father Christopher Plummer had previously played an unrelated Star Trek villain, General Chang in the film Star Trek VI: The Undiscovered Country (1991). Additionally, Daniel Davis was announced to be reprising his Next Generation role as a sentient hologram of Arthur Conan Doyle's literary character Professor Moriarty, Mica Burton's casting as La Forge's youngest daughter Alandra was confirmed, and Ashlei Sharpe Chestnut was revealed to be portraying La Forge's oldest daughter Sidney.

In January 2023, Ed Speleers was announced as playing a new series regular. This was revealed to be Jack Crusher, the son of Picard and Beverly Crusher. At the same time, Todd Stashwick was revealed to have a recurring role as the captain of the USS Titan, Liam Shaw. Stashwick previously starred in 12 Monkeys and also had a guest role in Star Trek: Enterprise. Other members of the Titan crew include Chestnut as helm officer Sidney La Forge, Stephanie Czajkowski as Vulcan science officer T'Veen, Joseph Lee as Bajoran tactical officer Matthew Arliss Mura, and Jin Maley as Haliian communications officer Kova Rin Esmar. Thomas Dekker, who portrayed Picard's imaginary son Thomas in the film Star Trek Generations (1994) and had a guest role in Voyager, appears as a Changeling posing as the criminal Titus Rikka.

=== Design ===
Matalas said each season of Picard would be differentiated visually, but he and production designer Dave Blass wanted the second and third seasons to return to the visual style of the Next Generation era. In April 2022, Blass announced that several crew members from Next Generation era Star Trek had returned to work on the design team for Picard: computer graphics engineer Ben Betts, visual effects producer Dan Curry, set designer Daren Dochterman, concept designer and visual effects artist Doug Drexler, starship designer John Eaves, graphic designer Monica Fedrick, graphic designer Alan Kobayashi, production designer Geoffrey Mandel, video engineer Larry Markart, computer playback supervisor Todd A. Marks, production illustrator Jim Martin, art director Karl J. Martin, and graphic designer Michael Okuda who designed the LCARS computer system for The Next Generation.

Kurtzman said Dorn's prosthetics for the Klingon character Worf would match his Next Generation appearance and not be changed to match the new Klingon designs from Star Trek: Discovery. Worf uses a new weapon in the season called a "kur'leth", which was designed by Curry who designed other Klingon weapons for The Next Generation such as the bat'leth.

The sets for the USS Stargazer from the second season were re-dressed to portray a different starship in the third, the USS Titan. The Titan previously appeared in the animated series Star Trek: Lower Decks as a Luna-class ship designed by Sean Tourangeau, but Matalas felt that design was specific to the Next Generation era and wanted to consider new designs that aligned with the Picard era's Stargazer design. He worked with Blass, Drexler, and Eaves to determine what the design could be based on potential fictional events that would impact Starfleet design decisions. They decided that some older design elements from before the Next Generation era could be brought back for the new period of scientific exploration, which led to them creating the USS Titan-A, a new version of the ship that was refit to feature Constitution-class design elements (based on the starships from the Original Series era) after the original was retired. The new ship is a Neo-Constitution- or Constitution III-class ship, and was based on Star Trek fan Bill Krause's designs for an Original Series-era Constitution-style ship called the Shangri-La-class. The season also reveals that before the Next Generation-era Luna-class Titan there was an earlier version of the ship that was Shangri-La-class. Matalas described the USS Titan-A as a "long-range workhorse of a ship. Harkening back to the Constitution-class that was designed for the long 5-year missions. It is an exploratory vessel with some serious maneuvering capabilities." He compared the use of an older-style ship to Tom Cruise's Pete "Maverick" Mitchell flying a P-51 Mustang fighter plane from the 1940s in Top Gun: Maverick (2022).

The season also introduces the SS Eleos, a former Starfleet science and medical ship that Beverly Crusher uses, as well as a new Spacedock based on the one that was first introduced in Star Trek III: The Search for Spock (1984). Matalas added that the USS Enterprise (NCC-1701-F) would have a role in the season. The last Enterprise to appear in the official timeline was the USS Enterprise-E in Nemesis; the Enterprise-F is an Odyssey-class starship that was designed by Adam Ihle for 25th-century stories in the Star Trek Online video game. Star Trek Online designer and associate art director Thomas Marrone built the digital model of the Enterprise-F, which he provided to Picard's visual effects team just as he did with other starship models for the previous season.

=== Filming ===
Filming for the second season began on February 16, 2021, with some third-season scenes being filmed at the same time. Production was taking place in California where the series received tax incentives to continue filming there after the first season. The second and third seasons had one of the largest television series crews at the time with more than 450 crewmembers. Due to the COVID-19 pandemic, strict guidelines were followed on set and cast and crew members were regularly tested. Principal photography for the second season ended on September 2, and the production then segued fully into filming the third.

As with the previous seasons, filming was divided into two-episode blocks. Picard's producing director Doug Aarniokoski directed the first block. Matalas wanted Joe Menendez, whom he worked with on 12 Monkeys, to return as a director from the second season of Picard but Menendez was unable to due to a scheduling conflict with his series Kung Fu. Frequent Star Trek director Frakes, who the producers initially wanted to focus on his acting rather than direct for the season, stepped in to direct the second block, and completed filming for his episodes by the end of December 2021. There was a break in filming for the Christmas holidays and production resumed on January 3, 2022, but more than 50 members of the production crew and main cast tested positive for COVID-19 on that day. Filming for the season was immediately shut down, but resumed on January 7. Dan Liu and Deborah Kampmeier directed the next two blocks of episodes, and Matalas directed the last block. He was filming the series finale by February 28. Production on the series wrapped on March 8.

=== Visual effects ===
The user interfaces for the starships were created by visual effects company Twisted Media, based on the LCARS computer system. They referenced the designs from The Next Generation and the films of that era, as well as the Star Trek: The Next Generation Technical Manual (1991) reference guide by Rick Sternbach and Michael Okuda. Okuda consulted on the company's LCARS designs, as did Drexler who also provided digital models that were integrated into the interface screens. For two episodes in the second season, Todd A. Marks and his video playback company Images on Screen used a combination of LG OLED screens and Screen Innovations' FlexGlass projection screens (paired with rear screen projectors) to display the user interfaces on set during filming. The success of the FlexGlass projection technology led to it being used much more in the third season.

=== Music ===
Stephen Barton, returning to work with Matalas from the series 12 Monkeys, replaced composer Jeff Russo from the first two seasons. Barton and Matalas began work on the season's score by April 2022, composing new themes together including the theme for the USS Titan-A. Frederik Wiedmann provided additional music for the season, which Matalas said was necessary due to the scope of the score for the later episodes.

Matalas said the music for the season was strongly influenced by the work of composers Jerry Goldsmith and James Horner for the Star Trek films. He added that themes from four different iterations of Star Trek would be used together in the score, which Barton described as a "6 1/2 hour love letter in music" to Goldsmith, Horner, and the Next Generation composers. At the end of July, Barton and Matalas were recording the score with an 80-person orchestra at the Eastwood Scoring Stage at Warner Bros. Studios in California. Craig Huxley contributed performances on the blaster beam, an instrument that he invented and previously played on the soundtrack of Star Trek: The Motion Picture (1979).

In January 2023, Matalas said they were discussing whether to release the soundtrack album before the season premiered or wait to avoid it spoiling the ending. He explained that they were being prevented from releasing the soundtrack in different volumes, as was done for other television series, due to union rules. The soundtrack was ultimately released digitally by Lakeshore Records on April 20, coinciding with the release of the season's final episode. A second volume was eventually released on August 16, 2024, featuring previously unreleased music from the season. All music by Stephen Barton and Frederik Wiedmann:

Star Trek: Picard, Season 3 (Original Series Soundtrack)
No.	Title	Length
1.	"Beverly Crusher"	3:02
2.	"Old Communicator"	1:59
3.	"Hello, Beautiful"	1:57
4.	"Leaving Spacedock"	3:45
5.	"I Like That Seven!"	3:29
6.	"Breaking the Beam"	3:59
7.	"The Shrike"	3:35
8.	"Picard's Answer"	4:09
9.	"Riker and Jack"	2:09
10.	"Call Me Number One"	2:02
11.	"No Win Scenario"	3:57
12.	"Blood in the Water"	2:58
13.	"Let's Go Home"	3:24
14.	"Flying Blind"	5:51
15.	"A New Family"	4:16
16.	"Klingons Never Disappoint"	5:32
17.	"I Do See You"	5:27
18.	"Legacies"	3:16
19.	"Evolution"	2:44
20.	"La Forges"	2:08
21.	"Invisible Rescue"	3:34
22.	"Catch Me First"	2:33
23.	"Proteus"	3:46
24.	"Dominion"	7:05
25.	"Lower the Partition"	3:39
26.	"Get Off My Bridge"	4:26
27.	"Family Reunion"	3:18
28.	"Impossible"	1:37
29.	"Frontier Day"	2:44
30.	"Hail the Fleet"	4:03
31.	"You Have the Conn"	3:44
32.	"Make It So"	6:02
33.	"This Ends Tonight"	3:08
34.	"Battle on the Bridge"	2:59
35.	"All That's Left"	2:02
36.	"Annihilate"	3:06
37.	"Trust Me"	2:06
38.	"The Last Generation"	2:51
39.	"Where It All Began"	2:19
40.	"The Missing Part of Me"	4:31
41.	"Must Come to an End"	1:33
42.	"A New Day"	3:22
43.	"Legacy and Future"	1:44
44.	"Names Mean Everything"	1:44
45.	"The Stars – End Credits"	3:00
Total length:		2:30:00

Star Trek: Picard, Season 3, Volume 2 (Original Series Soundtrack)
No.	Title	Length
1.	"Assimilated Delta"	0:24
2.	"Captain's Log"	2:41
3.	"Missing the Chase"	1:51
4.	"You Have to Go"	2:11
5.	"Old Fashioned Road Trip"	1:40
6.	"You Are a Warrior"	2:44
7.	"Son & Shrike Revealed"	2:56
8.	"Basically a Saint"	1:20
9.	"Legendary Admiral"	1:38
10.	"Captain No"	2:38
11.	"Worf Splinters In"	2:04
12.	"Titan on the Run"	2:31
13.	"Commander Seven"	0:55
14.	"Jack Crushes It"	1:11
15.	"The Relentless Shrike"	1:48
16.	"Seventeen Seconds"	1:16
17.	"Wolf 359"	4:24
18.	"What We Do Best"	3:17
19.	"The Only Family I Need"	1:16
20.	"Ro's Investigation"	2:19
21.	"Worf Reunion, No Hugging"	1:25
22.	"To Burgle Daystrom"	5:16
23.	"The Marvelous Moriarty"	3:30
24.	"An Enterprising Titan"	2:33
25.	"Ol' Yellow Eyes Is Back"	4:44
26.	"Imposter Voyager"	3:17
27.	"I Am Vadic"	2:32
28.	"Jackstral Projection"	3:21
29.	"Finally Reunited"	1:15
30.	"The Son of Locutus"	5:39
31.	"Her Majesty Returns"	2:34
32.	"Futile Resistance"	2:22
33.	"An Honor Serving with You"	3:57
34.	"Future's End"	3:06
35.	"Captain Seven"	1:21
36.	"Welcome to the Enterprise"	2:31
37.	"Star Trek Legacy"	1:04
38.	"End Credits"	1:48
Total length:		1:33:00

== Marketing ==
Unusually for a television showrunner, Matalas was able to collaborate with the Paramount+ marketing department and editor Drew Nichols on the trailers for the season so he would be happy about how much information was released early. A teaser was released on April 5, 2022, celebrating "First Contact Day" which marks the fictional holiday when first contact between humans and aliens was made in the Star Trek universe. The teaser included the announcement of the returning Next Generation cast members with voiceover from those actors and footage of Picard looking at an old uniform. Another teaser was released during the Star Trek Universe panel at San Diego Comic-Con in July 2022, giving a first look at the returning Next Generation cast members in costume. Character posters for Stewart, Ryan, Hurd, and the returning Next Generation actors were also released.

On September 8, Stewart, Ryan, and Hurd promoted the series at a "Star Trek Day" event where the season's premiere date was announced and a new teaser introducing the USS Titan was revealed. A month later, at New York Comic Con, the season was promoted during a Star Trek Universe panel with Stewart, Sirtis, McFadden, Dorn, Burton, Frakes, Spiner, and executive producers Matalas, Roddenberry, and Kurtzman. A new trailer was released at the panel, revealing Plummer's casting as the villain as well as the returns of Lore and Professor Moriarty. James Whitbrook at Gizmodo praised the trailer for teasing what will happen in the season beyond the nostalgic returns of the Next Generation cast that the previous teasers focused on. Whitbrook described the new trailer as "absolutely bananas", mostly because of the Lore and Moriarty reveals. At Den of Geek, John Saavedra said there was "plenty to point out" in the trailer and also highlighted those two characters. Samantha Coley at Collider said the trailer was "jam-packed with action, emotion, and new and returning characters".

A final trailer for the season was released on January 29, 2023, during the AFC Championship Game. It revealed the involvement of Speleers and Stashwick. The key art for the season was also released at that time. Ryan Britt of Inverse said the trailer "doubles-down" on the previous trailers' reveals. He felt the stakes were closer to a film than a normal season of Star Trek television, and said the end of the trailer, with the returning Next Generation characters all together, felt "momentous". Ben F. Silverio at /Film said the trailer "shines some light on the mission that brings this iconic group back together", and Whitbrook said the season looked "apocalyptic". On April 19, before the finale was released on Paramount+, the last two episodes were screened in IMAX theaters in Los Angeles, New York, Phoenix, San Francisco, Seattle, Orlando, Atlanta, Dallas, and Washington, D.C.

== Release ==
=== Streaming and broadcast ===
The season premiered on Paramount+ in the United States on February 16, 2023, and ran for 10 episodes until April 20. Matalas said in August 2022 that the season would be ready for release later that year and he tried to move the premiere to Christmas 2022, but Paramount+ wanted to release it in 2023. Each episode of Picard was broadcast in Canada by Bell Media on the same day as the Paramount+ release, on the specialty channels CTV Sci-Fi Channel (English) and Z (French) before streaming on Crave. Amazon Prime Video released each episode within 24 hours of its U.S. debut in over 200 other countries and territories around the world.

In February 2023, Paramount made a new deal with Prime Video for the series' international streaming rights. This allowed the season to be streamed on Paramount+ in some other countries, within 24 hours of each episode's U.S. debut, alongside its Prime Video release. The first two seasons were also added to Paramount+ internationally in addition to remaining on Prime Video. In August 2023, Star Trek content was removed from Crave and the season began streaming in Canada on Paramount+ instead. The series would continue to be broadcast on CTV Sci-Fi and would be available on CTV.ca and the CTV app.

=== Home media ===
The season was released on DVD, Blu-Ray, and Limited Edition Steelbook formats in the U.S. on September 5, 2023. The release includes all 10 episodes as well as more than two-and-a-half hours of special features, including deleted scenes, a gag reel, audio commentaries, a discussion panel with cast and crew, the raw footage of the final poker scene, and behind-the-scenes featurettes on the Next Generation cast, reconstructing the Enterprise-D set, and Vadic. Also released on September 5 was a box set featuring the complete series and over seven hours of special features. Both releases included an older version of a visual effects shot from the finale, featuring the Enterprise-D flying towards Earth, which had been updated on Paramount+ soon after the episode was released to use an "enhanced" version created for the finale's theatrical screenings. After fans and journalists pointed this out, Paramount said the updated version of the effects shot would be used for future home media releases instead. A 54-disc Blu-ray "Picard Legacy Collection" that includes this series was released on November 7.

== Reception ==
=== Viewership ===
Eric Deggans of NPR included the season on his list of most anticipated series of early 2023, and staff at Collider included it on their list of most anticipated series of the whole year.

The season was listed among the Nielson Top 10 Streaming Original Programs in the U.S. three times, the weeks of March 13–19, April 10–16, and April 17–23, 2023.

=== Critical response ===
Star Trek: Picard season 3: Critical reception by episode
Percentage of positive critics' reviews tracked by the website Rotten Tomatoes

The review aggregator website Rotten Tomatoes reported a 97% approval score with an average rating of 8.50/10 based on 103 reviews. The website's critical consensus reads, "Finally getting the band back together, Picard's final season boldly goes where the previous generation had gone before—and is all the better for it." Metacritic, which uses a weighted average, assigned a score of 83 out of 100 based on reviews from 16 critics, indicating "universal acclaim".

=== Accolades ===
Patrick Stewart and Gates McFadden were named TVLine's "Performers of the Week" for the week of February 26, 2023, for their performances in the episode "Seventeen Seconds". The site focused on the scene in which Picard confronts Crusher about their son, saying Stewart "did some of his best work ever as Jean-Luc in those moments, and McFadden matched him beat for emotional beat... plumbing depths that Trek shows rarely attempt to reach". The site also named Amanda Plummer and Michelle Forbes as honorable mentions for their performances in "Disengage" and "Imposters", respectively. They said Plummer was "deliciously evil as Vadic" and the first memorable villain of the modern Star Trek series, while Forbes was a "jaw-dropping blast from the past" who let the audience see "the decades of pain buried deep inside Ro" in her scenes with Stewart.

In June 2023, Alan Sepinwall at Rolling Stone named the season as one of the best series of the year so far. Brady Langmann and Adrienne Westenfeld of Esquire did the same a month later. At the end of the year, the series was named on best television series lists for 2023 by The Salt Lake Tribune (1st), Den of Geek (10th), and Total Film (19th), as well as by Collider and TheWrap on unranked lists.

Year	Award	Category	Nominee(s)	Result	Ref.
2023	Astra TV Awards	Best Streaming Drama Series	Star Trek: Picard	Nominated	
2023	Astra TV Awards	Best Actor in a Streaming Drama Series	Patrick Stewart	Nominated	
2023	Astra TV Awards	Best Supporting Actor in a Streaming Drama Series	Brent Spiner	Nominated	
2023	Astra TV Awards	Best Supporting Actress in a Streaming Drama Series	Jeri Ryan	Won	
2023	Astra TV Awards	Best Writing in a Streaming Drama Series	Terry Matalas (for "The Last Generation")	Won	
2023	Astra TV Awards	Best Directing in a Streaming Drama Series	Terry Matalas (for "The Last Generation")	Nominated	
2023	Astra TV Awards	Best Guest Actress in a Drama Series	Michelle Forbes	Nominated	
2023	Hollywood Professional Association Awards	Outstanding Sound — Episode or Non-Theatrical Feature	Matthew E. Taylor, Michael Schapiro, Todd Grace, Ed Carr III, and Ian Shedd (for "The Last Generation")	Nominated	
2023	Primetime Creative Arts Emmy Awards	Outstanding Contemporary Makeup (Non-Prosthetic)	Silvina Knight, Tanya Cookingham, Allyson Carey, Peter De Oliveira, Hanny Eisen, and Kim Ayers (for "Võx")	Nominated	
2023	Primetime Creative Arts Emmy Awards	Outstanding Prosthetic Makeup	James Mackinnon, Hugo Villasenor, Bianca Appice, Kevin Wasner, Afton Storton, Kevin Haney, Neville Page, and Vincent Van Dyke (for "The Last Generation")	Nominated	
2024	Critics' Choice Super Awards	Best Science Fiction/Fantasy Series, Limited Series or Made-For-TV Movie	Star Trek: Picard	Nominated	
2024	Critics' Choice Super Awards	Best Actor in a Science Fiction/Fantasy Series, Limited Series or Made-For-TV Movie	Todd Stashwick	Nominated	
2024	Critics' Choice Super Awards	Best Actor in a Science Fiction/Fantasy Series, Limited Series or Made-For-TV Movie	Patrick Stewart	Nominated	
2024	Critics' Choice Super Awards	Best Actress in a Science Fiction/Fantasy Series, Limited Series or Made-For-TV Movie	Jeri Ryan	Nominated	
2024	Critics' Choice Super Awards	Best Villain in a Series, Limited Series or Made-For-TV Movie	Amanda Plummer	Nominated	
2024	Golden Reel Awards	Outstanding Achievement in Sound Editing – Broadcast Long Form Effects and Foley	Matthew E. Taylor, Michael Schapiro, Harry Cohen, Alex Pugh, Deron Street, John Sanacore, Clay Weber, and Rick Owens (for "The Last Generation")	Nominated	
2024	ICG Publicists Awards	Maxwell Weinberg Award for Television Publicity Campaign	Star Trek: Picard	Nominated	
2024	ICG Publicists Awards	Television Showperson of the Year	Patrick Stewart	Won	
2024	International Film Music Critics Association Awards	Composition of the Year	"Leaving Spacedock" (music by Stephen Barton and Frederik Wiedmann)	Nominated	
2024	International Film Music Critics Association Awards	Best Original Score for Television	Star Trek: Picard (music by Stephen Barton and Frederik Wiedmann)	Nominated	
2024	Make-Up Artists and Hair Stylists Guild Awards	Best Special Make-Up Effects in a Television Series, Limited or Miniseries or New Media Series	James MacKinnon, Hugo Villasenor, Bianca Appice, and Vincent Van Dyke	Nominated	
2024	Saturn Awards	Best Science Fiction Television Series	Star Trek: Picard	Won	
2024	Saturn Awards	Best Actor in a Television Series	Patrick Stewart	Won	
2024	Saturn Awards	Best Supporting Actor in a Television Series	Jonathan Frakes	Won	
2024	Saturn Awards	Best Supporting Actor in a Television Series	Ed Speleers	Nominated	
2024	Saturn Awards	Best Supporting Actor in a Television Series	Todd Stashwick	Nominated	
2024	Saturn Awards	Best Supporting Actress in a Television Series	Jeri Ryan	Won	
2024	Saturn Awards	Best Guest Star in a Television Series	Amanda Plummer	Nominated	
2024	Writers Guild of America Awards	Episodic Drama	Terry Matalas (for "The Last Generation")	Nominated	
