= Natalie Chaidez =

American television writer and producer

Natalie Chaidez is an American television writer and producer, known for Terminator: The Sarah Connor Chronicles, Hunters, and 12 Monkeys.

She's currently the showrunner for Queen of the South. More recently, Chaidez signed a multi-year overall deal with Warner Bros. Television.

== Personal life ==
Born and raised in Los Angeles, Chaidez is a graduate of UCLA School of Theater, Film and Television. Her daughter, Chloe, is the lead singer of the indie rock band Kitten. She is of Mexican and Irish ancestry.

== Filmography ==
Writer

- Cracker

Producer

- Queen of the South (executive producer)
- Hunters (executive producer)
- 12 Monkeys (executive producer)
- Terminator: The Sarah Connor Chronicles (co-executive producer and consulting producer)
- Heroes (co-executive producer)
- Skin (co-executive producer)
- Trinity (producer)
