= Terry Matalas =

American screenwriter

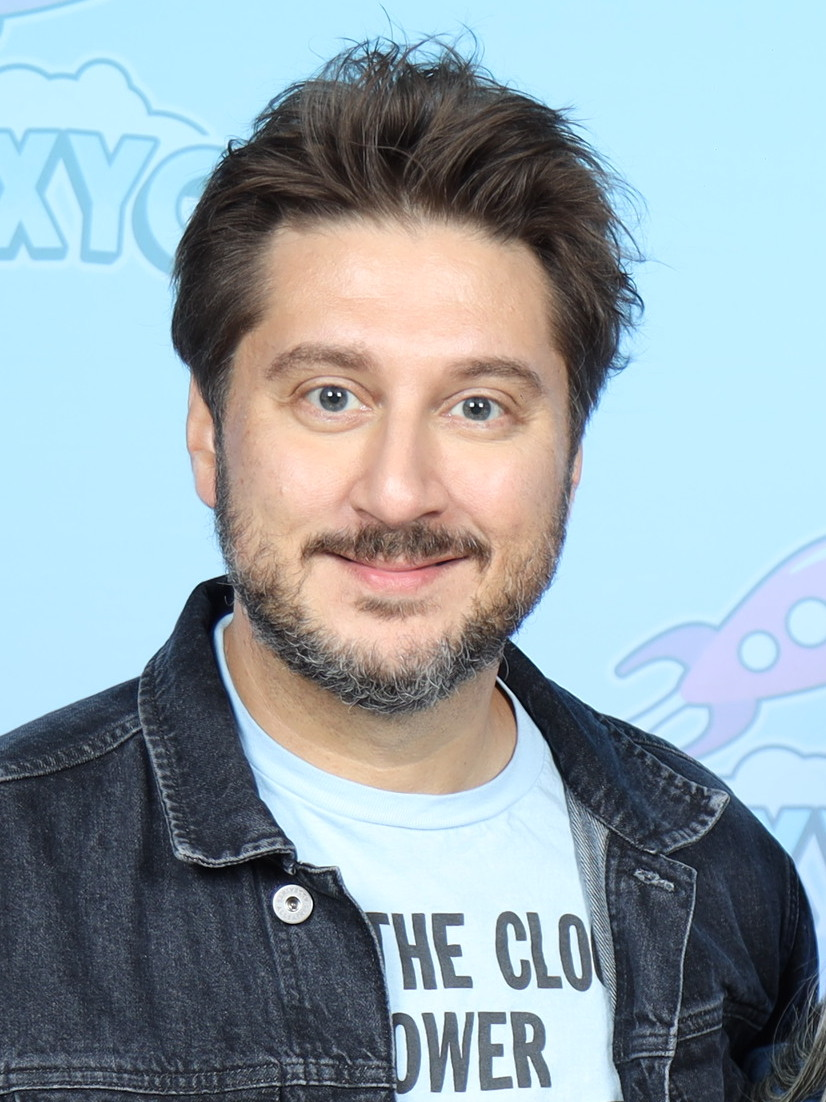
- Matalas at GalaxyCon Austin in 2023
- Born: December 11, 1975 (age 50); New Jersey, U.S.
- Education: Emerson College
- Occupations: Television writer, producer, showrunner, director
- Years active: 2001–present
- Notable work: 12 Monkeys; MacGyver; Star Trek: Picard

Terry Matalas (born December 11, 1975) is an American television writer, director, and executive producer, best known for co-creating and showrunning 12 Monkeys (2015–18), which ran for four seasons on SyFy. He was a showrunner on the fourth season of MacGyver for CBS (2020) and the second and third seasons of Star Trek: Picard on Paramount+ (2022–23).

== Early life ==
Matalas grew up near Raritan, New Jersey. As a teenager, Matalas' favorite movie was Back to the Future, and Star Trek: The Next Generation was one of his favorite shows. He ended up working on projects related to both titles later in his professional career.

Matalas attended Emerson College in Boston, where he met frequent co-collaborator Travis Fickett.

== Career ==
=== Career beginnings: 2001–2012 ===
Matalas began his career working as a production assistant on Star Trek: The Next Generation, he was hired prior to him graduating college by an associate producer of TNG, Merri Howard, whom he credits for his show business start and the as the reason he made it in Los Angeles. He claims he owes his career to her. He continued as an associate on the TV series Star Trek: Voyager and Star Trek: Enterprise, including writing two stories for the latter. He also wrote for Terra Nova on Fox and Nikita on The CW.

In 2011, Matalas and Fickett wrote the graphic novel Witch for Kickstart Comics. In 2012, Matalas wrote the Star Trek: The Next Generation comic miniseries Hive for IDW Publishing.

=== 12 Monkeys ===
Matalas says he always wanted to create a serialized time travel show. In 2013, he and Fickett co-wrote a spec pilot script called Splinter. Their script received positive responses and ended up at the offices of Atlas Entertainment, the production company that produced the 1995 film 12 Monkeys. The company told Matalas and Fickett that they had been planning to reboot the film as a show, and they wanted the pair to rewrite Splinter as a pilot for 12 Monkeys. Rather than completely rewriting their script, Matalas suggested simply changing the characters' names to those from 12 Monkeys. Atlas agreed, and SyFy ordered the series. The show ran for four seasons.

During its run, 12 Monkeys earned both critical acclaim and a dedicated viewer base. The show has been praised for its consistent logic regarding time travel, to which Matalas said that his rule in the writers' room was, "If you have to draw a timeline on a dry erase board then we can't use it." Both the cast and the crew, including Matalas, embraced the show's fandom by interacting via social media to answer questions and give shoutouts to individuals.

Matalas often wrote easter eggs into the series. In the second season, the Emerson Hotel is named after his alma mater, and has a clock that is always set to 10:04 in reference to Back to the Future. Matalas also cast Christopher Lloyd in the third season of 12 Monkeys, which he called a "dream come true".

=== Other work ===
In 2018, Matalas sold an original drama series to CBS entitled Apex. The same year, he was hired as a consultant producer on SyFy's Nightflyers, an adaptation of George R.R. Martin's novella of the same name.

In 2019, Matalas was brought on to the reboot of MacGyver for CBS, as a showrunner on the fourth season.

Matalas' drama series The Last American Vampire was announced for defunct streaming service Quibi. Matalas had originally sold the project to NBC as an adaptation of the novel Abraham Lincoln, Vampire Hunter. There is no update since the shuttering of Quibi.

In 2022, Matalas was promoted to co-showrunner of Star Trek: Picard for the second season and served as sole showrunner for the third and final season.

In 2024, Matalas was hired by Marvel Studios to serve as showrunner for the Marvel Cinematic Universe TV series VisionQuest, set for release in 2026.

== Personal life ==
While making 12 Monkeys, Matalas became a parent. During that time, he also lost his father.

Matalas participated in the restoration of Universal Studios' original "A" DeLorean time machine, used in the Back to the Future trilogy. Working with Joe Walser and other enthusiasts, and with support from the films' co-writer Bob Gale, he helped develop a proposal and budget for the project. The team used original design sketches and production photographs to guide the restoration, catalogued the car's components, and recovered or replaced missing parts. The restored car was unveiled at Universal Studios Hollywood on March 5, 2013. It went on public display at the Petersen Automotive Museum in April 2016.

Matalas also owns a replica incorporating parts from the film trilogy's "B" car, which has appeared at the Academy Awards and in Super Bowl commercials. In 2018, the same replica was featured on Jay Leno's Garage, with Matalas appearing alongside Walser and Gale.

== Filmography ==
Year	Title	Director	Writer	Producer	Creator	Showrunner	Notes	Ref.
2003	Star Trek: Enterprise	No	Yes	No	No	No	Season 3	
2011	Terra Nova	No	Yes	No	No	No	Season 1	
2012–13	Nikita	No	Yes	Yes	No	No	Seasons 3–4	
2015–18	12 Monkeys	Yes	Yes	Executive	Yes	Yes	Seasons 1–4	
2017	Blood Drive	No	No	Consulting	No	No	Season 1	
2018	Nightflyers	No	Yes	Consulting	No	No	Season 1	
2020	MacGyver	No	No	Executive	No	Yes	Season 4	
2022–23	Star Trek: Picard	Yes	Yes	Executive	No	Yes	Season 2–3	
2026	VisionQuest	Yes	Yes	Executive	Yes	Yes		

Actor

Year	Title	Role	Note
2024	Impractical Jokers	Man in Q's Wheel of Doom challenge goal	Episode "Bowling for Dollars"

== Notable awards and nominations ==
Year	Award	Category	Nominated work	Result	Ref
2023	Astra TV Awards	Best Directing in a Streaming Series, Drama	Star Trek: Picard ("The Last Generation")	Nominated	
2023	Astra TV Awards	Best Writing in a Streaming Series, Drama	Star Trek: Picard ("The Last Generation")	Won	
2024	Writers Guild of America Awards	Television: Episodic Drama	Star Trek: Picard ("The Last Generation")	Nominated	
