= 12 Monkeys (TV series) =

2015-18 American television series

- Genre: Action-adventure; Drama; Science fiction; Mystery thriller
- Based on: La Jetée by Chris Marker; 12 Monkeys by; David Peoples; Janet Peoples
- Developed by: Terry Matalas; Travis Fickett
- Showrunners: Natalie Chaidez (season 1); Terry Matalas (seasons 2–4); Travis Fickett (season 2)
- Starring: Aaron Stanford; Amanda Schull; Kirk Acevedo; Noah Bean; Todd Stashwick; Emily Hampshire; Barbara Sukowa
- Composers: Trevor Rabin; Paul Linford; Bryce Jacobs; Stephen Barton
- Country of origin: United States
- Original language: English
- No. of seasons: 4
- No. of episodes: 47 (list of episodes)

Production
- Executive producers: Richard Suckle; Charles Roven; Natalie Chaidez (season 1); Jeffrey Reiner (pilot); David Grossman (season 2–4); Travis Fickett (season 2); Terry Matalas (season 2–4)
- Producers: Jake Kurily (seasons 1–2); Rebecca Kirsch (season 1); Richard E. Robbins (season 2); Tony Elliott (season 3–4); Sean Tretta (season 3–4)
- Production locations: Toronto, Canada; Detroit, Michigan, US (pilot); Republic of Macedonia (season 1); Dominican Republic (season 1); Budapest, Hungary (season 2); Prague, Czech Republic (season 3–4)
- Cinematography: Todd McMullen (pilot); David Greene; Tico Poulakakis; Boris Mojsovski
- Camera setup: Single-camera
- Running time: 41–49 minutes
- Production companies: Division Street (season 3–4); Atlas Entertainment; Universal Cable Productions

Original release
- Network: Syfy
- Release: January 16, 2015 – July 6, 2018

12 Monkeys is an American science fiction television series on Syfy developed by Terry Matalas and Travis Fickett loosely adapting the 1995 film 12 Monkeys, itself based on Chris Marker's 1962 featurette La Jetée.

In the series, Aaron Stanford and Amanda Schull star as James Cole and Dr. Cassandra "Cassie" Railly, two strangers brought together by destiny on a mission to use time travel to stop the destructive plans of the enigmatic organization "Army of the 12 Monkeys". Kirk Acevedo and Noah Bean also star in the first season. In the second season, Bean makes a guest appearance, and Todd Stashwick, Emily Hampshire, and Barbara Sukowa are promoted from recurring guests to regulars. In the fourth season, Acevedo moves from starring to recurring guest star. Stanford, Schull, and Hampshire play reimagined versions of characters respectively portrayed by Bruce Willis, Madeleine Stowe, and Brad Pitt in the 1995 film. Stowe made a guest appearance in the second season in a small but pivotal role.

Natalie Chaidez was the showrunner of 12 Monkeys during its first season, working closely with creators Matalas and Fickett. For the second season, she stepped down from the role of consultant and Matalas and Fickett became showrunners. In the third and fourth seasons Fickett became a consultant, and Matalas was the sole showrunner. The series was produced by Atlas Entertainment, which also made the 1995 film, and Universal Cable Productions. Charles Roven, producer of the original film, was one of the series executive producers.

12 Monkeys premiered on January 16, 2015, with a 13-episode first season which received mixed critical reception, and ended with the completion of its 11-episode fourth season on July 6, 2018, for a total of 47 episodes produced. From its second season and onward, it enjoyed more consistently favorable critical reception. The series won two awards for its cinematography, one by each of the American and Canadian Societies of Cinematographers, and was nominated for a further four.

== Plot ==
In the year 2043, scavenger James Cole (Aaron Stanford) has been recruited by a team of "Project Splinter" scientists led by physicist Katarina Jones (Barbara Sukowa), to travel back in time to the year 2015 and stop the release of a deadly virus by the enigmatic organization known as the "Army of the 12 Monkeys". In Cole's original timeline, the virus caused a plague (Kalavirus) that resulted in the death of seven billion humans in the year 2017, and its mutations will mean the eventual end of the human race. In the 2015 timeline, Cole will meet and enlist the help of brilliant virologist Dr. Cassandra "Cassie" Railly (Amanda Schull); the two are brought together because a recording mentioning Cole, that Cassie made after the viral outbreak, is uncovered by Katarina Jones in the future timeline, prompting her to select Cole for the mission. Cole will also encounter a seemingly unstable math genius named Jennifer Goines (Emily Hampshire), whose father Cole has been ordered to kill, Cassie's ex-boyfriend Aaron Marker (Noah Bean) and the dangerous high-ranking members of the Army of the 12 Monkeys, "Pallid Man" (Tom Noonan) and Olivia (Alisen Down). In the future timeline, Cole will also have to deal with his best friend José Ramse (Kirk Acevedo), and a man named Theodore Deacon (Todd Stashwick), who leads a brutal pack of scavengers from which Cole and Ramse fled. Cole and Cassie will try to unveil the identity and whereabouts of the mysterious leader of the Army of the 12 Monkeys, who is only known as "the Witness" and who is always one step ahead of them.

Season	Episodes	Originally released	
Season	Episodes	First released	Last released
1	13	January 16, 2015	April 10, 2015
2	13	April 18, 2016	July 18, 2016
3	10	May 19, 2017	May 21, 2017
4	11	June 15, 2018	July 6, 2018

== Cast and characters ==
=== Main ===
- Aaron Stanford as James Cole, a scavenger who travels back in time to stop the plague and redeem himself from his troubled past
- Amanda Schull as Cassandra "Cassie" Railly, a virologist who leaves a message about the origins of the plague that scientists recover in the future
- Kirk Acevedo as José Ramse (seasons 1–3; recurring season 4), Cole's best friend
- Noah Bean as Aaron Marker (season 1; guest season 2), Cassie's ex-boyfriend and political insider
- Todd Stashwick as Theodore Deacon (seasons 2–4; recurring season 1), leader of a brutal group of survivors called the West VII
- Emily Hampshire as Jennifer Goines (seasons 2–4; recurring season 1), daughter of Leland Goines and a math genius, who meets Cole in a psych ward
- Barbara Sukowa as Katarina Jones (née Werner) (seasons 2–4; recurring season 1), the inventor and operator of the time machine

=== Recurring ===
- Tom Noonan as the man commonly referred as "Tall Man" by the characters, and "Pallid Man" by the writers, who is the villainous face of the Army of the 12 Monkeys
- Romina D'Ugo as Max (season 1; co-star season 4), a scavenger from the West VII group, and former lover of Cole
- Demore Barnes as Marcus Whitley, one of the few remaining soldiers of the U.S. military.
- Ramon De Ocampo as Oliver Peters (seasons 1–2), Markridge Group's medical researcher
- Alisen Down as Olivia Kirschner, also known as "Striking Woman" outside the show, a high-ranking member of the Army of the 12 Monkeys
- Amy Sloan as Elena (season 1), mother of Ramse's son
- Andrew Gillies as Julian Adler (seasons 2–4; co-star season 1), a Project Splinter scientist
- Michael Hogan as David Eckland (season 2), a charismatic and intelligent scientist from the future who had been Jones' partner in another reality.
- Scottie Thompson as the unnamed woman referred to by the writers as "Mantis" (season 2–4) a calculating and menacing time traveler, and mother of the Tall Man and Olivia
- Jay Karnes as Robert Gale (season 2–4), a savvy 1940s FBI agent who believes a series of grisly murders may have something to do with Cole, whom he suspects might not be from this time
- Brooke Williams as Hannah Jones, also known as "Zeit" (seasons 2–4), Katarina and Elliot Jones' biological daughter, whose death was Jones' personal motivation to invent time travel.
- Murray Furrow as Dr. Lasky (seasons 3–4; co-star seasons 1–2), a Project Splinter scientist
- Hannah Waddingham as Magdalena (season 3), a member of the Army of the 12 Monkeys charged with protecting the Witness and who has been dubbed "both ruthless and expedient" in her methods
- Faran Tahir as Mallick (season 3–4), an imposing and devout enforcer of the Army of the 12 Monkeys who resides in Titan
- James Callis as Athan Cole (season 3; co-star season 4), Cole and Railly's son, who has been raised by the Army of the 12 Monkeys to become their leader, "the Witness"
- Julian Richings as an advisor to Olivia (season 4)
- Abigail Hardingham as Emma (season 4), also known as Marion Woods, Olivia's daughter

== Production ==
=== Conception ===
Terry Matalas and Travis Fickett, who had written together for the series Nikita and Terra Nova, wrote an original spec script television pilot with a time travelling plot, named Splinter. Eventually, the script found its way to Atlas Entertainment's offices, who had produced the 12 Monkeys movie and had been wanting to create a TV series based on it for some time. After some deliberation, Matalas and Fickett came to an agreement with Atlas Entertainment to transform Splinter into a 12 Monkeys adaptation. According to Matalas, most of the Splinter pilot was changed, aside from the overall structure of the plot being an attempt to stop a man from doing something in the past, the concept of the same watch from different points in time, the terminology used for traveling through time ("splintering"), and the female lead character named "Cassie".

=== Development ===
"Ultimately, our version of predestination – and where it diverges from La Jetée or the original film – is that it's a basically a bullfight, a ballet, against Time. That Time is something to be wrestled with and fought against – and after you've bled and been beaten and gotten your ass thoroughly kicked, maybe you've moved it an inch.

The idea of a closed loop works beautifully in a film, but for the story and the emotion of a TV series to really resonate, the characters and the audience have to believe that change is possible. It's hard-fought and not without causalities along the way, but we've already seen that time can be affected. Whether it can be changed enough – or how Time might account for those changes – are some of the central questions of the show. It's also possible that all of this is a closed loop with several loops inside that loop."

— Terry Matalas, co-creator, on how the time travel model of the series differs from that of its source material.

On July 22, 2013, The Hollywood Reporter first revealed that Syfy was developing a 12 Monkeys television adaptation, in the form of a 90-minute backdoor pilot that would lead to a straight-to-series order, similarly to what the Battlestar Galactica miniseries did. The pitch for the pilot, which would be written by Matalas and Fickett, was submitted to Syfy by Atlas Entertainment's Charles Roven and Richard Suckle; Roven was one of the producers of the original film. Jon Cassar was reported as being on board to direct. The following month, it was reported that Syfy decided to green-light an hour-long pilot, which would be executive produced by Roven and Suckle, with production set to begin in November. Due to the series being labeled as "cast contingent", production could not move forward until the roles of Cole and Goines were cast. On April 4, 2014, Syfy green-lit the first season, consisting of 13 episodes, including the pilot filmed in 2013. The pilot was directed and executive produced by Jeffrey Reiner; Matalas and Ficket, who wrote it, were announced to co-executive produce the season, while Natalie Chaidez would serve as showrunner. Chaidez credited her experience writing for the first season of Heroes and the two seasons of Terminator: The Sarah Connor Chronicles, two science fiction series with time traveling plots, as valuable to understanding how to make 12 Monkeys work. Matalas presented the series as a "complete reimagining" of the film and not just a remake, citing Looper as an inspiration for the time travel visual effects. In fact, as Matalas explained, the story of the film was adapted into the first act of the pilot, and from there on, the series follows an original storyline, although it continues to homage both the film and La Jetée. Madeleine Stowe, who played the equivalent of Amanda Schull's character in the film, narrated the opening of the season 2 premiere and made an appearance in its finale. Two major differences compared to the movie are that this version of time travel allows for changes in the past to affect the future, and that the "Army of the 12 Monkeys" is a real organization rather than a red herring.

The series creators plotted three seasons in advance, although they noted that the show could go on for longer than that. During the second season they said they need four seasons to tell the complete story. The ending of the series has been known to them since the beginning. Matalas said about it: "We have a definitive target in place. It's very emotional and it's going to make everyone cry." Chaidez said the ending is designed to "circle back".

The series premiered on January 16, 2015, and was renewed for a second season on March 12, 2015, which premiered on April 18, 2016. Matalas and Fickett stepped in to replace Chaidez as showrunners during the second season.

The third season was announced on June 29, 2016, and premiered on May 19, 2017, with the first episode being the directorial debut for Matalas. Fickett left his position as executive producer and was credited as consultant, leaving Matalas the sole showrunner for the season. Nevertheless, Fickett provided the story and helped write the screenplay for the season's fourth episode, "Brothers". In a change over how the previous seasons were released, Syfy aired the entire third season over three consecutive nights. A fourth and final season was announced on March 16, 2017. It consisted of 11 episodes, which premiered on June 15, 2018, and concluded on July 6, 2018.

=== Filming locations ===
The pilot for 12 Monkeys was filmed in Detroit. Starting with the second episode, the bulk of principal photography for the series took place in Toronto, both on location and at the Cinespace Film Studios, where they constructed sets like the room with the time machine.

Additional filming for the first season took place in the Republic of North Macedonia, standing in for Chechnya, and the Dominican Republic, masquerading as Haiti. During the second season, production filmed for roughly 10 days in Budapest. Filming in Prague took place for about three weeks for the third season. The reason for moving to Europe was to benefit from the different flair and to use the older architecture for 1950s stand-ins. Production returned to Prague for the fourth season. Standing sets used in the series were changed constantly to reflect both older and newer versions of the locales and also alterations to the locations that resulted from the characters' trips through time.

=== Cinematography ===
Todd McMullen served as director of photography for the pilot, but once the series was ordered to series, David Greene replaced him. After shooting the first five episodes, Greene asked the producers if it would be possible to bring in an additional cinematographer so that they could alternate. Tico Poulakakis was brought in and filmed three episodes for the first season. In the second season, Greene and Poulakakis were joined by Boris Mojsovski, who became Greene's main alternate until the end of the series. To get more shooting days out of the production's schedule, two camera units shot in parallel resulting in episodes featuring work done by both Greene and Mojsovski. Mojsovski said about his close collaboration with Greene: "David and I were constantly working in unison. I'd prelight his sets and he'd prelight mine; I'd shoot one-third of his episode, and he'd shoot one-third of mine. We got so good at that, today we don't know who shot what!"

Stylistically, for the scenes set in the bleak future timeline, the production team decided to use a palette of constant blue and green tones, as well as smoke and atmosphere, to differentiate it from the ones set in the present timeline. The present timeline often used a wider range of colors. Greene decided to ignore the visual style of the original film, as he felt the series told a different story than it had. Instead, Greene's biggest stylistic influence while establishing the show's look in the first season was the film Children of Men, which he referenced for the look of the future timeline.

Filming for the show was done digitally in 1080p. For the first season, the cinematographers used the Arri Alexa Classic EV camera. Beginning with the second season, they transitioned to using the Alexa Mini. Lenses used for the first two seasons were Cooke 5/i and S4, and Leica Summilux-C later. Green mentioned using Panavision Primo lenses as well. In the third season, the MoVi camera stabilizer was used, and for a scene where Cole encounters his future self, the motion control Technodolly.

The American Society of Cinematographers has recognized the artistry and craftsmanship behind the show's cinematography by awarding it once and nominating it another two times, in categories relating to "Outstanding Achievement in Cinematography". The Canadian Society of Cinematographers similarly recognized it with one award and one nomination in the category of "TV Series Cinematography".

=== Visual effects ===
For the first season of 12 Monkeys, visual effects for the series were provided by Stargate Studios. Typical effects work included the "splintering" time travel effect, matte paintings of the decayed future timeline, and enhancing the stage sets. Starting with the second season, Folks VFX took over. According to Sebastien Bergeron, founder and VFX supervisor at Folks VFX, an episode of 12 Monkeys has 60–75 effects shots on average, but any given episode could have as low as 30 or as high as 100–125 shots. Bergeron said the bulk of their work was creating "unseen environments", but other instances of their output included "environment work, big futuristic cities, a time-traveling city, twinning of characters when they meet themselves in the past, destruction, explosions, all sorts of FX and particles – pretty much everything. There are also situations when we freeze the time, and then one character walks in the shot."

=== Music ===
Trevor Rabin and his longtime assistant Paul Linford composed the series' music for its first two seasons. Varèse Sarabande released the composers' score for the first season, consisting of 23 tracks, digitally and on CD, on July 31, 2015. Rabin called it "a hybrid score of ethnic sounds, orchestra, and electronic, with a strong theme base". The original film's theme music – an arrangement of Astor Piazzolla's Suite Punta del Este made by Paul Buckmaster – can be heard during the ninth episode of the second season, "Hyena".

Rabin and Linford did not return for the remaining seasons of the show. Instead, the music for the first few episodes of the third season was composed by Bryce Jacobs. Stephen Barton composed additional music for those episodes and took over as composer for the remaining episodes of the season, and the next. Barton's score for season 3 was released by Varèse Sarabande on December 15, 2017, on CD – and later digitally – and consists of 27 tracks.

The fourth season's score was released digitally on June 15, 2018, by Lakeshore Records. It consists of 31 tracks by Barton.

== Release ==
=== Broadcast ===
Syfy UK acquired regional broadcasting rights and 12 Monkeys premiered in the UK on February 27, 2015. The second season premiered April 27, 2016, and the third season May 26, 2017. Syfy UK chose not to acquire the fourth and final season of the show.

=== Home media ===
Universal Pictures Home Entertainment released the first season of the series on DVD and Blu-ray on January 19, 2016, and the second season on January 17, 2017. extras on the discs of the first two of seasons include webisodes, deleted scenes, and gag reels. Universal released the third and fourth seasons of the show on Blu-ray on August 14, 2018. In contrast to the earlier seasons, the discs are manufactured on demand, lack subtitles, and the only extras included are season trailers and deleted scenes. In Australia, Via Vision Entertainment released on DVD and Blu-ray the third season on May 23, 2018 and the fourth on January 2, 2019. Both Australian sets lack subtitles, while the third season's set also lacks any extras.

A set that collects all four seasons of the show was released on DVD and Blu-ray by Mill Creek Entertainment on July 14, 2020. In Australia, Via Vision released a limited edition on Blu-ray on August 19, 2020, that collects the four seasons, the original film, a bonus disc, and a foldout map of "The Word of the Witness", an item that features prominently in the story.

All four seasons are available for digital purchase on Amazon Prime Video and iTunes.

Syfy and Hulu announced that Hulu would exclusively make the first season available for streaming on February 24, 2016. Hulu added the second season on April 18, 2017, the third on May 16, 2017, and the fourth season on June 15, 2019. Hulu's exclusivity agreement only covers the US; outside its borders, Netflix has made the first three seasons of the show available in multiple regions.

== Reception ==
=== Critical response ===
Critical reaction to the first season of 12 Monkeys was mixed. Rotten Tomatoes, a review aggregator website, reported a 60% critical approval rating with an average rating of 6/10 based on 42 reviews. The website's critical consensus reads, "The nonsensical time travel in 12 Monkeys makes it less watchable than its original source material, but the high quality execution and cool characters are top-notch." On Metacritic, which uses a weighted average, the season was assigned a score of 57 out of 100, based on 25 critics, indicating "mixed or average reviews". Christine Seghers rated the first season 8.8/10 and wrote in her review for IGN: "What started as a simple 'let's go back and fix this' story soon blossomed into a deep philosophical mediation on the concept of predestination versus free will. If you wanted it. The show is also an awful lot of fun." The critical reception of the later episodes of the first season was more positive than the initial reception. The final episode of the season, "Arms of Mine", received rave reviews, including a 9.4/10 rating from IGN and a 4.5/5 rating from Den of Geek. The twelfth episode of the season, "Paradox", also received rave reviews, including a 9.3/10 rating from IGN and an A− rating from The A.V. Club.

The second season was received positively. Rotten Tomatoes indexed 12 reviews and reported a 92% critical approval rating with an average rating of 8.1/10. The assigned critical consensus reads: "Full of addictive twists, the second season of 12 Monkeys overcomes time traveling logic issues with help of added thriller elements." Seghers, rating the season 9.0/10, wrote for IGN: "In its outstanding sophomore season, 12 Monkeys became bigger, bolder and more beautifully baffling, reaffirming its status as one of the best sci-fi shows on television today." The episodes "Lullaby" and "Memory of Tomorrow" are generally considered to be the best episodes of the second season. "Lullaby" has a 9.4/10 rating from IGN and a perfect 5/5 rating from Den of Geek. "Memory of Tomorrow" has a 9.6/10 rating from IGN and a 4.5/5 rating from Den of Geek.

For the third season of 12 Monkeys, Rotten Tomatoes indexed ten positive reviews, leading to a 100% critical approval rating with an average rating of 9.1/10. The following critical consensus is assigned to the season: "12 Monkeys' third season satiates fans' hunger for fresh thrills, startling twists, and titillating time travel."

Rotten Tomatoes indexed 12 positive reviews for the fourth season, producing a 100% critical approval rating with an average rating of 9.3/10. The critical consensus of the website reads: "12 Monkeys continues to raise the bar with each marvelously complex episode in a knock-out fourth season that proves as unpredictable as it is gratifying."

=== Creative response ===
Before the 12 Monkeys series premiere, Terry Gilliam, director of the original film, expressed his reservations about the concept: "It doesn't have anything to do with me and no-one has contacted me. It's a very dumb idea. ... If it was going to be any good it would have to be written by David and Janet Peoples, who wrote the film, otherwise it would just be another version of Time Bandits." In another interview, Gilliam sounded apprehensive regarding whether Chris Marker – the author of La Jetée, the featurette that inspired Gilliam's film – would approve of the series: "I think that they've got just another time travel series. Of course, Chris Marker is dead, so he doesn't have to see it, what La Jetée spawned." However, according to Matalas, both the Peoples and Marker read the pilot and gave the series creators their blessing and support to move forward with it. The Peoples and Marker are credited in the opening and closing credits of each episode for their respective original works. Madeleine Stowe, lead actress of the original film, became supportive of the filmmakers after watching the pilot, appreciating the differences between her character and Amanda Schull's interpretation. She was later cast in a pivotal role in the second season.

== Accolades ==
Year	Award	Category	Nominee	Result	Ref.
2015	American Society of Cinematographers Awards	Outstanding Achievement in Cinematography in Episode of a Regular Series	David Greene (for "Mentally Divergent")	Nominated	
2015	Golden Maple Awards	Newcomer of the Year in a TV Series Broadcast in the U.S.	Emily Hampshire	Won	
2015	Saturn Awards	Best Syndicated/Cable Television Series	12 Monkeys	Nominated	
2016	Canadian Society of Cinematographers Awards	TV Series Cinematography	David Greene (for "Divine Move")	Won	
2016	Golden Maple Awards	Best Actress in a TV Series Broadcast in the U.S.	Emily Hampshire	Nominated	
2017	Canadian Society of Cinematographers Awards	TV Series Cinematography	Boris Mojsovski (for "Fatherland")	Nominated	
2018	American Society of Cinematographers Awards	Outstanding Achievement in Cinematography in Regular Series for Commercial Television	Boris Mojsovski (for "Thief")	Won	
2018	American Society of Cinematographers Awards	Outstanding Achievement in Cinematography in Regular Series for Commercial Television	David Greene (for "Mother")	Nominated	
